= Marsa =

Marsa may refer to:

== Places ==
- Marsa, Aude, a commune in the Aude department of France
- Marsa, Malta, a city in central Malta
- Mârșa, a commune in Giurgiu County, Romania
- La Marsa, a suburb of the city of Tunis, Tunisia
- Mârșa, a village in Avrig town, Sibiu County, Romania
- Marsa Alam, a town in the Red Sea coast of Egypt
- Marsa Matruh or Mersa Matrouh, capital of the Matruh Governorate in Egypt

== Other uses ==
- MARSA (aviation), a set of procedures for aircraft separation
- Marsa (football), a nickname for Croatian football club Marsonia
- Marsa F.C., a Maltese football club
- Mârșa River, a tributary of the Olt in Romania
- AS Marsa (volleyball), a Tunisian volleyball league

== See also ==
- El Marsa (disambiguation)
- Marsas (disambiguation)
