= Chelle-Spou =

- Commune
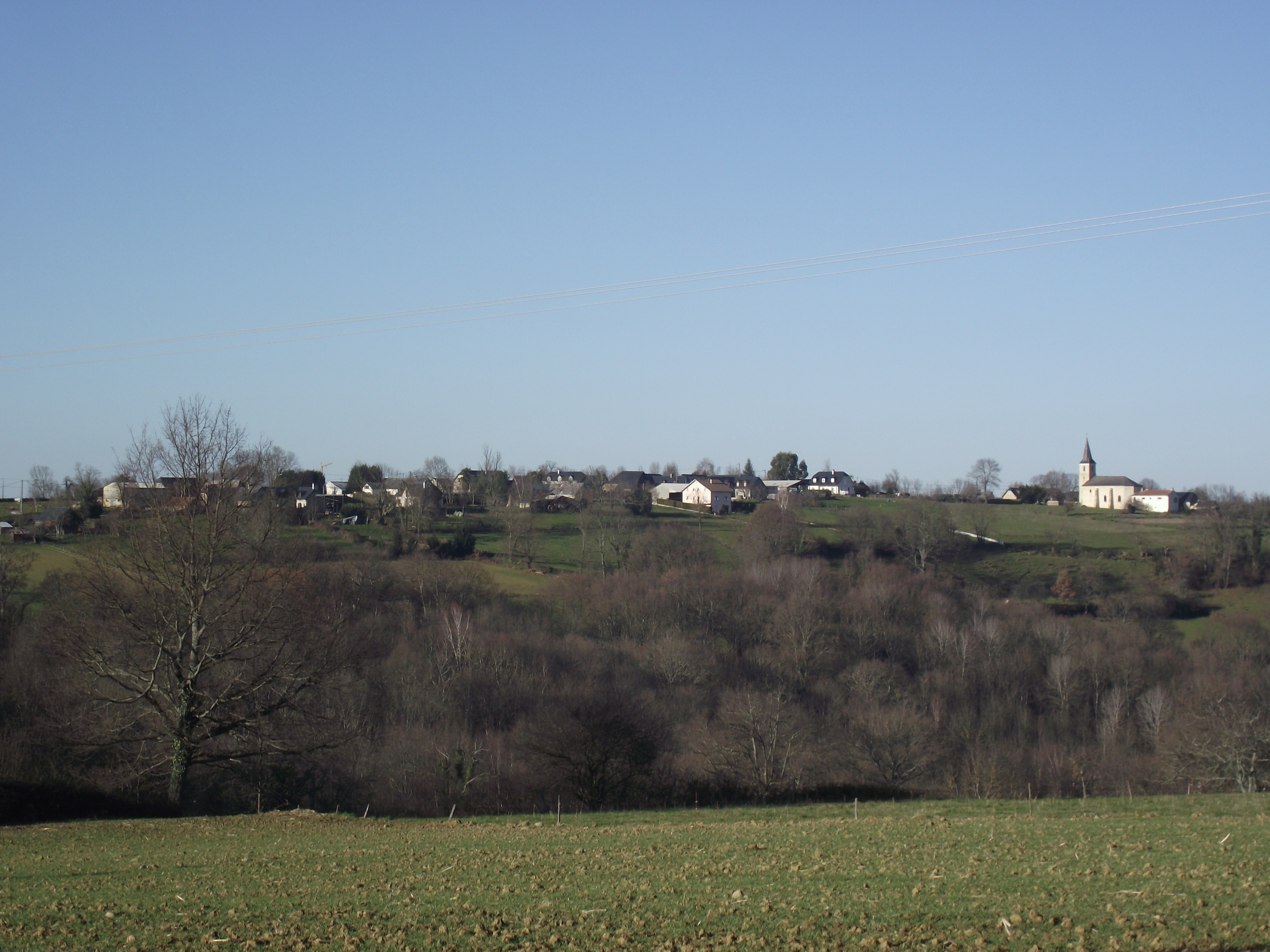
- The village seen from Artiguemy

- Coat of arms
- Location of Chelle-Spou
- Location within France Location within Occitanie
- Coordinates: 43°08′15″N 0°14′35″E
- Country: France
- Region: Occitania
- Department: Hautes-Pyrénées
- Arrondissement: Bagnères-de-Bigorre
- Canton: La Vallée de l'Arros et des Baïses
- Intercommunality: Plateau de Lannemezan

Government
  - Mayor (2020–2026): Noël Abadie
- Area^{1}: 4.58 km^{2} (1.77 sq mi)
- Elevation: 380 m (1,250 ft)
- Highest elevation: 491 m (1,611 ft)
- Lowest elevation: 279 m (915 ft)
- Population (2023): 106
  - Density: 23.1/km^{2} (59.9/sq mi)
- Time zone: UTC+01:00 (CET)
  - Summer (DST): UTC+02:00 (CEST)
- INSEE/Postal code: 65143 /65130
- ^{1} French Land Register data, which excludes lakes, ponds, glaciers > 1 km^{2} (0.386 sq mi or 247 acres) and river estuaries.

Chelle-Spou (French pronunciation: [ʃɛl spu]; Occitan: Shèla e Espon) is a commune in the Hautes-Pyrénées department in south-western France.

== See also ==
- Communes of the Hautes-Pyrénées department
