= Bagnères =

Bagnères is part of the name of three towns in France, all in the Pyrenees:

- Argelès-Bagnères, Hautes-Pyrénées Department
- Bagnères-de-Bigorre, Hautes-Pyrénées Department
- Bagnères-de-Luchon, Haute-Garonne Department
