= Asques =

Asques is the name of the following communes in France:

- Asques, Gironde, in the Gironde department
- Asques, Tarn-et-Garonne, in the Tarn-et-Garonne department

== See also ==
- Asque
