= Caharet =

- Commune
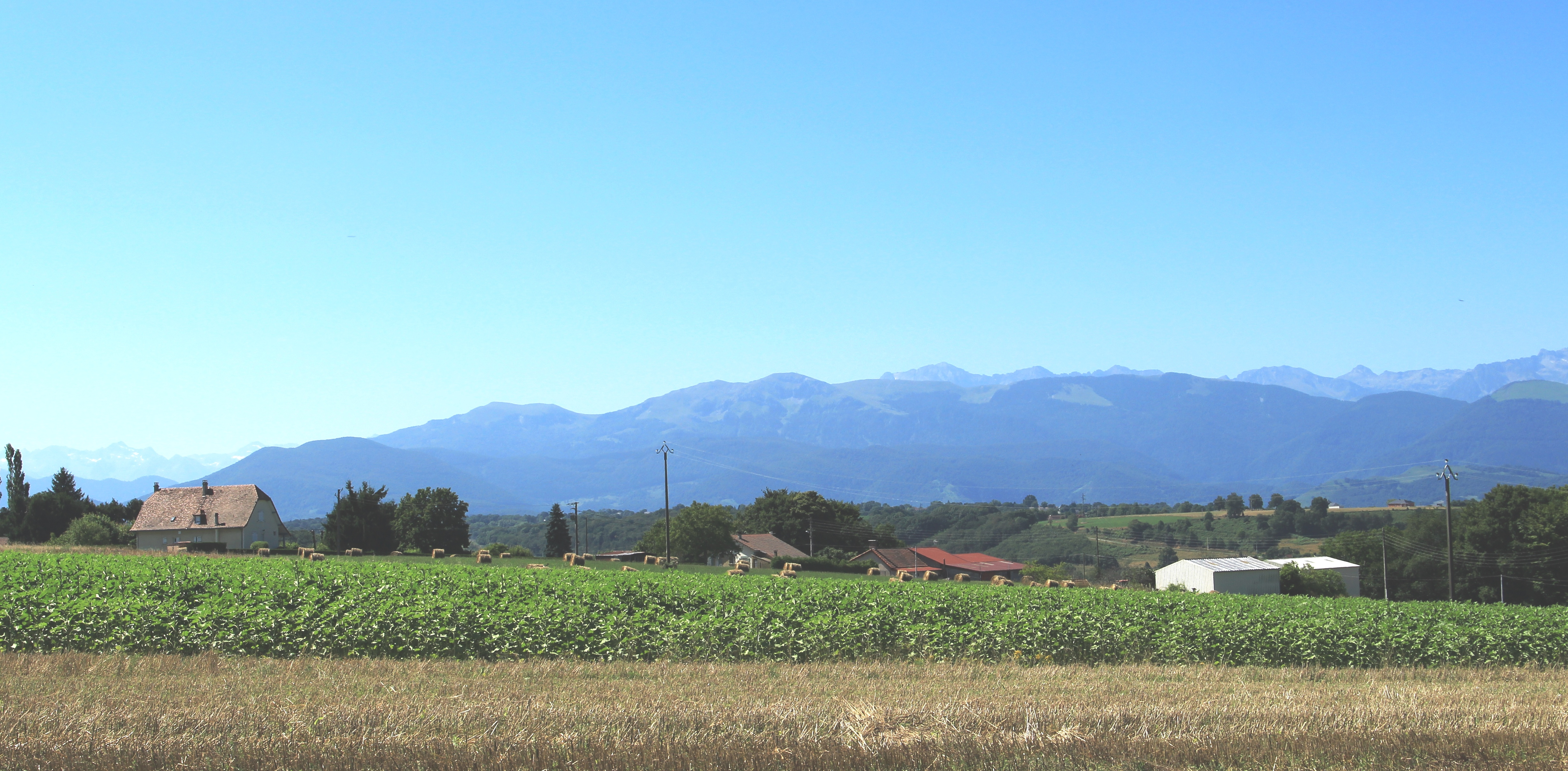
- View of Caharet
- Location of Caharet
- Location within France Location within Occitanie
- Coordinates: 43°08′44″N 0°19′06″E
- Country: France
- Region: Occitania
- Department: Hautes-Pyrénées
- Arrondissement: Tarbes
- Canton: La Vallée de l'Arros et des Baïses
- Intercommunality: Coteaux du Val d'Arros
- Area^{1}: 1.23 km^{2} (0.47 sq mi)
- Elevation: 600 m (2,000 ft)
- Highest elevation: 569 m (1,867 ft)
- Lowest elevation: 408 m (1,339 ft)
- Population (2023): 30
  - Density: 24/km^{2} (63/sq mi)
- Time zone: UTC+01:00 (CET)
  - Summer (DST): UTC+02:00 (CEST)
- INSEE/Postal code: 65118 /65190
- ^{1} French Land Register data, which excludes lakes, ponds, glaciers > 1 km^{2} (0.386 sq mi or 247 acres) and river estuaries.

Caharet is a commune in the Hautes-Pyrénées department in south-western France.

== See also ==
- Communes of the Hautes-Pyrénées department
