= Orieux =

- Commune
- Coat of arms
- Location of Orieux
- Location within France Location within Occitanie
- Coordinates: 43°14′00″N 0°17′34″E
- Country: France
- Region: Occitania
- Department: Hautes-Pyrénées
- Arrondissement: Tarbes
- Canton: La Vallée de l'Arros et des Baïses
- Intercommunality: Coteaux du Val d'Arros

Government
  - Mayor (2020–2026): Sylvie Mouledous
- Area^{1}: 8.19 km^{2} (3.16 sq mi)
- Elevation: 450 m (1,480 ft)
- Highest elevation: 473 m (1,552 ft)
- Lowest elevation: 290 m (950 ft)
- Population (2023): 110
  - Density: 13/km^{2} (35/sq mi)
- Time zone: UTC+01:00 (CET)
  - Summer (DST): UTC+02:00 (CEST)
- INSEE/Postal code: 65337 /65190
- ^{1} French Land Register data, which excludes lakes, ponds, glaciers > 1 km^{2} (0.386 sq mi or 247 acres) and river estuaries.

Orieux (French pronunciation: [ɔʁjø]; Occitan: Aurius) is a commune in the Hautes-Pyrénées department in south-western France.

== See also ==
- Communes of the Hautes-Pyrénées department
