= Uzer, Hautes-Pyrénées =

Uzer
- Commune
- Coat of arms
- Location of Uzer
- Location within France Location within Occitanie
- Coordinates: 43°04′43″N 0°11′47″E
- Country: France
- Region: Occitania
- Department: Hautes-Pyrénées
- Arrondissement: Bagnères-de-Bigorre
- Canton: La Vallée de l'Arros et des Baïses
- Intercommunality: CC de la Haute-Bigorre

Government
  - Mayor (2020–2026): Chantal Alban-Colomes
- Area^{1}: 3.48 km^{2} (1.34 sq mi)
- Elevation: 550 m (1,800 ft)
- Highest elevation: 722 m (2,369 ft)
- Lowest elevation: 437 m (1,434 ft)
- Population (2023): 103
  - Density: 29.6/km^{2} (76.7/sq mi)
- Time zone: UTC+01:00 (CET)
  - Summer (DST): UTC+02:00 (CEST)
- INSEE/Postal code: 65459 /65200
- ^{1} French Land Register data, which excludes lakes, ponds, glaciers > 1 km^{2} (0.386 sq mi or 247 acres) and river estuaries.

Uzer (French pronunciation: [yzɛʁ]; Occitan: Usèr) is a commune in the Hautes-Pyrénées department in south-western France.

== See also ==
- Communes of the Hautes-Pyrénées department
