= Bulan, Hautes-Pyrénées =

Bulan
- Commune
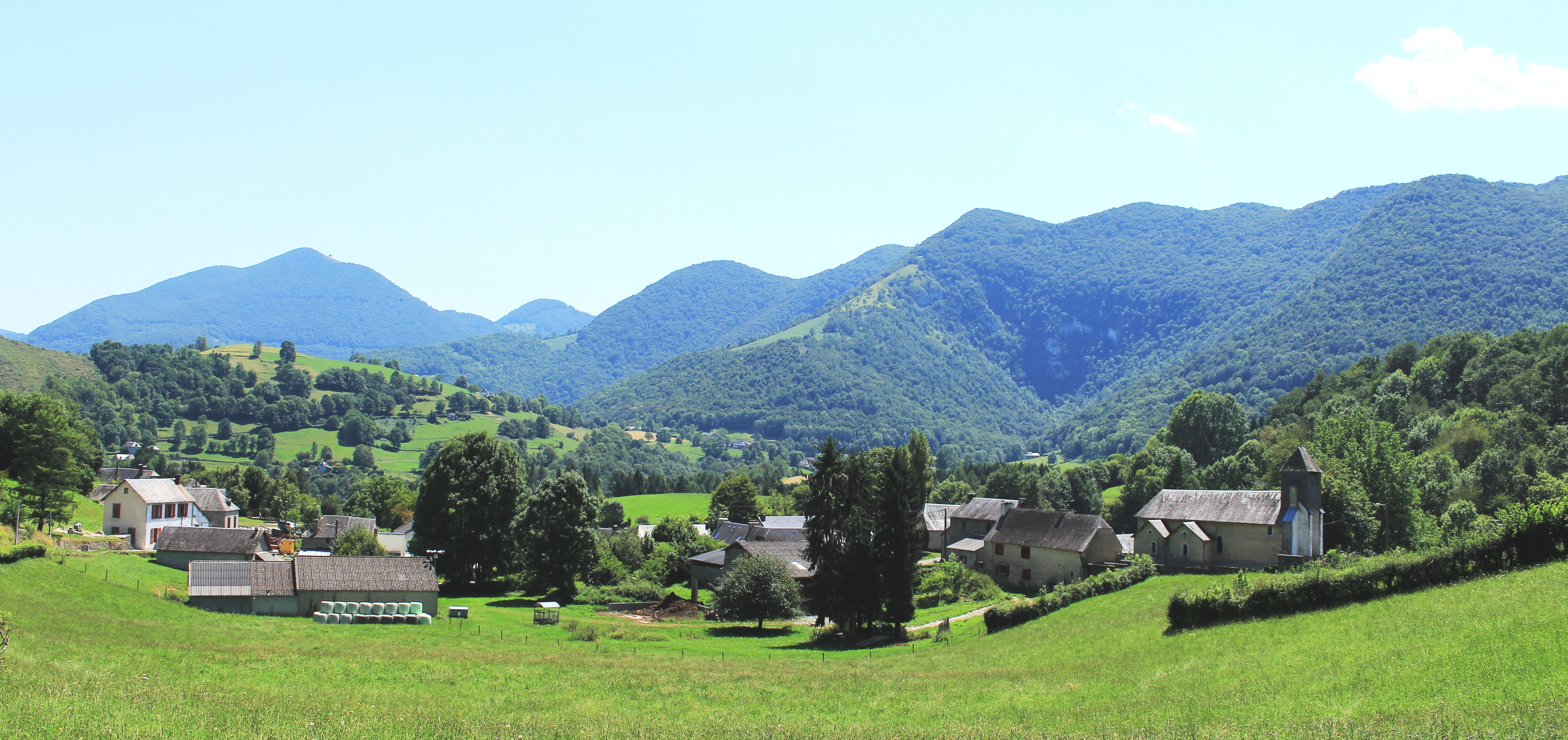
- View of Bulan

- Coat of arms
- Location of Bulan
- Location within France Location within Occitanie
- Coordinates: 43°02′25″N 0°16′45″E
- Country: France
- Region: Occitania
- Department: Hautes-Pyrénées
- Arrondissement: Bagnères-de-Bigorre
- Canton: La Vallée de l'Arros et des Baïses

Government
  - Mayor (2020–2026): Rose-Marie Colomes
- Area^{1}: 3.41 km^{2} (1.32 sq mi)
- Elevation: 500 m (1,600 ft)
- Highest elevation: 826 m (2,710 ft)
- Lowest elevation: 392 m (1,286 ft)
- Population (2023): 58
  - Density: 17/km^{2} (44/sq mi)
- Time zone: UTC+01:00 (CET)
  - Summer (DST): UTC+02:00 (CEST)
- INSEE/Postal code: 65111 /65130
- ^{1} French Land Register data, which excludes lakes, ponds, glaciers > 1 km^{2} (0.386 sq mi or 247 acres) and river estuaries.

Bulan (French pronunciation: [bylɑ̃]) is a commune in the Hautes-Pyrénées department in southwestern France.

== Population ==
Historical population
Year	Pop.	±% p.a.
1968	135	—
1975	110	−2.88%
1982	111	+0.13%
1990	93	−2.19%
1999	81	−1.52%
2007	68	−2.16%
2012	61	−2.15%
2017	61	+0.00%
2023	58	−0.84%
Source: INSEE

== See also ==
- Communes of the Hautes-Pyrénées department
