= Gourgue, Hautes-Pyrénées =

Gourgue
- Commune
- Coat of arms
- Location of Gourgue
- Location within France Location within Occitanie
- Coordinates: 43°08′12″N 0°15′52″E
- Country: France
- Region: Occitania
- Department: Hautes-Pyrénées
- Arrondissement: Bagnères-de-Bigorre
- Canton: La Vallée de l'Arros et des Baïses
- Intercommunality: Plateau de Lannemezan

Government
  - Mayor (2021–2026): Nicolas Colomes
- Area^{1}: 1.53 km^{2} (0.59 sq mi)
- Elevation: 334 m (1,096 ft)
- Highest elevation: 521 m (1,709 ft)
- Lowest elevation: 287 m (942 ft)
- Population (2023): 58
  - Density: 38/km^{2} (98/sq mi)
- Time zone: UTC+01:00 (CET)
  - Summer (DST): UTC+02:00 (CEST)
- INSEE/Postal code: 65207 /65130
- ^{1} French Land Register data, which excludes lakes, ponds, glaciers > 1 km^{2} (0.386 sq mi or 247 acres) and river estuaries.

Gourgue (French pronunciation: [ɡuʁɡ]; Occitan: Gorga) is a commune in the Hautes-Pyrénées department in south-western France.

== See also ==
- Communes of the Hautes-Pyrénées department
