= Oléac-Dessus =

- Commune
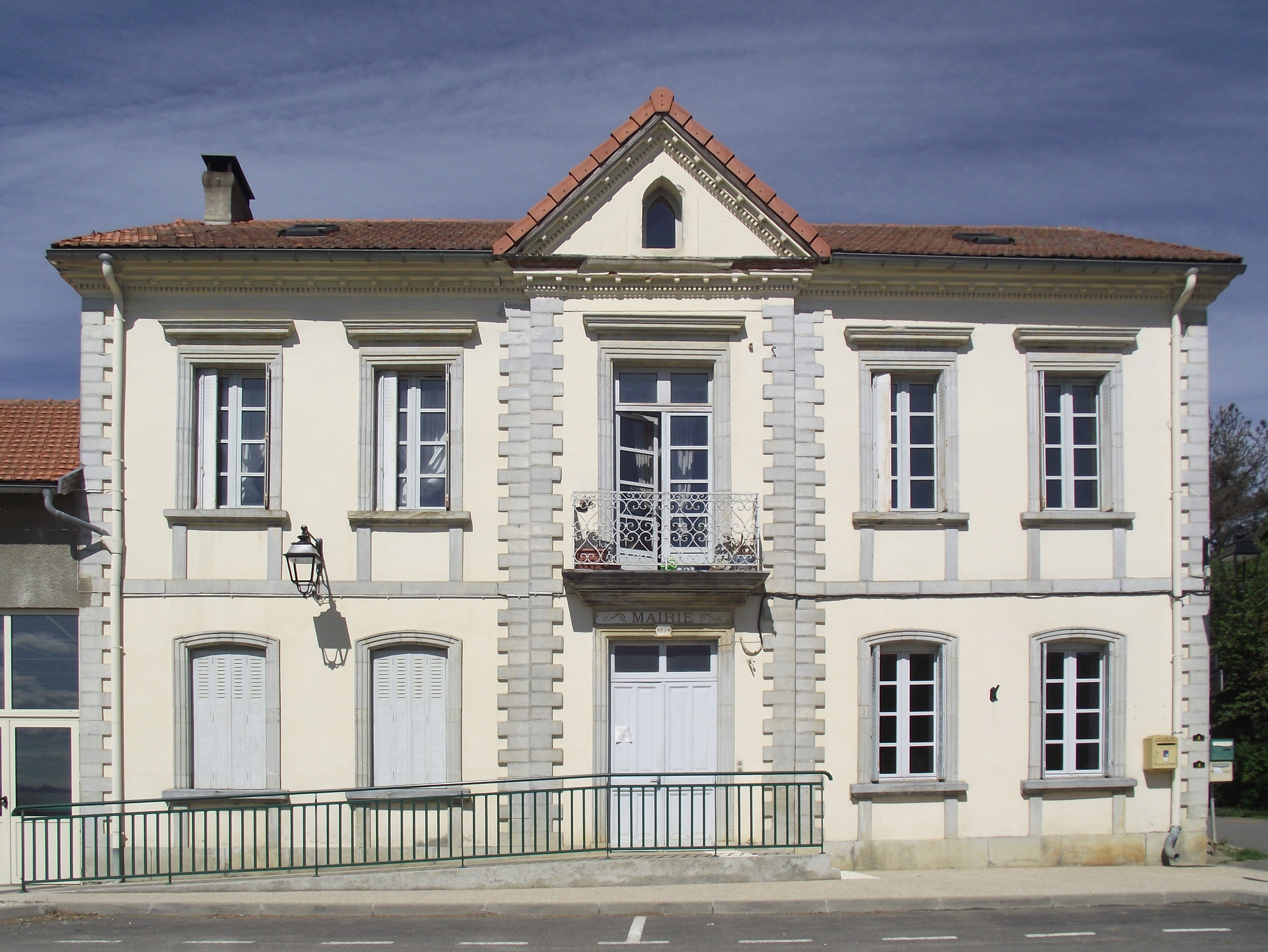
- The town hall
- Location of Oléac-Dessus
- Location within France Location within Occitanie
- Coordinates: 43°09′42″N 0°11′26″E
- Country: France
- Region: Occitania
- Department: Hautes-Pyrénées
- Arrondissement: Tarbes
- Canton: La Vallée de l'Arros et des Baïses
- Intercommunality: Coteaux du Val d'Arros

Government
  - Mayor (2020–2026): Cyrille Labat
- Area^{1}: 3.72 km^{2} (1.44 sq mi)
- Elevation: 460 m (1,510 ft)
- Highest elevation: 504 m (1,654 ft)
- Lowest elevation: 303 m (994 ft)
- Population (2023): 113
  - Density: 30.4/km^{2} (78.7/sq mi)
- Time zone: UTC+01:00 (CET)
  - Summer (DST): UTC+02:00 (CEST)
- INSEE/Postal code: 65333 /65190
- ^{1} French Land Register data, which excludes lakes, ponds, glaciers > 1 km^{2} (0.386 sq mi or 247 acres) and river estuaries.

Oléac-Dessus is a commune in the Hautes-Pyrénées department in south-western France.

== See also ==
- Communes of the Hautes-Pyrénées department
