= Burg, Hautes-Pyrénées =

Burg
- Commune
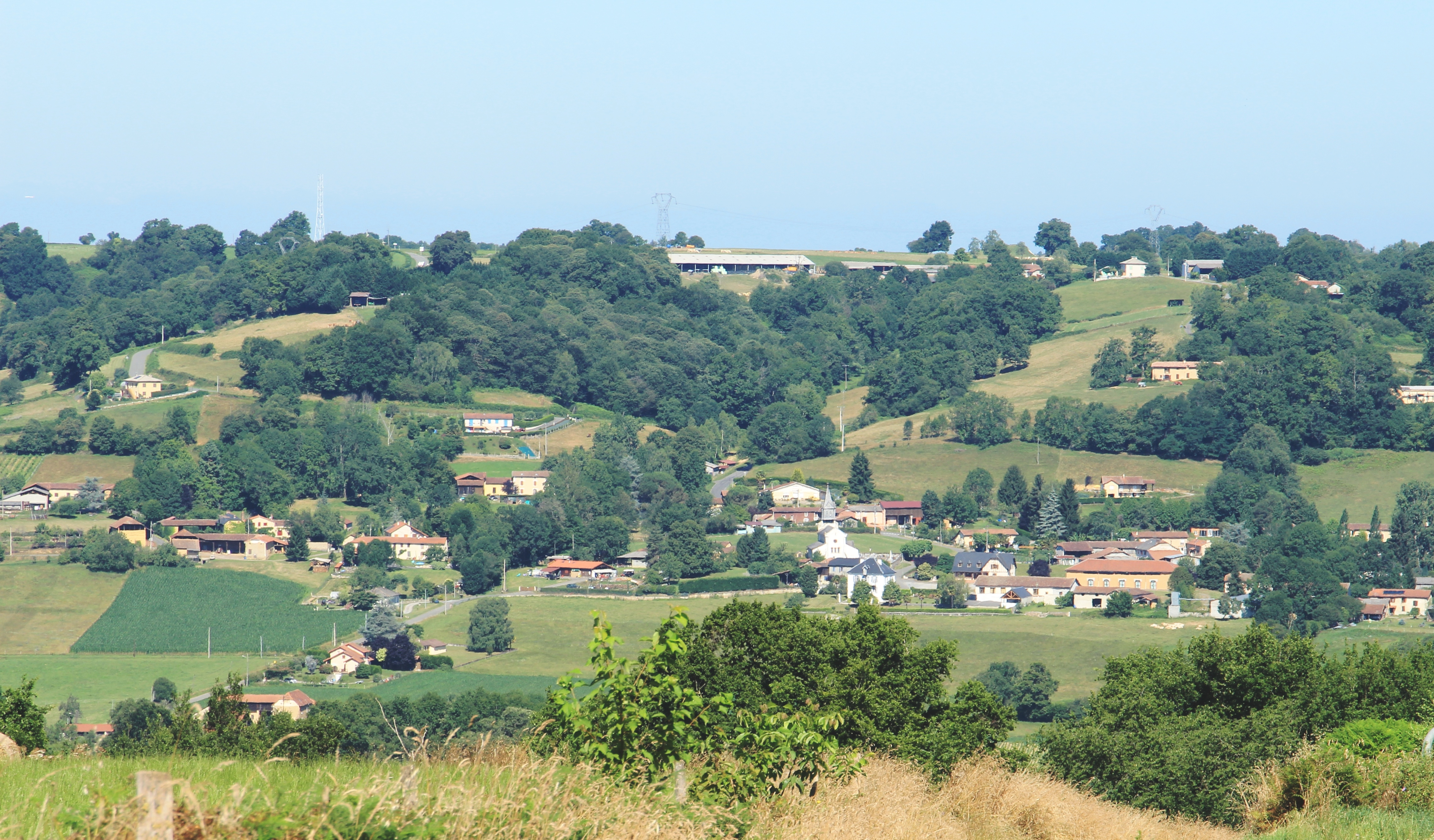
- View of Burg

- Coat of arms
- Location of Burg
- Location within France Location within Occitanie
- Coordinates: 43°11′25″N 0°19′37″E
- Country: France
- Region: Occitania
- Department: Hautes-Pyrénées
- Arrondissement: Tarbes
- Canton: La Vallée de l'Arros et des Baïses
- Area^{1}: 12.56 km^{2} (4.85 sq mi)
- Elevation: 507 m (1,663 ft)
- Highest elevation: 544 m (1,785 ft)
- Lowest elevation: 348 m (1,142 ft)
- Population (2023): 271
  - Density: 21.6/km^{2} (55.9/sq mi)
- Time zone: UTC+01:00 (CET)
  - Summer (DST): UTC+02:00 (CEST)
- INSEE/Postal code: 65113 /65190
- ^{1} French Land Register data, which excludes lakes, ponds, glaciers > 1 km^{2} (0.386 sq mi or 247 acres) and river estuaries.

Burg (Occitan: Borg) is a commune in the Hautes-Pyrénées department in southwestern France.

== Population ==
Historical population
Year	Pop.	±% p.a.
1968	323	—
1975	286	−1.72%
1982	297	+0.54%
1990	294	−0.13%
1999	267	−1.06%
2007	265	−0.09%
2012	270	+0.37%
2017	275	+0.37%
2023	271	−0.24%
Source: INSEE

== See also ==
- Communes of the Hautes-Pyrénées department
