= Lomné, Hautes-Pyrénées =

Lomné
- Commune
- Coat of arms
- Location of Lomné
- Location within France Location within Occitanie
- Coordinates: 43°02′42″N 0°17′49″E
- Country: France
- Region: Occitania
- Department: Hautes-Pyrénées
- Arrondissement: Bagnères-de-Bigorre
- Canton: La Vallée de l'Arros et des Baïses
- Intercommunality: Plateau de Lannemezan

Government
  - Mayor (2020–2026): Jérôme Morilhon
- Area^{1}: 2.94 km^{2} (1.14 sq mi)
- Elevation: 429 m (1,407 ft)
- Highest elevation: 703 m (2,306 ft)
- Lowest elevation: 393 m (1,289 ft)
- Population (2023): 39
  - Density: 13/km^{2} (34/sq mi)
- Time zone: UTC+01:00 (CET)
  - Summer (DST): UTC+02:00 (CEST)
- INSEE/Postal code: 65278 /65130
- ^{1} French Land Register data, which excludes lakes, ponds, glaciers > 1 km^{2} (0.386 sq mi or 247 acres) and river estuaries.

Lomné is a commune in the Hautes-Pyrénées department in south-western France.

== Geography ==
=== Climate ===
Lomné has an oceanic climate (Köppen climate classification Cfb). The average annual temperature in Lomné is 12.6 °C (54.7 °F). The average annual rainfall is 1,247.7 mm (49.12 in) with November as the wettest month. The temperatures are highest on average in August, at around 20.0 °C (68.0 °F), and lowest in January, at around 5.6 °C (42.1 °F). The highest temperature ever recorded in Lomné was 39.1 °C (102.4 °F) on 18 July 2022; the coldest temperature ever recorded was −13.4 °C (7.9 °F) on 8 February 2012.

Climate data for Lomné (1991−2020 normals, extremes 2007−present)
Month	Jan	Feb	Mar	Apr	May	Jun	Jul	Aug	Sep	Oct	Nov	Dec	Year
Record high °C (°F)	24.4 (75.9)	26.1 (79.0)	27.8 (82.0)	30.2 (86.4)	33.3 (91.9)	38.0 (100.4)	39.1 (102.4)	38.7 (101.7)	35.0 (95.0)	33.3 (91.9)	28.3 (82.9)	24.3 (75.7)	39.1 (102.4)
Mean daily maximum °C (°F)	11.4 (52.5)	12.6 (54.7)	15.0 (59.0)	18.3 (64.9)	20.8 (69.4)	24.2 (75.6)	26.2 (79.2)	26.4 (79.5)	24.0 (75.2)	20.5 (68.9)	15.0 (59.0)	12.8 (55.0)	18.9 (66.0)
Daily mean °C (°F)	5.6 (42.1)	6.3 (43.3)	8.6 (47.5)	11.7 (53.1)	14.5 (58.1)	17.9 (64.2)	19.9 (67.8)	20.0 (68.0)	17.1 (62.8)	13.7 (56.7)	8.9 (48.0)	6.6 (43.9)	12.6 (54.7)
Mean daily minimum °C (°F)	−0.2 (31.6)	0.1 (32.2)	2.1 (35.8)	5.0 (41.0)	8.2 (46.8)	11.5 (52.7)	13.7 (56.7)	13.5 (56.3)	10.2 (50.4)	7.0 (44.6)	2.9 (37.2)	0.3 (32.5)	6.2 (43.2)
Record low °C (°F)	−11.0 (12.2)	−13.4 (7.9)	−6.3 (20.7)	−4.6 (23.7)	−1.8 (28.8)	1.8 (35.2)	5.1 (41.2)	5.3 (41.5)	0.4 (32.7)	−4.3 (24.3)	−8.9 (16.0)	−10.0 (14.0)	−13.4 (7.9)
Average precipitation mm (inches)	118.4 (4.66)	105.6 (4.16)	103.3 (4.07)	126.5 (4.98)	137.5 (5.41)	109.1 (4.30)	86.8 (3.42)	79.8 (3.14)	66.4 (2.61)	78.7 (3.10)	145.7 (5.74)	89.9 (3.54)	1,247.7 (49.12)
Average precipitation days (≥ 1.0 mm)	12.1	11.5	12.8	13.4	13.3	12.8	11.1	11.3	8.6	9.2	12.5	10.7	139.2
Source: Météo-France

== See also ==
- Communes of the Hautes-Pyrénées department
