= Bégole =

- Commune
- Coat of arms
- Location of Bégole
- Location within France Location within Occitanie
- Coordinates: 43°09′27″N 0°19′46″E
- Country: France
- Region: Occitania
- Department: Hautes-Pyrénées
- Arrondissement: Tarbes
- Canton: La Vallée de l'Arros et des Baïses
- Intercommunality: Coteaux du Val d'Arros

Government
  - Mayor (2020–2026): Gérard Daries
- Area^{1}: 10.24 km^{2} (3.95 sq mi)
- Elevation: 520 m (1,710 ft)
- Highest elevation: 583 m (1,913 ft)
- Lowest elevation: 337 m (1,106 ft)
- Population (2023): 189
  - Density: 18.5/km^{2} (47.8/sq mi)
- Time zone: UTC+01:00 (CET)
  - Summer (DST): UTC+02:00 (CEST)
- INSEE/Postal code: 65079 /65190
- ^{1} French Land Register data, which excludes lakes, ponds, glaciers > 1 km^{2} (0.386 sq mi or 247 acres) and river estuaries.

Bégole (French pronunciation: [beɡɔl]; Occitan: Begòla) is a commune in the Hautes-Pyrénées department in southwestern France.

== Population ==
Historical population
Year	Pop.	±% p.a.
1968	187	—
1975	172	−1.19%
1982	149	−2.03%
1990	170	+1.66%
1999	176	+0.39%
2007	170	−0.43%
2012	214	+4.71%
2017	203	−1.05%
2023	189	−1.18%
Source: INSEE

== See also ==
- Communes of the Hautes-Pyrénées department
