= Poumarous =

- Commune
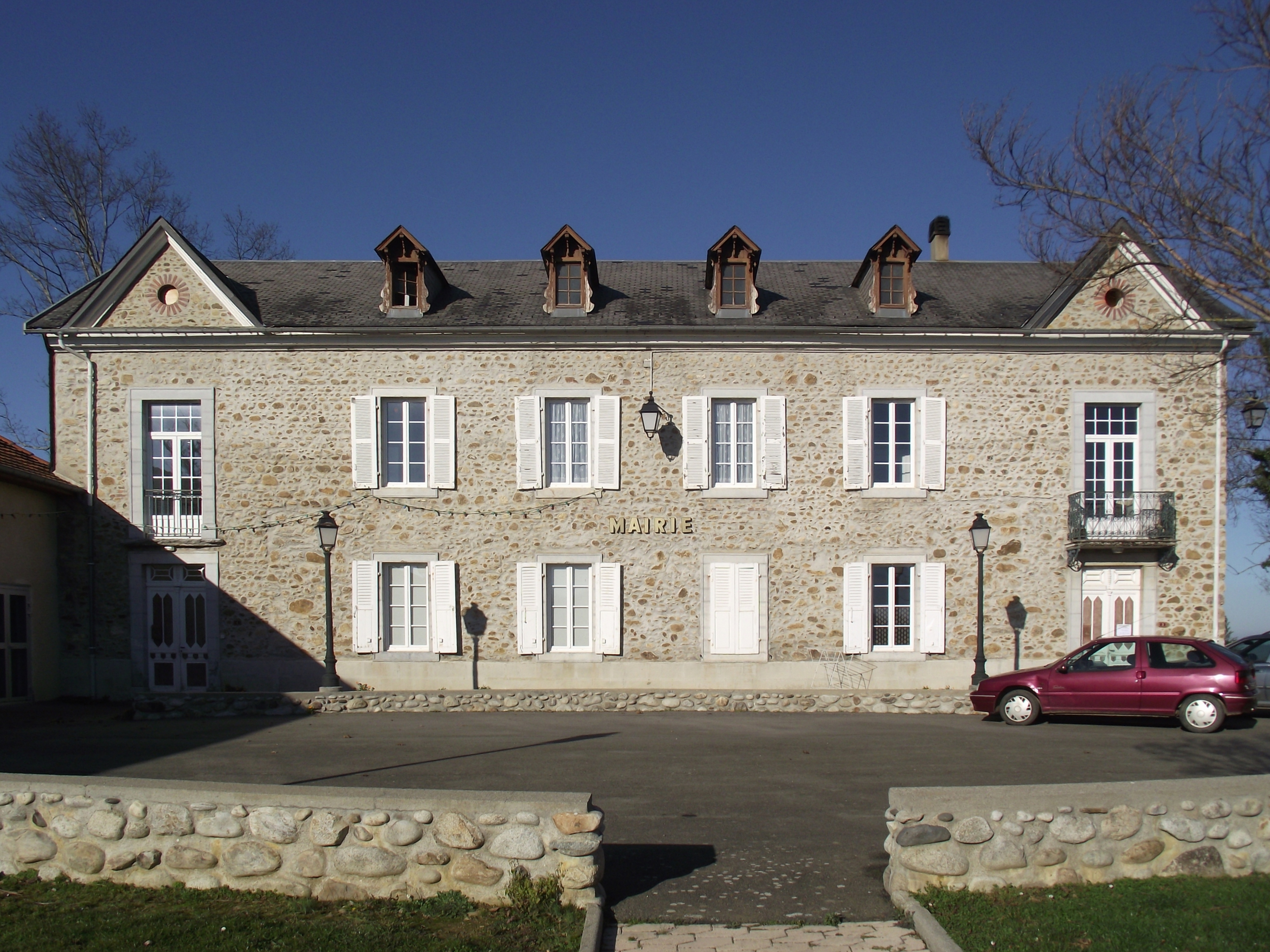
- The town hall

- Coat of arms
- Location of Poumarous
- Location within France Location within Occitanie
- Coordinates: 43°09′10″N 0°12′46″E
- Country: France
- Region: Occitania
- Department: Hautes-Pyrénées
- Arrondissement: Tarbes
- Canton: La Vallée de l'Arros et des Baïses
- Intercommunality: Coteaux du Val d'Arros

Government
  - Mayor (2020–2026): Rémy Lesaulnier
- Area^{1}: 5.68 km^{2} (2.19 sq mi)
- Elevation: 479 m (1,572 ft)
- Highest elevation: 500 m (1,600 ft)
- Lowest elevation: 280 m (920 ft)
- Population (2023): 148
  - Density: 26.1/km^{2} (67.5/sq mi)
- Time zone: UTC+01:00 (CET)
  - Summer (DST): UTC+02:00 (CEST)
- INSEE/Postal code: 65367 /65190
- ^{1} French Land Register data, which excludes lakes, ponds, glaciers > 1 km^{2} (0.386 sq mi or 247 acres) and river estuaries.

Poumarous is a commune in the Hautes-Pyrénées department in south-western France.

== See also ==
- Communes of the Hautes-Pyrénées department
