= Hauban =

- Commune
- Coat of arms
- Location of Hauban
- Location within France Location within Occitanie
- Coordinates: 43°05′41″N 0°09′49″E
- Country: France
- Region: Occitania
- Department: Hautes-Pyrénées
- Arrondissement: Bagnères-de-Bigorre
- Canton: La Vallée de l'Arros et des Baïses
- Intercommunality: CC de la Haute-Bigorre

Government
  - Mayor (2020–2026): Jean-Claude Dessain
- Area^{1}: 2.14 km^{2} (0.83 sq mi)
- Elevation: 600 m (2,000 ft)
- Highest elevation: 629 m (2,064 ft)
- Lowest elevation: 459 m (1,506 ft)
- Population (2023): 94
  - Density: 44/km^{2} (110/sq mi)
- Time zone: UTC+01:00 (CET)
  - Summer (DST): UTC+02:00 (CEST)
- INSEE/Postal code: 65216 /65200
- ^{1} French Land Register data, which excludes lakes, ponds, glaciers > 1 km^{2} (0.386 sq mi or 247 acres) and river estuaries.

Hauban (French pronunciation: [obɑ̃]) is a commune in the Hautes-Pyrénées department in south-western France.

== See also ==
- Communes of the Hautes-Pyrénées department
