= Lanespède =

- Commune
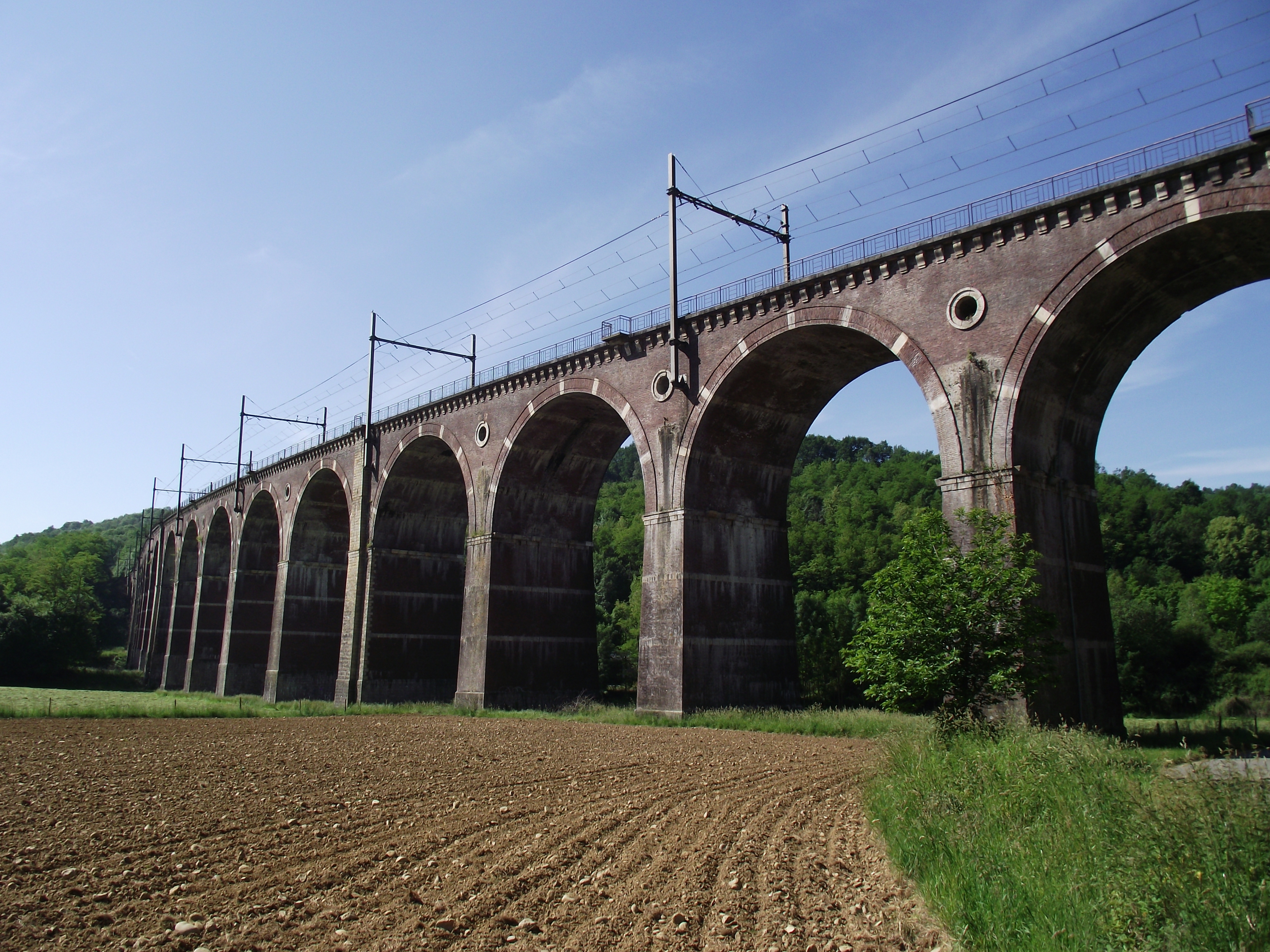
- The railway viaduct

- Coat of arms
- Location of Lanespède
- Location within France Location within Occitanie
- Coordinates: 43°10′04″N 0°16′03″E
- Country: France
- Region: Occitania
- Department: Hautes-Pyrénées
- Arrondissement: Tarbes
- Canton: La Vallée de l'Arros et des Baïses
- Intercommunality: Coteaux du Val d'Arros

Government
  - Mayor (2020–2026): Paul-Joseph Espurt
- Area^{1}: 4.47 km^{2} (1.73 sq mi)
- Elevation: 320 m (1,050 ft)
- Highest elevation: 508 m (1,667 ft)
- Lowest elevation: 288 m (945 ft)
- Population (2023): 144
  - Density: 32.2/km^{2} (83.4/sq mi)
- Time zone: UTC+01:00 (CET)
  - Summer (DST): UTC+02:00 (CEST)
- INSEE/Postal code: 65256 /65190
- ^{1} French Land Register data, which excludes lakes, ponds, glaciers > 1 km^{2} (0.386 sq mi or 247 acres) and river estuaries.

Lanespède (French pronunciation: [lanɛspɛd]; Occitan: Lanespeda) is a commune in the Hautes-Pyrénées department in south-western France.

== See also ==
- Communes of the Hautes-Pyrénées department
