= Tilhouse =

- Commune
- Coat of arms
- Location of Tilhouse
- Location within France Location within Occitanie
- Coordinates: 43°05′18″N 0°18′35″E
- Country: France
- Region: Occitania
- Department: Hautes-Pyrénées
- Arrondissement: Bagnères-de-Bigorre
- Canton: La Vallée de l'Arros et des Baïses
- Intercommunality: Plateau de Lannemezan

Government
  - Mayor (2020–2026): Joëlle Abadie
- Area^{1}: 6.51 km^{2} (2.51 sq mi)
- Elevation: 622 m (2,041 ft)
- Highest elevation: 664 m (2,178 ft)
- Lowest elevation: 353 m (1,158 ft)
- Population (2023): 225
  - Density: 34.6/km^{2} (89.5/sq mi)
- Time zone: UTC+01:00 (CET)
  - Summer (DST): UTC+02:00 (CEST)
- INSEE/Postal code: 65445 /65130
- ^{1} French Land Register data, which excludes lakes, ponds, glaciers > 1 km^{2} (0.386 sq mi or 247 acres) and river estuaries.

Tilhouse (French pronunciation: [tijuz]; Occitan: Telhosa) is a commune in the Hautes-Pyrénées department in south-western France.

== See also ==
- Communes of the Hautes-Pyrénées department
