= Batsère =

- Commune
- Coat of arms
- Location of Batsère
- Location within France Location within Occitanie
- Coordinates: 43°03′46″N 0°17′24″E
- Country: France
- Region: Occitania
- Department: Hautes-Pyrénées
- Arrondissement: Bagnères-de-Bigorre
- Canton: La Vallée de l'Arros et des Baïses

Government
  - Mayor (2020–2026): Hervé Carrère
- Area^{1}: 2.3 km^{2} (0.89 sq mi)
- Elevation: 450 m (1,480 ft)
- Highest elevation: 634 m (2,080 ft)
- Lowest elevation: 387 m (1,270 ft)
- Population (2023): 42
  - Density: 18/km^{2} (47/sq mi)
- Time zone: UTC+01:00 (CET)
  - Summer (DST): UTC+02:00 (CEST)
- INSEE/Postal code: 65071 /65130
- ^{1} French Land Register data, which excludes lakes, ponds, glaciers > 1 km^{2} (0.386 sq mi or 247 acres) and river estuaries.

Batsère (French pronunciation: [batsɛʁ]; Occitan: Vathsèra) is a commune in the Hautes-Pyrénées department in southwestern France.

== Geography ==
Batsère is located 26 km (orthodromic distance) from Tarbes, prefecture of the department and 11 km from Bagnères-de-Bigorre.

The territory of the commune is vulnerable to various natural hazards: meteorological (storms, thunderstorms, snow, extreme cold, heat wave or drought), floods, forest fires, land movements and earthquakes (medium seismicity).

== Population ==
Batsère is a rural commune with 31 inhabitants as of 2021. There was a peak population of 179 in 1872. Its inhabitants are called Batsérois or Batséroises in French.

Historical population
Year	Pop.	±% p.a.
1968	43	—
1975	39	−1.39%
1982	30	−3.68%
1990	36	+2.31%
1999	38	+0.60%
2007	45	+2.14%
2012	43	−0.91%
2017	36	−3.49%
2023	42	+2.60%
Source: INSEE

== See also ==
- Communes of the Hautes-Pyrénées department
