= Houeydets =

- Commune
- Coat of arms
- Location of Houeydets
- Location within France Location within Occitanie
- Coordinates: 43°09′41″N 0°21′12″E
- Country: France
- Region: Occitania
- Department: Hautes-Pyrénées
- Arrondissement: Bagnères-de-Bigorre
- Canton: La Vallée de l'Arros et des Baïses
- Intercommunality: Plateau de Lannemezan

Government
  - Mayor (2020–2026): André Quinon
- Area^{1}: 7.53 km^{2} (2.91 sq mi)
- Elevation: 600 m (2,000 ft)
- Highest elevation: 584 m (1,916 ft)
- Lowest elevation: 414 m (1,358 ft)
- Population (2023): 287
  - Density: 38.1/km^{2} (98.7/sq mi)
- Time zone: UTC+01:00 (CET)
  - Summer (DST): UTC+02:00 (CEST)
- INSEE/Postal code: 65224 /65330
- ^{1} French Land Register data, which excludes lakes, ponds, glaciers > 1 km^{2} (0.386 sq mi or 247 acres) and river estuaries.

Houeydets is a commune in the Hautes-Pyrénées department in south-western France.

== See also ==
- Communes of the Hautes-Pyrénées department
