= Libaros =

- Commune
- Coat of arms
- Location of Libaros
- Location within France Location within Occitanie
- Coordinates: 43°15′16″N 0°23′31″E
- Country: France
- Region: Occitania
- Department: Hautes-Pyrénées
- Arrondissement: Bagnères-de-Bigorre
- Canton: La Vallée de l'Arros et des Baïses
- Intercommunality: Plateau de Lannemezan

Government
  - Mayor (2020–2026): Dominique Demimuid
- Area^{1}: 9.08 km^{2} (3.51 sq mi)
- Elevation: 380 m (1,250 ft)
- Highest elevation: 484 m (1,588 ft)
- Lowest elevation: 268 m (879 ft)
- Population (2023): 133
  - Density: 14.6/km^{2} (37.9/sq mi)
- Time zone: UTC+01:00 (CET)
  - Summer (DST): UTC+02:00 (CEST)
- INSEE/Postal code: 65274 /65330
- ^{1} French Land Register data, which excludes lakes, ponds, glaciers > 1 km^{2} (0.386 sq mi or 247 acres) and river estuaries.

Libaros (French pronunciation: [libaʁɔs]; Occitan: Libaròs) is a commune in the Hautes-Pyrénées department in south-western France.

== See also ==
- Communes of the Hautes-Pyrénées department
