= Canton of La Vallée de l'Arros et des Baïses =

Canton of France

Coordinates: 43.19°N 0.25°E

The canton of La Vallée de l'Arros et des Baïses is an administrative division of the Hautes-Pyrénées department, southwestern France. It was created at the French canton reorganisation which came into effect in March 2015. Its seat is in Tournay.

It consists of the following communes:

1. Argelès-Bagnères
2. Arrodets
3. Artiguemy
4. Asque
5. Banios
6. Barbazan-Dessus
7. Batsère
8. Bégole
9. Benqué-Molère
10. Bernadets-Dessus
11. Bettes
12. Bonnemazon
13. Bonrepos
14. Bordes
15. Bourg-de-Bigorre
16. Bulan
17. Burg
18. Caharet
19. Calavanté
20. Castelbajac
21. Castéra-Lanusse
22. Castillon
23. Chelle-Spou
24. Cieutat
25. Clarac
26. Esconnets
27. Escots
28. Espèche
29. Espieilh
30. Fréchendets
31. Fréchou-Fréchet
32. Galan
33. Galez
34. Goudon
35. Gourgue
36. Hauban
37. Hitte
38. Houeydets
39. Lanespède
40. Lespouey
41. Lhez
42. Libaros
43. Lies
44. Lomné
45. Luc
46. Lutilhous
47. Marsas
48. Mascaras
49. Mauvezin
50. Mérilheu
51. Montastruc
52. Moulédous
53. Oléac-Dessus
54. Orieux
55. Orignac
56. Oueilloux
57. Ozon
58. Péré
59. Peyraube
60. Poumarous
61. Recurt
62. Ricaud
63. Sabarros
64. Sarlabous
65. Sentous
66. Sinzos
67. Tilhouse
68. Tournay
69. Tournous-Devant
70. Uzer
