= Lies, Hautes-Pyrénées =

Lies
- Commune
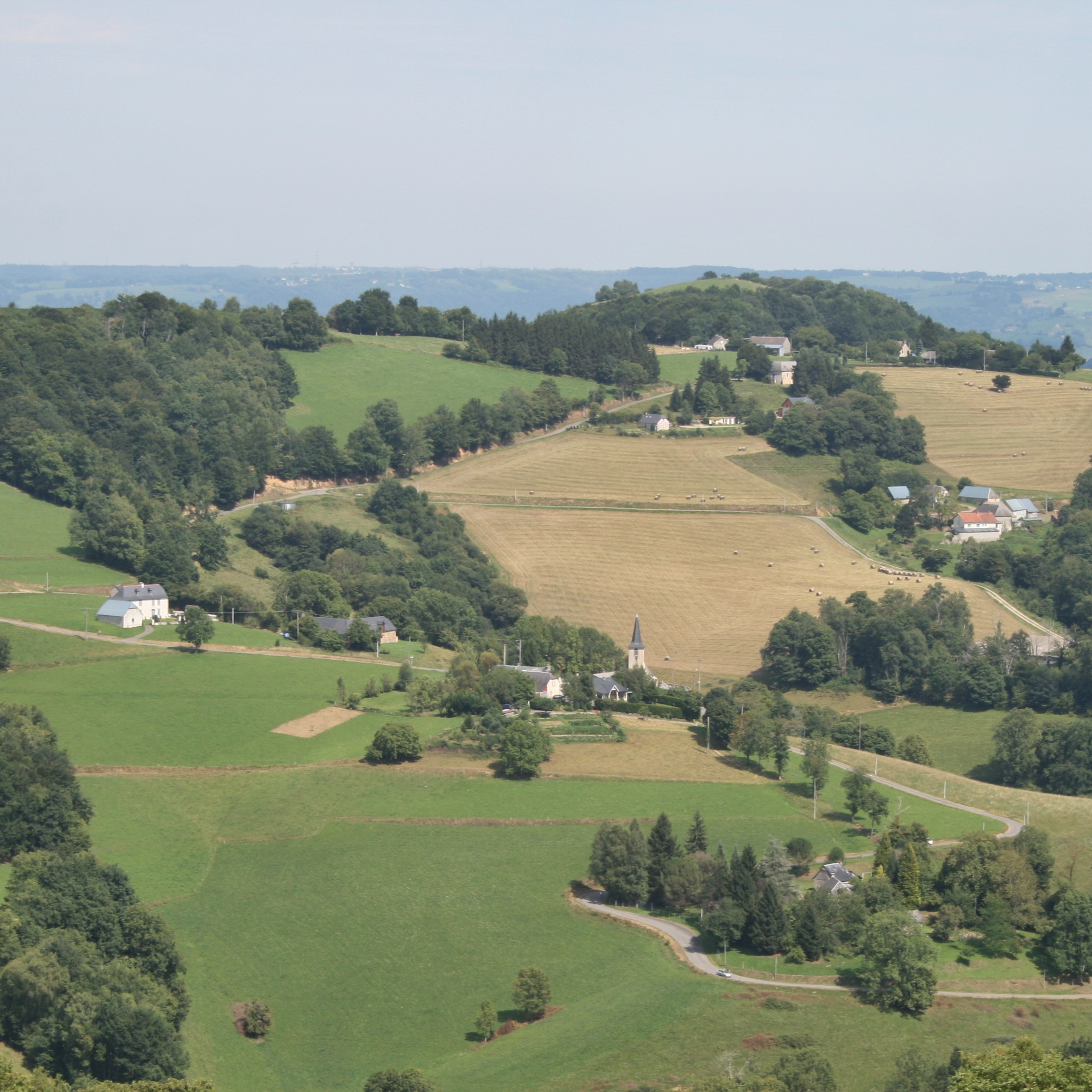

- Coat of arms
- Location of Lies
- Location within France Location within Occitanie
- Coordinates: 43°04′N 0°13′E
- Country: France
- Region: Occitania
- Department: Hautes-Pyrénées
- Arrondissement: Bagnères-de-Bigorre
- Canton: La Vallée de l'Arros et des Baïses
- Intercommunality: Haute-Bigorre

Government
  - Mayor (2020–2026): Florence Poizat
- Area^{1}: 3.66 km^{2} (1.41 sq mi)
- Elevation: 750 m (2,460 ft)
- Highest elevation: 810 m (2,660 ft)
- Lowest elevation: 530 m (1,740 ft)
- Population (2023): 73
  - Density: 20/km^{2} (52/sq mi)
- Time zone: UTC+01:00 (CET)
  - Summer (DST): UTC+02:00 (CEST)
- INSEE/Postal code: 65275 /65200
- ^{1} French Land Register data, which excludes lakes, ponds, glaciers > 1 km^{2} (0.386 sq mi or 247 acres) and river estuaries.

Lies (Occitan: Liens) is a commune in the Hautes-Pyrénées department in south-western France.

== See also ==
- Communes of the Hautes-Pyrénées department
