= Fréchendets =

- Commune
- Coat of arms
- Location of Fréchendets
- Location within France Location within Occitanie
- Coordinates: 43°03′47″N 0°14′26″E
- Country: France
- Region: Occitania
- Department: Hautes-Pyrénées
- Arrondissement: Bagnères-de-Bigorre
- Canton: La Vallée de l'Arros et des Baïses
- Intercommunality: Plateau de Lannemezan

Government
  - Mayor (2024–2026): Débora Kaiser
- Area^{1}: 2.02 km^{2} (0.78 sq mi)
- Elevation: 520 m (1,710 ft)
- Highest elevation: 735 m (2,411 ft)
- Lowest elevation: 416 m (1,365 ft)
- Population (2023): 36
  - Density: 18/km^{2} (46/sq mi)
- Time zone: UTC+01:00 (CET)
  - Summer (DST): UTC+02:00 (CEST)
- INSEE/Postal code: 65179 /65130
- ^{1} French Land Register data, which excludes lakes, ponds, glaciers > 1 km^{2} (0.386 sq mi or 247 acres) and river estuaries.

Fréchendets is a commune in the Hautes-Pyrénées department in south-western France.

== See also ==
- Communes of the Hautes-Pyrénées department
