= Bonrepos =

- Commune
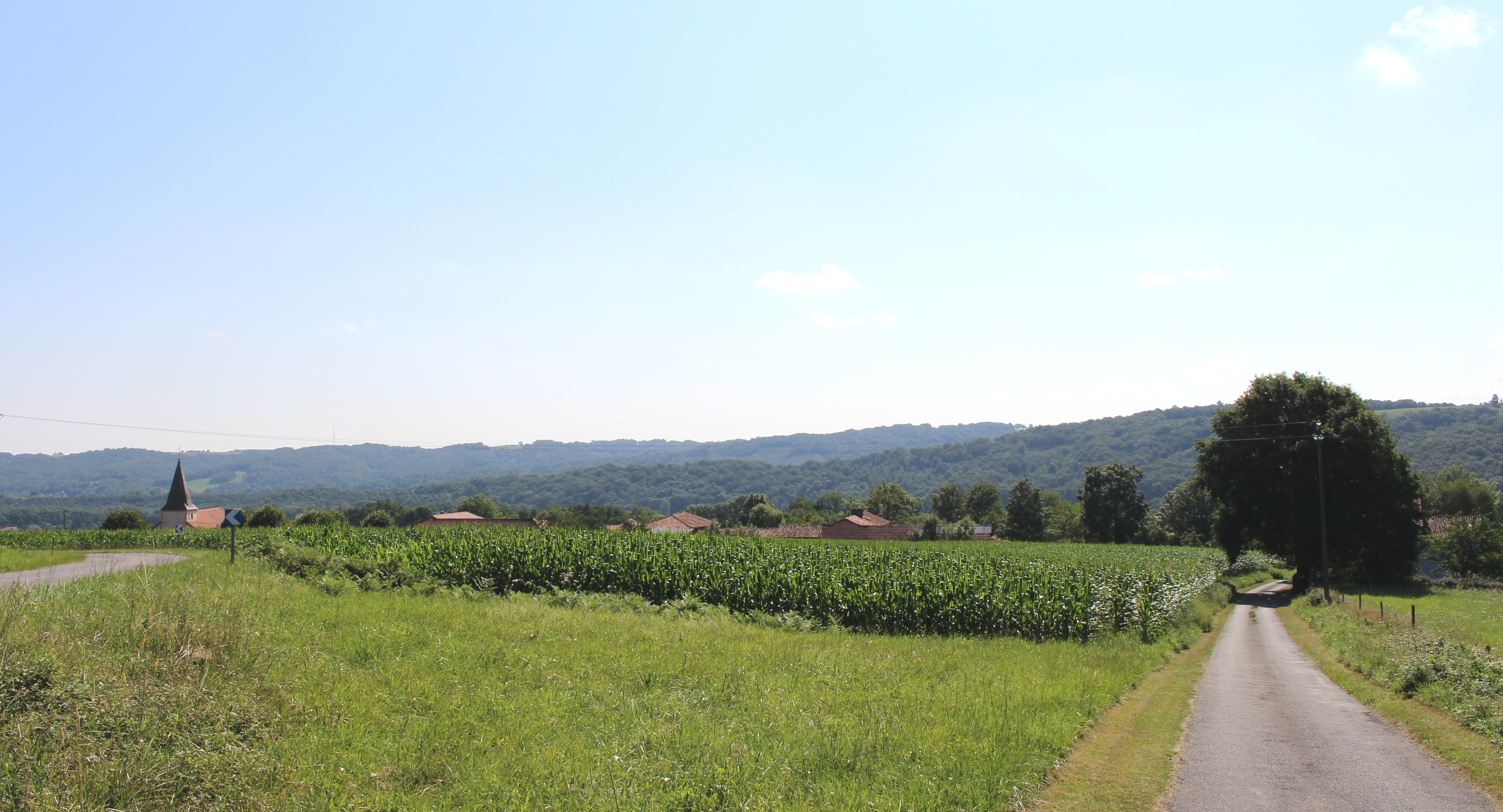
- View of Bonrepos

- Coat of arms
- Location of Bonrepos
- Location within France Location within Occitanie
- Coordinates: 43°11′37″N 0°22′33″E
- Country: France
- Region: Occitania
- Department: Hautes-Pyrénées
- Arrondissement: Bagnères-de-Bigorre
- Canton: La Vallée de l'Arros et des Baïses

Government
  - Mayor (2020–2026): Jean-Claude Jacomet
- Area^{1}: 8.8 km^{2} (3.4 sq mi)
- Elevation: 520 m (1,710 ft)
- Highest elevation: 540 m (1,770 ft)
- Lowest elevation: 359 m (1,178 ft)
- Population (2023): 194
  - Density: 22/km^{2} (57/sq mi)
- Time zone: UTC+01:00 (CET)
  - Summer (DST): UTC+02:00 (CEST)
- INSEE/Postal code: 65097 /65330
- ^{1} French Land Register data, which excludes lakes, ponds, glaciers > 1 km^{2} (0.386 sq mi or 247 acres) and river estuaries.

Bonrepos is a commune in the Hautes-Pyrénées department in southwestern France.

== Population ==
Historical population
Year	Pop.	±% p.a.
1968	256	—
1975	263	+0.39%
1982	216	−2.77%
1990	194	−1.33%
1999	188	−0.35%
2007	172	−1.11%
2012	197	+2.75%
2017	187	−1.04%
2023	194	+0.61%
Source: INSEE

== See also ==
- Communes of the Hautes-Pyrénées department
