= Clarac, Hautes-Pyrénées =

Clarac
- Commune
- Coat of arms
- Location of Clarac
- Location within France Location within Occitanie
- Coordinates: 43°13′23″N 0°14′47″E
- Country: France
- Region: Occitania
- Department: Hautes-Pyrénées
- Arrondissement: Tarbes
- Canton: La Vallée de l'Arros et des Baïses
- Intercommunality: Coteaux du Val d'Arros

Government
  - Mayor (2020–2026): Maria Lecaudey
- Area^{1}: 6.36 km^{2} (2.46 sq mi)
- Elevation: 264 m (866 ft)
- Highest elevation: 485 m (1,591 ft)
- Lowest elevation: 235 m (771 ft)
- Population (2023): 160
  - Density: 25/km^{2} (65/sq mi)
- Time zone: UTC+01:00 (CET)
  - Summer (DST): UTC+02:00 (CEST)
- INSEE/Postal code: 65149 /65190
- ^{1} French Land Register data, which excludes lakes, ponds, glaciers > 1 km^{2} (0.386 sq mi or 247 acres) and river estuaries.

Clarac (French pronunciation: [klaʁak]) is a commune in the Hautes-Pyrénées department in south-western France.

== See also ==
- Communes of the Hautes-Pyrénées department
