= Lespouey =

- Commune
- Coat of arms
- Location of Lespouey
- Location within France Location within Occitanie
- Coordinates: 43°12′42″N 0°10′11″E
- Country: France
- Region: Occitania
- Department: Hautes-Pyrénées
- Arrondissement: Tarbes
- Canton: La Vallée de l'Arros et des Baïses
- Intercommunality: Coteaux du Val d'Arros

Government
  - Mayor (2020–2026): Émile Scherrer
- Area^{1}: 2.96 km^{2} (1.14 sq mi)
- Elevation: 321 m (1,053 ft)
- Highest elevation: 411 m (1,348 ft)
- Lowest elevation: 264 m (866 ft)
- Population (2023): 210
  - Density: 71/km^{2} (180/sq mi)
- Time zone: UTC+01:00 (CET)
  - Summer (DST): UTC+02:00 (CEST)
- INSEE/Postal code: 65270 /65190
- ^{1} French Land Register data, which excludes lakes, ponds, glaciers > 1 km^{2} (0.386 sq mi or 247 acres) and river estuaries.

Lespouey (French pronunciation: [lɛspuɛ]; Occitan: Lespuei) is a commune in the Hautes-Pyrénées department in the south west of France.

== See also ==
- Communes of the Hautes-Pyrénées department
