= Castillon, Hautes-Pyrénées =

Castillon
- Commune
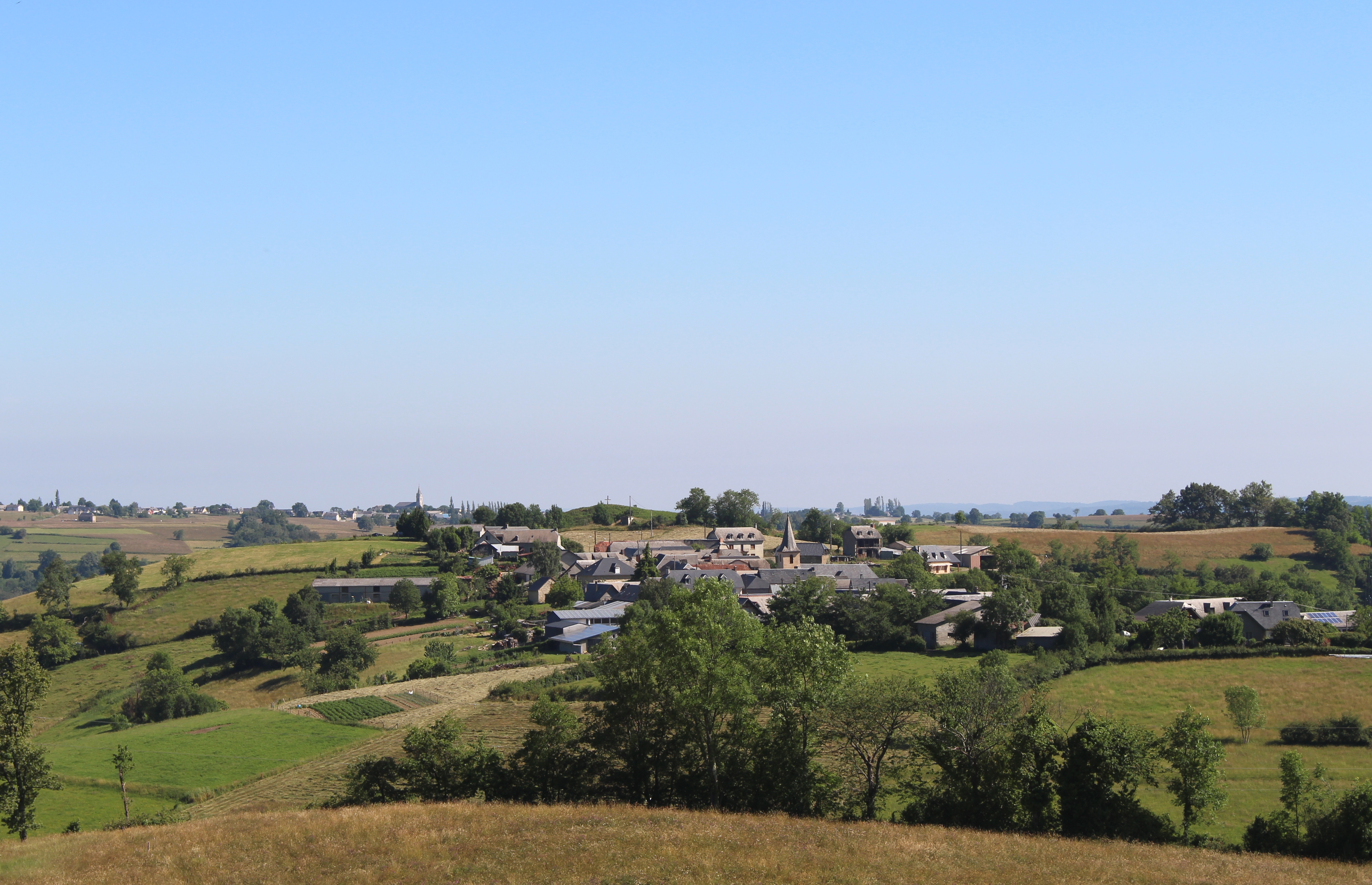
- View of Castillon

- Coat of arms
- Location of Castillon
- Location within France Location within Occitanie
- Coordinates: 43°05′21″N 0°12′55″E
- Country: France
- Region: Occitania
- Department: Hautes-Pyrénées
- Arrondissement: Bagnères-de-Bigorre
- Canton: La Vallée de l'Arros et des Baïses
- Intercommunality: Plateau de Lannemezan

Government
  - Mayor (2020–2026): Jean-Marie Vignes
- Area^{1}: 3.32 km^{2} (1.28 sq mi)
- Elevation: 565 m (1,854 ft)
- Highest elevation: 585 m (1,919 ft)
- Lowest elevation: 334 m (1,096 ft)
- Population (2023): 73
  - Density: 22/km^{2} (57/sq mi)
- Time zone: UTC+01:00 (CET)
  - Summer (DST): UTC+02:00 (CEST)
- INSEE/Postal code: 65135 /65130
- ^{1} French Land Register data, which excludes lakes, ponds, glaciers > 1 km^{2} (0.386 sq mi or 247 acres) and river estuaries.

Castillon (French pronunciation: [kastijɔ̃]; Occitan: Castilhon) is a commune in the Hautes-Pyrénées department in south-western France.

== See also ==
- Communes of the Hautes-Pyrénées department
