= Ricaud, Hautes-Pyrénées =

Ricaud
- Commune
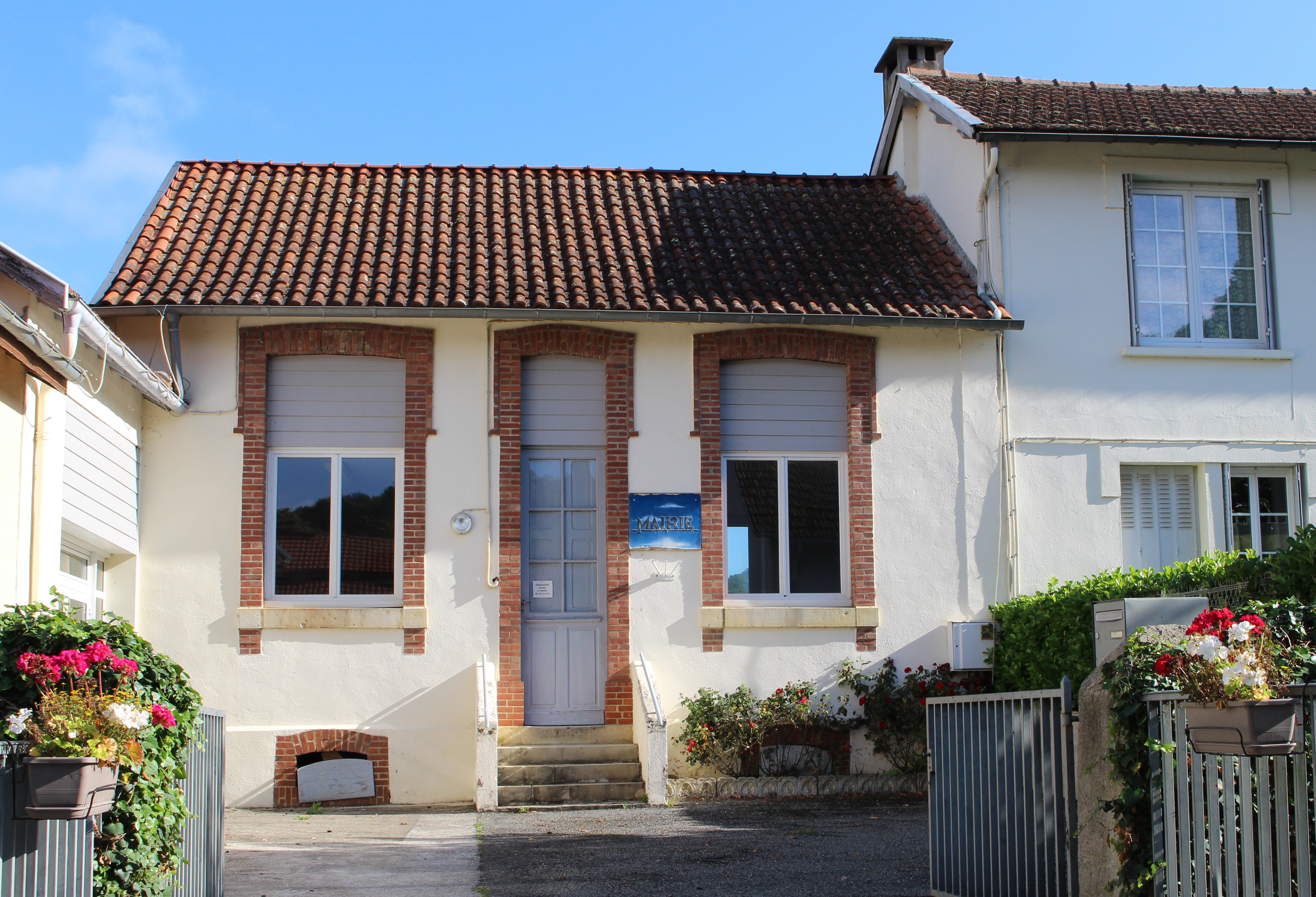
- Town hall

- Coat of arms
- Location of Ricaud
- Location within France Location within Occitanie
- Coordinates: 43°08′56″N 0°15′52″E
- Country: France
- Region: Occitania
- Department: Hautes-Pyrénées
- Arrondissement: Tarbes
- Canton: La Vallée de l'Arros et des Baïses
- Intercommunality: Coteaux du Val d'Arros

Government
  - Mayor (2020–2026): Alain Pailhe
- Area^{1}: 3.3 km^{2} (1.3 sq mi)
- Elevation: 310 m (1,020 ft)
- Highest elevation: 546 m (1,791 ft)
- Lowest elevation: 279 m (915 ft)
- Population (2023): 72
  - Density: 22/km^{2} (57/sq mi)
- Time zone: UTC+01:00 (CET)
  - Summer (DST): UTC+02:00 (CEST)
- INSEE/Postal code: 65378 /65190
- ^{1} French Land Register data, which excludes lakes, ponds, glaciers > 1 km^{2} (0.386 sq mi or 247 acres) and river estuaries.

Ricaud (French pronunciation: [ʁiko]; Occitan: Ricau) is a commune in the Hautes-Pyrénées department in south-western France.

== See also ==
- Communes of the Hautes-Pyrénées department
