= Peyraube =

- Commune
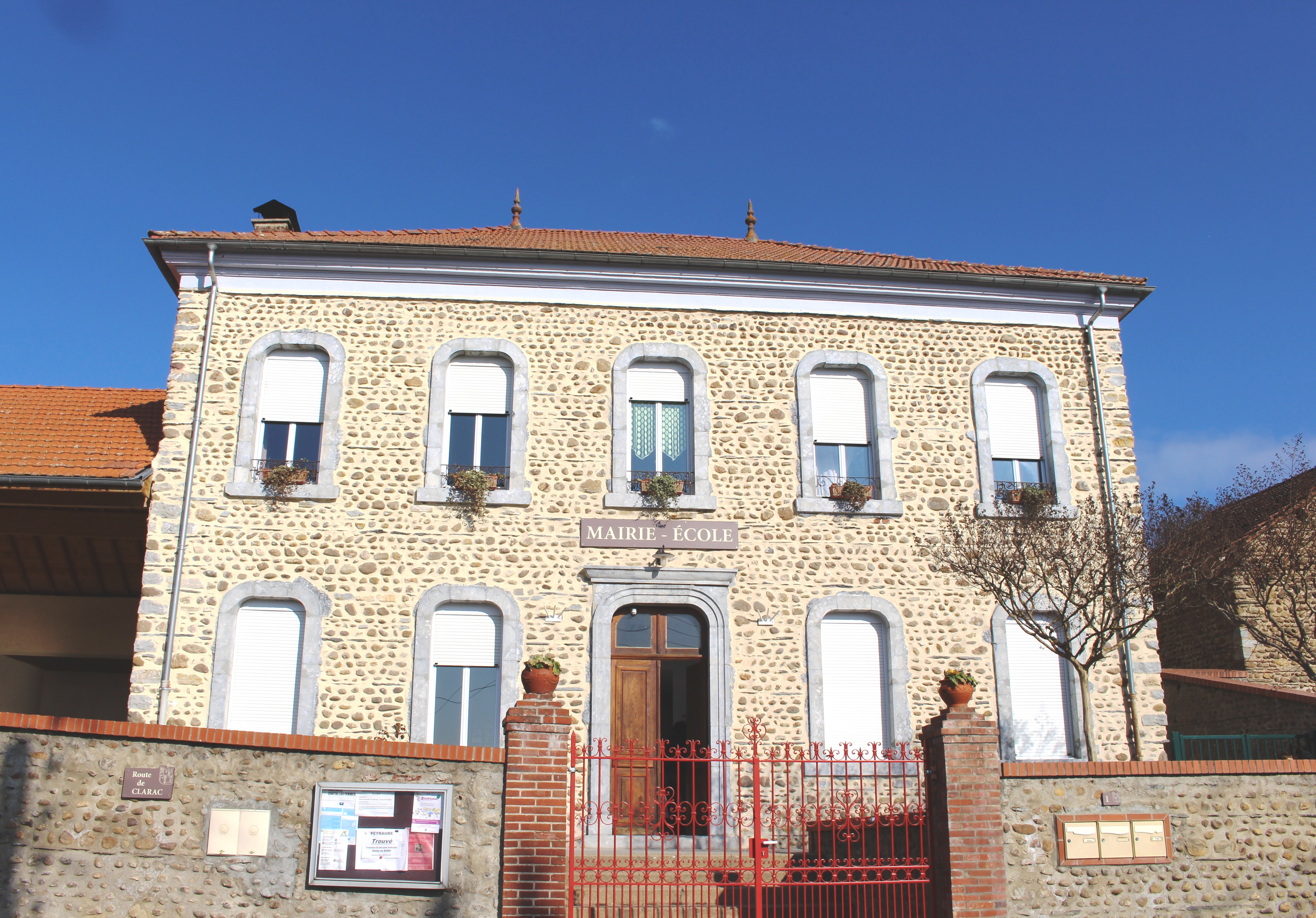
- Town hall

- Coat of arms
- Location of Peyraube
- Location within France Location within Occitanie
- Coordinates: 43°12′09″N 0°14′44″E
- Country: France
- Region: Occitania
- Department: Hautes-Pyrénées
- Arrondissement: Tarbes
- Canton: La Vallée de l'Arros et des Baïses
- Intercommunality: Coteaux du Val d'Arros

Government
  - Mayor (2020–2026): Bernard Larré
- Area^{1}: 3.46 km^{2} (1.34 sq mi)
- Elevation: 260 m (850 ft)
- Highest elevation: 486 m (1,594 ft)
- Lowest elevation: 246 m (807 ft)
- Population (2023): 174
  - Density: 50.3/km^{2} (130/sq mi)
- Time zone: UTC+01:00 (CET)
  - Summer (DST): UTC+02:00 (CEST)
- INSEE/Postal code: 65357 /65190
- ^{1} French Land Register data, which excludes lakes, ponds, glaciers > 1 km^{2} (0.386 sq mi or 247 acres) and river estuaries.

Peyraube (French pronunciation: [peʁob]; Occitan: Peirauba) is a commune in the Hautes-Pyrénées department in southwestern France.

== See also ==
- Communes of the Hautes-Pyrénées department
