= Goudon =

- Commune
- Coat of arms
- Location of Goudon
- Location within France Location within Occitanie
- Coordinates: 43°14′38″N 0°14′02″E
- Country: France
- Region: Occitania
- Department: Hautes-Pyrénées
- Arrondissement: Tarbes
- Canton: La Vallée de l'Arros et des Baïses
- Intercommunality: Coteaux du Val d'Arros

Government
  - Mayor (2020–2026): David Chaze
- Area^{1}: 7.53 km^{2} (2.91 sq mi)
- Elevation: 235 m (771 ft)
- Highest elevation: 410 m (1,350 ft)
- Lowest elevation: 219 m (719 ft)
- Population (2023): 250
  - Density: 33/km^{2} (86/sq mi)
- Time zone: UTC+01:00 (CET)
  - Summer (DST): UTC+02:00 (CEST)
- INSEE/Postal code: 65206 /65190
- ^{1} French Land Register data, which excludes lakes, ponds, glaciers > 1 km^{2} (0.386 sq mi or 247 acres) and river estuaries.

Goudon (French pronunciation: [ɡudɔ̃]; Occitan: Godor) is a commune in the Hautes-Pyrénées department in south-western France.

== Sport ==
The 2024 Tour Féminin des Pyrénées began at Goudon on the 14th of June.

== See also ==
- Communes of the Hautes-Pyrénées department
