= Espèche =

- Commune
- Coat of arms
- Location of Espèche
- Location within France Location within Occitanie
- Coordinates: 43°03′38″N 0°17′43″E
- Country: France
- Region: Occitania
- Department: Hautes-Pyrénées
- Arrondissement: Bagnères-de-Bigorre
- Canton: La Vallée de l'Arros et des Baïses
- Intercommunality: Plateau de Lannemezan

Government
  - Mayor (2020–2026): Jean-Marc Granié
- Area^{1}: 2.67 km^{2} (1.03 sq mi)
- Elevation: 500 m (1,600 ft)
- Highest elevation: 619 m (2,031 ft)
- Lowest elevation: 392 m (1,286 ft)
- Population (2023): 42
  - Density: 16/km^{2} (41/sq mi)
- Time zone: UTC+01:00 (CET)
  - Summer (DST): UTC+02:00 (CEST)
- INSEE/Postal code: 65166 /65130
- ^{1} French Land Register data, which excludes lakes, ponds, glaciers > 1 km^{2} (0.386 sq mi or 247 acres) and river estuaries.

Espèche (French pronunciation: [ɛspɛʃ]; Occitan: Espeisha) is a commune in the Hautes-Pyrénées department in south-western France.

== See also ==
- Communes of the Hautes-Pyrénées department
