= Ozon, Hautes-Pyrénées =

Ozon
- Commune
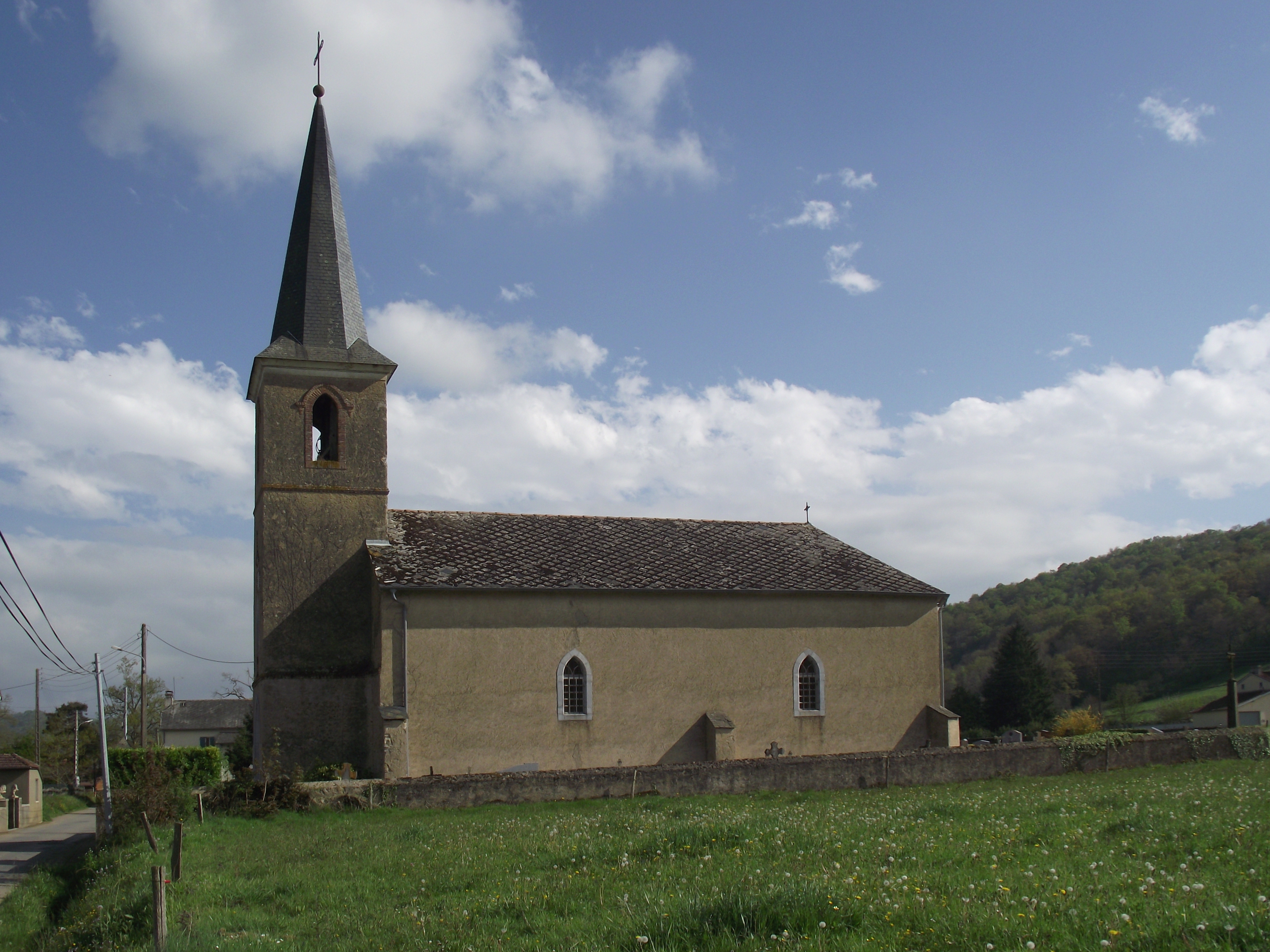
- The church of Ozon-Darré

- Coat of arms
- Location of Ozon
- Location within France Location within Occitanie
- Coordinates: 43°10′27″N 0°15′22″E
- Country: France
- Region: Occitania
- Department: Hautes-Pyrénées
- Arrondissement: Tarbes
- Canton: La Vallée de l'Arros et des Baïses
- Intercommunality: Coteaux du Val d'Arros

Government
  - Mayor (2020–2026): Michel Larré
- Area^{1}: 9.08 km^{2} (3.51 sq mi)
- Elevation: 290 m (950 ft)
- Highest elevation: 528 m (1,732 ft)
- Lowest elevation: 266 m (873 ft)
- Population (2023): 239
  - Density: 26.3/km^{2} (68.2/sq mi)
- Time zone: UTC+01:00 (CET)
  - Summer (DST): UTC+02:00 (CEST)
- INSEE/Postal code: 65353 /65190
- ^{1} French Land Register data, which excludes lakes, ponds, glaciers > 1 km^{2} (0.386 sq mi or 247 acres) and river estuaries.

Ozon (French pronunciation: [ozɔ̃]; Occitan: Audon) is a commune in the Hautes-Pyrénées department in south-western France.

== See also ==
- Communes of the Hautes-Pyrénées department
