= Sarlabous =

- Commune
- Coat of arms
- Location of Sarlabous
- Location within France Location within Occitanie
- Coordinates: 43°04′36″N 0°16′40″E
- Country: France
- Region: Occitania
- Department: Hautes-Pyrénées
- Arrondissement: Bagnères-de-Bigorre
- Canton: La Vallée de l'Arros et des Baïses
- Intercommunality: Plateau de Lannemezan
- Area^{1}: 3.39 km^{2} (1.31 sq mi)
- Elevation: 350 m (1,150 ft)
- Highest elevation: 593 m (1,946 ft)
- Lowest elevation: 344 m (1,129 ft)
- Population (2023): 79
  - Density: 23/km^{2} (60/sq mi)
- Time zone: UTC+01:00 (CET)
  - Summer (DST): UTC+02:00 (CEST)
- INSEE/Postal code: 65405 /65130
- ^{1} French Land Register data, which excludes lakes, ponds, glaciers > 1 km^{2} (0.386 sq mi or 247 acres) and river estuaries.

Sarlabous is a commune in the Hautes-Pyrénées department in south-western France.

== See also ==
- Communes of the Hautes-Pyrénées department
