= Oueilloux =

- Commune
- Coat of arms
- Location of Oueilloux
- Location within France Location within Occitanie
- Coordinates: 43°10′11″N 0°10′43″E
- Country: France
- Region: Occitania
- Department: Hautes-Pyrénées
- Arrondissement: Tarbes
- Canton: La Vallée de l'Arros et des Baïses
- Intercommunality: Coteaux du Val d'Arros

Government
  - Mayor (2020–2026): Frédéric Marque-Sans
- Area^{1}: 4.4 km^{2} (1.7 sq mi)
- Elevation: 470 m (1,540 ft)
- Highest elevation: 497 m (1,631 ft)
- Lowest elevation: 295 m (968 ft)
- Population (2023): 148
  - Density: 34/km^{2} (87/sq mi)
- Time zone: UTC+01:00 (CET)
  - Summer (DST): UTC+02:00 (CEST)
- INSEE/Postal code: 65346 /65190
- ^{1} French Land Register data, which excludes lakes, ponds, glaciers > 1 km^{2} (0.386 sq mi or 247 acres) and river estuaries.

Oueilloux (French pronunciation: [wɛju]; Occitan: Uelhons) is a commune in the Hautes-Pyrénées department in south-western France.

== See also ==
- Communes of the Hautes-Pyrénées department
