= Calavanté =

- Commune
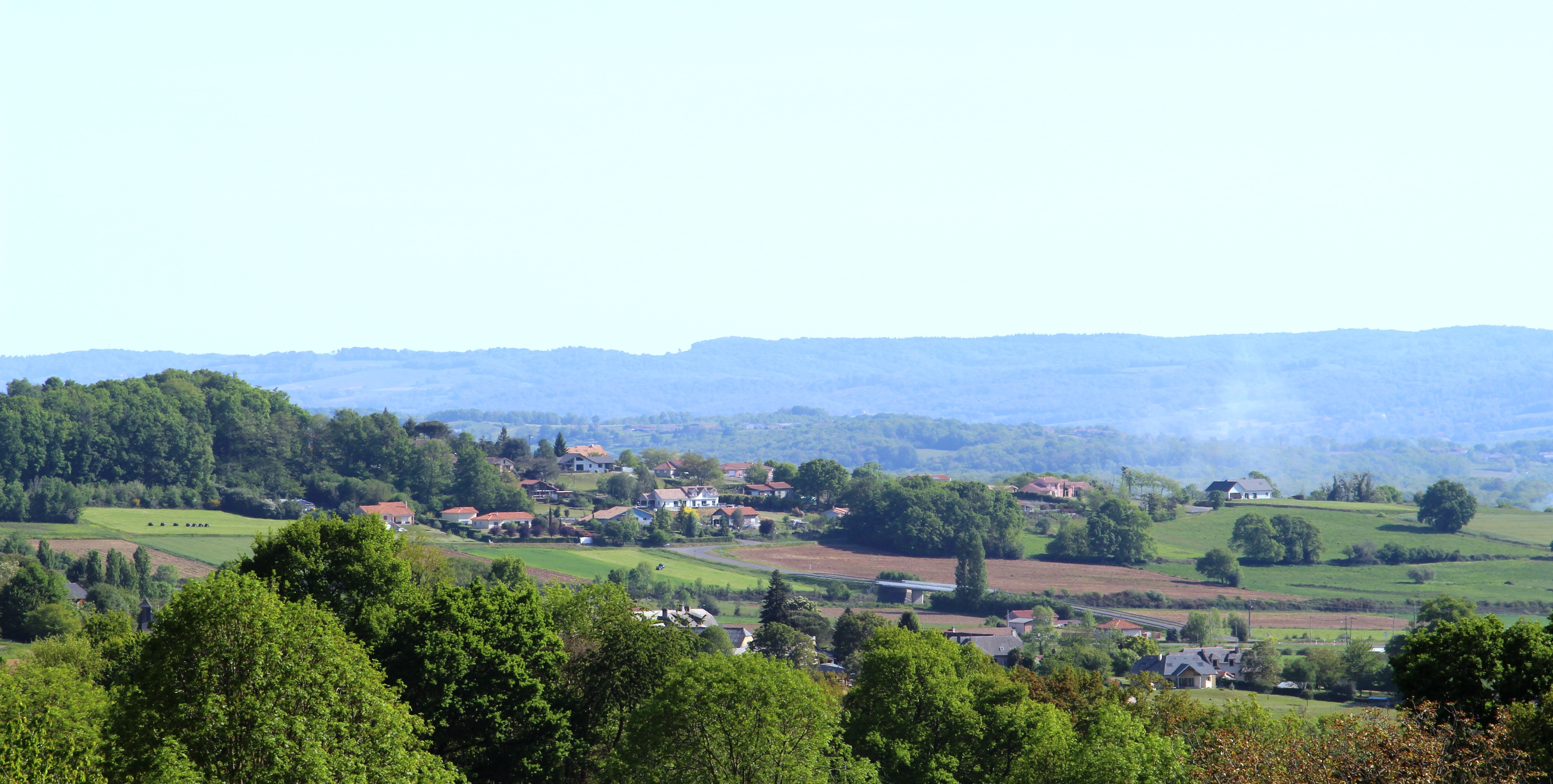
- View of Calavanté

- Coat of arms
- Location of Calavanté
- Location within France Location within Occitanie
- Coordinates: 43°12′18″N 0°09′47″E
- Country: France
- Region: Occitania
- Department: Hautes-Pyrénées
- Arrondissement: Tarbes
- Canton: La Vallée de l'Arros et des Baïses
- Intercommunality: Coteaux du Val d'Arros

Government
  - Mayor (2020–2026): Philippe Lacoume
- Area^{1}: 2.06 km^{2} (0.80 sq mi)
- Elevation: 303 m (994 ft)
- Highest elevation: 431 m (1,414 ft)
- Lowest elevation: 313 m (1,027 ft)
- Population (2023): 329
  - Density: 160/km^{2} (414/sq mi)
- Time zone: UTC+01:00 (CET)
  - Summer (DST): UTC+02:00 (CEST)
- INSEE/Postal code: 65120 /65190
- ^{1} French Land Register data, which excludes lakes, ponds, glaciers > 1 km^{2} (0.386 sq mi or 247 acres) and river estuaries.

Calavanté (French pronunciation: [kalavɑ̃te]; Occitan: Calavantèr) is a commune in the Hautes-Pyrénées department in south-western France.

== See also ==
- Communes of the Hautes-Pyrénées department
