= Péré, Hautes-Pyrénées =

Péré
- Commune
- Coat of arms
- Location of Péré
- Location within France Location within Occitanie
- Coordinates: 43°08′14″N 0°18′41″E
- Country: France
- Region: Occitania
- Department: Hautes-Pyrénées
- Arrondissement: Bagnères-de-Bigorre
- Canton: La Vallée de l'Arros et des Baïses

Government
  - Mayor (2020–2026): Charles Rodrigues
- Area^{1}: 4.71 km^{2} (1.82 sq mi)
- Elevation: 575 m (1,886 ft)
- Highest elevation: 574 m (1,883 ft)
- Lowest elevation: 332 m (1,089 ft)
- Population (2023): 61
  - Density: 13/km^{2} (34/sq mi)
- Time zone: UTC+01:00 (CET)
  - Summer (DST): UTC+02:00 (CEST)
- INSEE/Postal code: 65356 /65130
- ^{1} French Land Register data, which excludes lakes, ponds, glaciers > 1 km^{2} (0.386 sq mi or 247 acres) and river estuaries.

Péré (French pronunciation: [peʁe]; Occitan: Perèr) is a commune in the Hautes-Pyrénées department in south-western France.

== See also ==
- Communes of the Hautes-Pyrénées department
