= Bourg-de-Bigorre =

- Commune
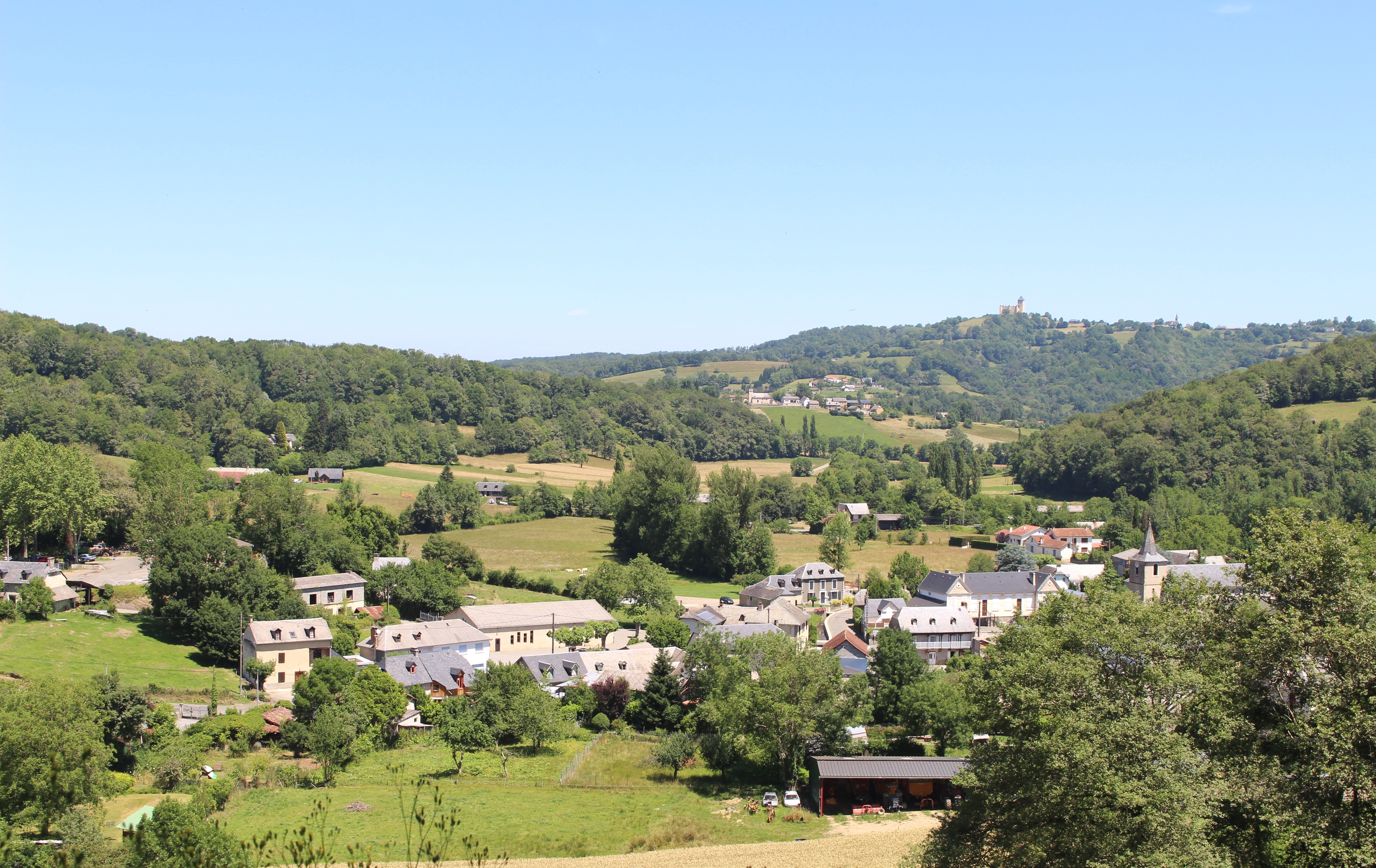
- View of Bourg-de-Bigorre

- Coat of arms
- Location of Bourg-de-Bigorre
- Location within France Location within Occitanie
- Coordinates: 43°05′29″N 0°15′40″E
- Country: France
- Region: Occitania
- Department: Hautes-Pyrénées
- Arrondissement: Bagnères-de-Bigorre
- Canton: La Vallée de l'Arros et des Baïses
- Intercommunality: Plateau de Lannemezan

Government
  - Mayor (2020–2026): Régine Sarrat
- Area^{1}: 7.92 km^{2} (3.06 sq mi)
- Elevation: 340 m (1,120 ft)
- Highest elevation: 574 m (1,883 ft)
- Lowest elevation: 331 m (1,086 ft)
- Population (2023): 194
  - Density: 24.5/km^{2} (63.4/sq mi)
- Time zone: UTC+01:00 (CET)
  - Summer (DST): UTC+02:00 (CEST)
- INSEE/Postal code: 65105 /65130
- ^{1} French Land Register data, which excludes lakes, ponds, glaciers > 1 km^{2} (0.386 sq mi or 247 acres) and river estuaries.

Bourg-de-Bigorre (French pronunciation: [buʁ də biɡɔʁ]; Occitan: Borg de Bigòrra, before 1962: Bourg) is a commune in the Hautes-Pyrénées department in southwestern France.

== Population ==
Historical population
| Year | Pop. | ±% p.a. |
|---|---|---|
| 1968 | 258 | — |
| 1975 | 231 | −1.57% |
| 1982 | 214 | −1.09% |
| 1990 | 177 | −2.34% |
| 1999 | 182 | +0.31% |
| 2007 | 209 | +1.74% |
| 2012 | 173 | −3.71% |
| 2017 | 197 | +2.63% |
| 2023 | 194 | −0.26% |
Source: INSEE

== See also ==
- Communes of the Hautes-Pyrénées department
