= Castéra-Lanusse =

- Commune
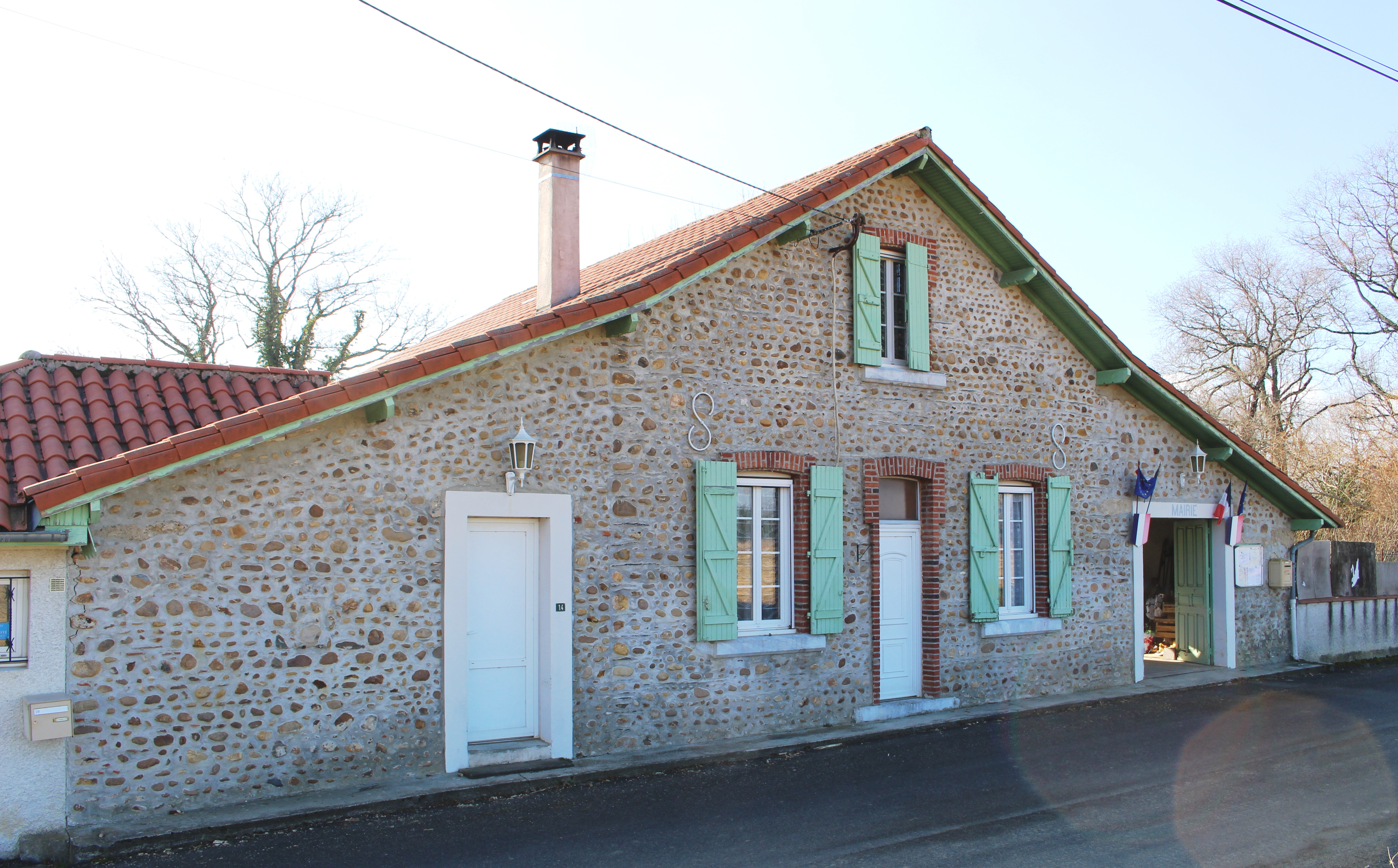
- Mairie de Castéra-Lanusse

- Coat of arms
- Location of Castéra-Lanusse
- Location within France Location within Occitanie
- Coordinates: 43°10′36″N 0°17′24″E
- Country: France
- Region: Occitania
- Department: Hautes-Pyrénées
- Arrondissement: Tarbes
- Canton: La Vallée de l'Arros et des Baïses
- Intercommunality: Coteaux du Val d'Arros

Government
  - Mayor (2020–2026): Thérèse Pourteau
- Area^{1}: 0.8 km^{2} (0.31 sq mi)
- Elevation: 456 m (1,496 ft)
- Highest elevation: 528 m (1,732 ft)
- Lowest elevation: 374 m (1,227 ft)
- Population (2023): 45
  - Density: 56/km^{2} (150/sq mi)
- Time zone: UTC+01:00 (CET)
  - Summer (DST): UTC+02:00 (CEST)
- INSEE/Postal code: 65132 /65190
- ^{1} French Land Register data, which excludes lakes, ponds, glaciers > 1 km^{2} (0.386 sq mi or 247 acres) and river estuaries.

Castéra-Lanusse (French pronunciation: [kasteʁa lanys]; Gascon: Casterar e Lanussa) is a commune in the Hautes-Pyrénées department in south-western France.

== See also ==
- Communes of the Hautes-Pyrénées department
