= Arrodets =

- Commune
- Coat of arms
- Location of Arrodets
- Location within France Location within Occitanie
- Coordinates: 43°01′52″N 0°17′03″E
- Country: France
- Region: Occitania
- Department: Hautes-Pyrénées
- Arrondissement: Bagnères-de-Bigorre
- Canton: La Vallée de l'Arros et des Baïses
- Intercommunality: CC Plateau de Lannemezan

Government
  - Mayor (2020–2026): Pascale Léonard
- Area^{1}: 0.9 km^{2} (0.35 sq mi)
- Elevation: 500 m (1,600 ft)
- Highest elevation: 702 m (2,303 ft)
- Lowest elevation: 421 m (1,381 ft)
- Population (2023): 23
  - Density: 26/km^{2} (66/sq mi)
- Time zone: UTC+01:00 (CET)
  - Summer (DST): UTC+02:00 (CEST)
- INSEE/Postal code: 65034 /65130
- ^{1} French Land Register data, which excludes lakes, ponds, glaciers > 1 km^{2} (0.386 sq mi or 247 acres) and river estuaries.

Arrodets (French pronunciation: [aʁɔdɛ]; Occitan: Eths Arrodèths) is a commune in the Hautes-Pyrénées department in southwestern France.

== Population ==
Historical population
Year	Pop.	±% p.a.
1968	46	—
1975	40	−1.98%
1982	36	−1.49%
1990	29	−2.67%
1999	19	−4.59%
2007	26	+4.00%
2012	26	+0.00%
2017	20	−5.11%
2023	23	+2.36%
Source: INSEE

== See also ==
- Communes of the Hautes-Pyrénées department
