= Lutilhous =

- Commune
- Coat of arms
- Location of Lutilhous
- Location within France Location within Occitanie
- Coordinates: 43°07′51″N 0°19′50″E
- Country: France
- Region: Occitania
- Department: Hautes-Pyrénées
- Arrondissement: Bagnères-de-Bigorre
- Canton: La Vallée de l'Arros et des Baïses
- Intercommunality: Plateau de Lannemezan

Government
  - Mayor (2020–2026): Dominique Zapparoli
- Area^{1}: 3.85 km^{2} (1.49 sq mi)
- Elevation: 573 m (1,880 ft)
- Highest elevation: 588 m (1,929 ft)
- Lowest elevation: 439 m (1,440 ft)
- Population (2023): 210
  - Density: 55/km^{2} (140/sq mi)
- Time zone: UTC+01:00 (CET)
  - Summer (DST): UTC+02:00 (CEST)
- INSEE/Postal code: 65294 /65300
- ^{1} French Land Register data, which excludes lakes, ponds, glaciers > 1 km^{2} (0.386 sq mi or 247 acres) and river estuaries.

Lutilhous is a commune in the Hautes-Pyrénées department in south-western France.

== See also ==
- Communes of the Hautes-Pyrénées department
