= Marsas =

Marsas may refer to the following places in France:

- Marsas, Gironde, a commune in the Gironde department
- Marsas, Hautes-Pyrénées, a commune in the Hautes-Pyrénées department
