= Bernadets-Dessus =

- Commune
- Coat of arms
- Location of Bernadets-Dessus
- Location within France Location within Occitanie
- Coordinates: 43°13′03″N 0°18′24″E
- Country: France
- Region: Occitania
- Department: Hautes-Pyrénées
- Arrondissement: Tarbes
- Canton: La Vallée de l'Arros et des Baïses
- Area^{1}: 7.86 km^{2} (3.03 sq mi)
- Elevation: 480 m (1,570 ft)
- Highest elevation: 505 m (1,657 ft)
- Lowest elevation: 305 m (1,001 ft)
- Population (2023): 146
  - Density: 18.6/km^{2} (48.1/sq mi)
- Time zone: UTC+01:00 (CET)
  - Summer (DST): UTC+02:00 (CEST)
- INSEE/Postal code: 65086 /65190
- ^{1} French Land Register data, which excludes lakes, ponds, glaciers > 1 km^{2} (0.386 sq mi or 247 acres) and river estuaries.

Bernadets-Dessus is a commune in the Hautes-Pyrénées department in southwestern France.

== Population ==
Historical population
Year	Pop.	±% p.a.
1968	187	—
1975	185	−0.15%
1982	173	−0.95%
1990	159	−1.05%
1999	155	−0.28%
2007	134	−1.80%
2012	150	+2.28%
2017	155	+0.66%
2023	146	−0.99%
Source: INSEE

== See also ==
- Communes of the Hautes-Pyrénées department
