= Hitte =

- Commune
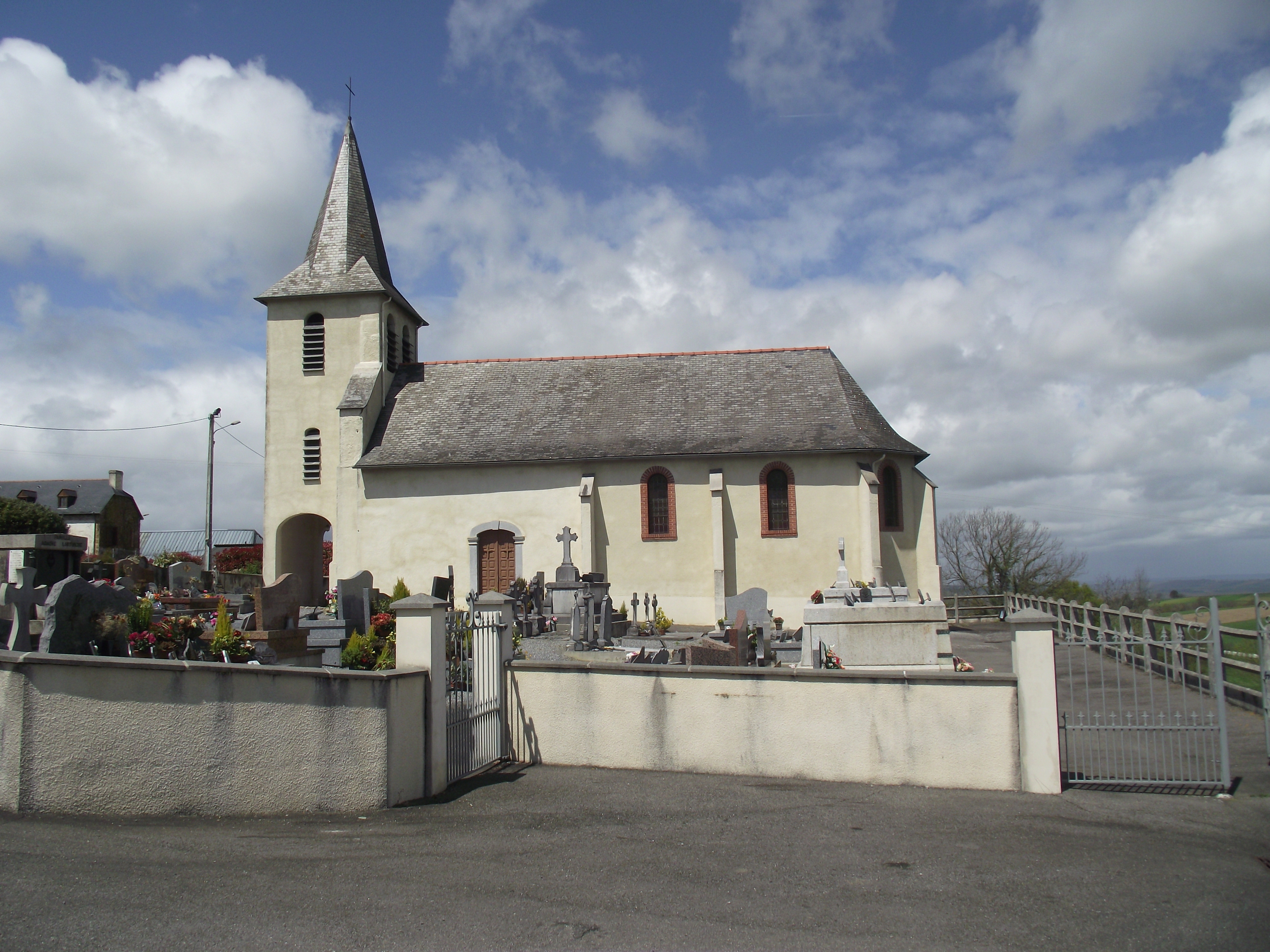
- The church

- Coat of arms
- Location of Hitte
- Location within France Location within Occitanie
- Coordinates: 43°09′03″N 0°09′55″E
- Country: France
- Region: Occitania
- Department: Hautes-Pyrénées
- Arrondissement: Tarbes
- Canton: La Vallée de l'Arros et des Baïses
- Intercommunality: Haute-Bigorre

Government
  - Mayor (2020–2026): Laurence Le Guennic
- Area^{1}: 2.91 km^{2} (1.12 sq mi)
- Elevation: 500 m (1,600 ft)
- Highest elevation: 540 m (1,770 ft)
- Lowest elevation: 360 m (1,180 ft)
- Population (2023): 133
  - Density: 45.7/km^{2} (118/sq mi)
- Time zone: UTC+01:00 (CET)
  - Summer (DST): UTC+02:00 (CEST)
- INSEE/Postal code: 65222 /65190
- ^{1} French Land Register data, which excludes lakes, ponds, glaciers > 1 km^{2} (0.386 sq mi or 247 acres) and river estuaries.

Hitte (French pronunciation: [it]; Occitan: Hita) is a commune in the Hautes-Pyrénées department in south-western France.

== See also ==
- Communes of the Hautes-Pyrénées department
