= Montastruc, Hautes-Pyrénées =

Montastruc
- Commune
- Location of Montastruc
- Location within France Location within Occitanie
- Coordinates: 43°13′08″N 0°20′39″E
- Country: France
- Region: Occitania
- Department: Hautes-Pyrénées
- Arrondissement: Bagnères-de-Bigorre
- Canton: La Vallée de l'Arros et des Baïses
- Intercommunality: Plateau de Lannemezan

Government
  - Mayor (2020–2026): Véronique Mazoué
- Area^{1}: 12.34 km^{2} (4.76 sq mi)
- Elevation: 329 m (1,079 ft)
- Highest elevation: 507 m (1,663 ft)
- Lowest elevation: 311 m (1,020 ft)
- Population (2023): 237
  - Density: 19.2/km^{2} (49.7/sq mi)
- Time zone: UTC+01:00 (CET)
  - Summer (DST): UTC+02:00 (CEST)
- INSEE/Postal code: 65318 /65330
- ^{1} French Land Register data, which excludes lakes, ponds, glaciers > 1 km^{2} (0.386 sq mi or 247 acres) and river estuaries.

Montastruc (French pronunciation: [mɔ̃tastʁyk]) is a commune in the Hautes-Pyrénées department in south-western France.

== See also ==
- Communes of the Hautes-Pyrénées department
