= Luc, Hautes-Pyrénées =

Luc
- Commune
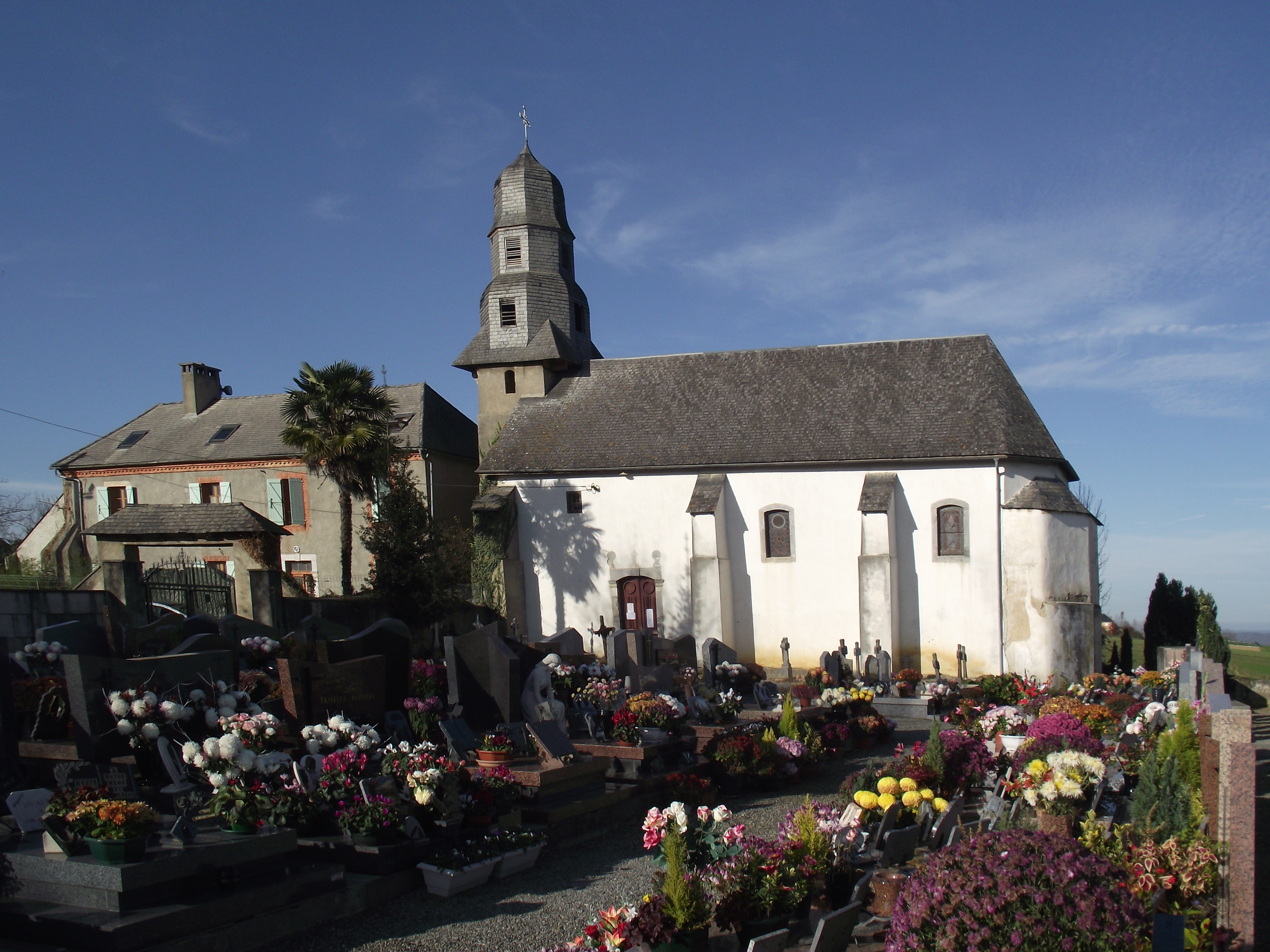
- The church of Saint-Jean-l'Évangéliste

- Coat of arms
- Location of Luc
- Location within France Location within Occitanie
- Coordinates: 43°09′12″N 0°10′40″E
- Country: France
- Region: Occitania
- Department: Hautes-Pyrénées
- Arrondissement: Tarbes
- Canton: La Vallée de l'Arros et des Baïses
- Intercommunality: Coteaux du Val d'Arros

Government
  - Mayor (2020–2026): Christian Noguès
- Area^{1}: 4.93 km^{2} (1.90 sq mi)
- Elevation: 506 m (1,660 ft)
- Highest elevation: 550 m (1,800 ft)
- Lowest elevation: 352 m (1,155 ft)
- Population (2023): 171
  - Density: 34.7/km^{2} (89.8/sq mi)
- Time zone: UTC+01:00 (CET)
  - Summer (DST): UTC+02:00 (CEST)
- INSEE/Postal code: 65290 /65190
- ^{1} French Land Register data, which excludes lakes, ponds, glaciers > 1 km^{2} (0.386 sq mi or 247 acres) and river estuaries.

Luc (French pronunciation: [lyk]) is a commune in the Hautes-Pyrénées department in south-western France.

== See also ==
- Communes of the Hautes-Pyrénées department
