= Lhez =

- Commune
- Coat of arms
- Location of Lhez
- Location within France Location within Occitanie
- Coordinates: 43°12′16″N 0°11′52″E
- Country: France
- Region: Occitania
- Department: Hautes-Pyrénées
- Arrondissement: Tarbes
- Canton: La Vallée de l'Arros et des Baïses
- Intercommunality: Coteaux du Val d'Arros

Government
  - Mayor (2020–2026): Francis Bordis
- Area^{1}: 0.8 km^{2} (0.31 sq mi)
- Elevation: 332 m (1,089 ft)
- Highest elevation: 368 m (1,207 ft)
- Lowest elevation: 269 m (883 ft)
- Population (2023): 76
  - Density: 95/km^{2} (250/sq mi)
- Time zone: UTC+01:00 (CET)
  - Summer (DST): UTC+02:00 (CEST)
- INSEE/Postal code: 65272 /65190
- ^{1} French Land Register data, which excludes lakes, ponds, glaciers > 1 km^{2} (0.386 sq mi or 247 acres) and river estuaries.

Lhez is a commune in the Hautes-Pyrénées department in south-western France.

== See also ==
- Communes of the Hautes-Pyrénées department
