= Fréchou-Fréchet =

- Commune
- Coat of arms
- Location of Fréchou-Fréchet
- Location within France Location within Occitanie
- Coordinates: 43°10′29″N 0°09′36″E
- Country: France
- Region: Occitania
- Department: Hautes-Pyrénées
- Arrondissement: Tarbes
- Canton: La Vallée de l'Arros et des Baïses
- Intercommunality: Coteaux du Val d'Arros
- Area^{1}: 2.97 km^{2} (1.15 sq mi)
- Elevation: 418 m (1,371 ft)
- Highest elevation: 507 m (1,663 ft)
- Lowest elevation: 320 m (1,050 ft)
- Population (2023): 173
  - Density: 58.2/km^{2} (151/sq mi)
- Time zone: UTC+01:00 (CET)
  - Summer (DST): UTC+02:00 (CEST)
- INSEE/Postal code: 65181 /65190
- ^{1} French Land Register data, which excludes lakes, ponds, glaciers > 1 km^{2} (0.386 sq mi or 247 acres) and river estuaries.

Fréchou-Fréchet is a commune in the Hautes-Pyrénées department in south-western France.

== See also ==
- Communes of the Hautes-Pyrénées department
