= Escots =

- Commune
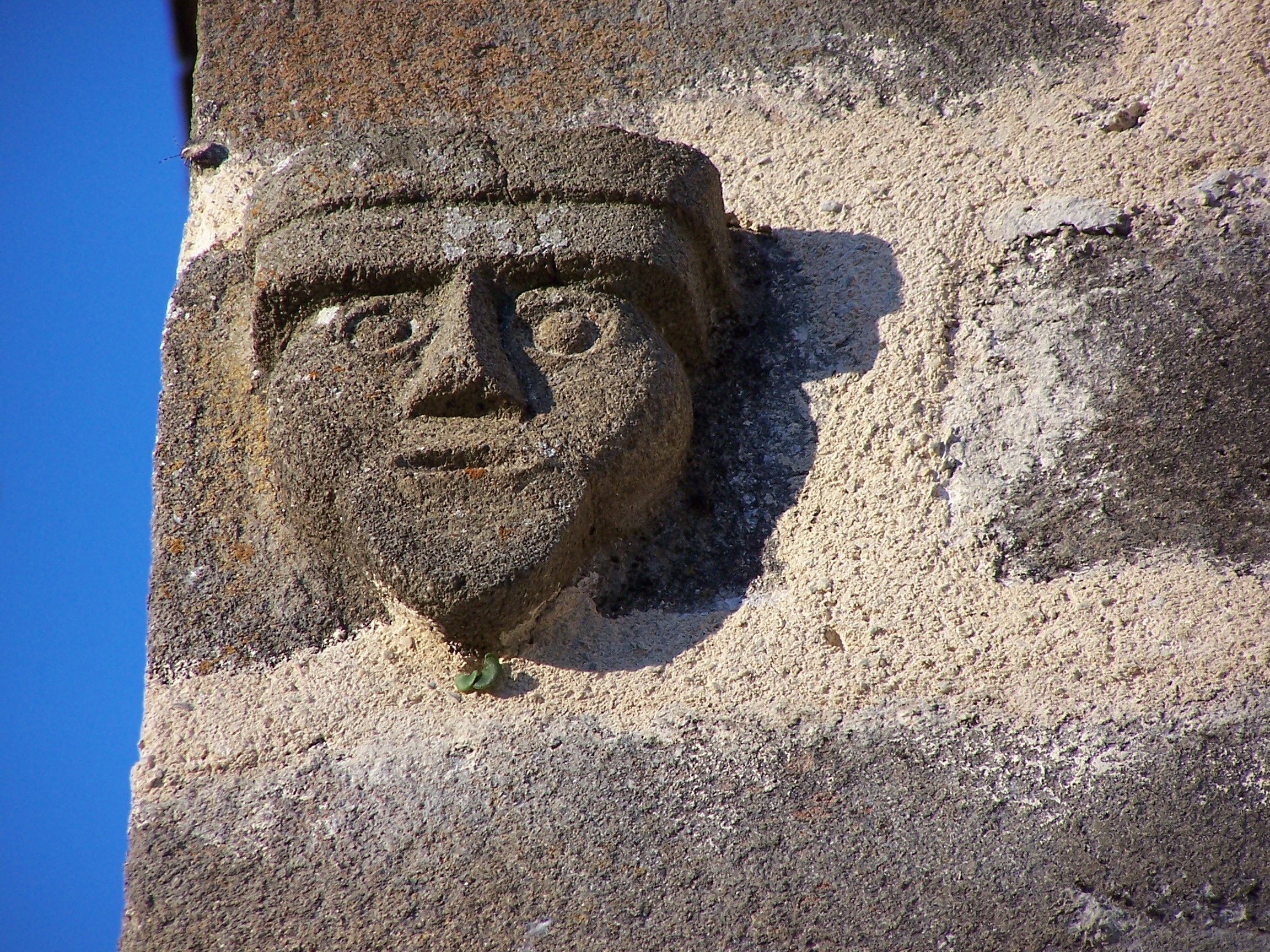
- Detail of the bell tower of the church

- Coat of arms
- Location of Escots
- Location within France Location within Occitanie
- Coordinates: 43°03′37″N 0°15′33″E
- Country: France
- Region: Occitania
- Department: Hautes-Pyrénées
- Arrondissement: Bagnères-de-Bigorre
- Canton: La Vallée de l'Arros et des Baïses
- Intercommunality: Plateau de Lannemezan

Government
  - Mayor (2020–2026): Romain Cauchois
- Area^{1}: 4.06 km^{2} (1.57 sq mi)
- Elevation: 600 m (2,000 ft)
- Highest elevation: 770 m (2,530 ft)
- Lowest elevation: 388 m (1,273 ft)
- Population (2023): 39
  - Density: 9.6/km^{2} (25/sq mi)
- Time zone: UTC+01:00 (CET)
  - Summer (DST): UTC+02:00 (CEST)
- INSEE/Postal code: 65163 /65130
- ^{1} French Land Register data, which excludes lakes, ponds, glaciers > 1 km^{2} (0.386 sq mi or 247 acres) and river estuaries.

Escots (Occitan: Escocés) is a commune in the Hautes-Pyrénées department in south-western France.

== See also ==
- Communes of the Hautes-Pyrénées department
