= El Marsa =

El Marsa may refer to:

- El Marsa, Algiers, a municipality or commune of Algiers province, Algeria
- El Marsa, Chlef, a municipality or commune of Chlef province, Algeria
- El Marsa, Skikda, a municipality or commune of Skikda province, Algeria
- El Marsa, Western Sahara, a port city of Western Sahara under Moroccan control
