= Marsas, Hautes-Pyrénées =

Marsas
- Commune
- Coat of arms
- Location of Marsas
- Location within France Location within Occitanie
- Coordinates: 43°03′10″N 0°13′37″E
- Country: France
- Region: Occitania
- Department: Hautes-Pyrénées
- Arrondissement: Bagnères-de-Bigorre
- Canton: La Vallée de l'Arros et des Baïses
- Intercommunality: CC de la Haute-Bigorre

Government
  - Mayor (2020–2026): Philippe Viau
- Area^{1}: 2.77 km^{2} (1.07 sq mi)
- Elevation: 400 m (1,300 ft)
- Highest elevation: 840 m (2,760 ft)
- Lowest elevation: 454 m (1,490 ft)
- Population (2023): 64
  - Density: 23/km^{2} (60/sq mi)
- Time zone: UTC+01:00 (CET)
  - Summer (DST): UTC+02:00 (CEST)
- INSEE/Postal code: 65300 /65200
- ^{1} French Land Register data, which excludes lakes, ponds, glaciers > 1 km^{2} (0.386 sq mi or 247 acres) and river estuaries.

Marsas is a commune in the Hautes-Pyrénées department in south-western France.

== See also ==
- Communes of the Hautes-Pyrénées department
