= Asque =

- Commune
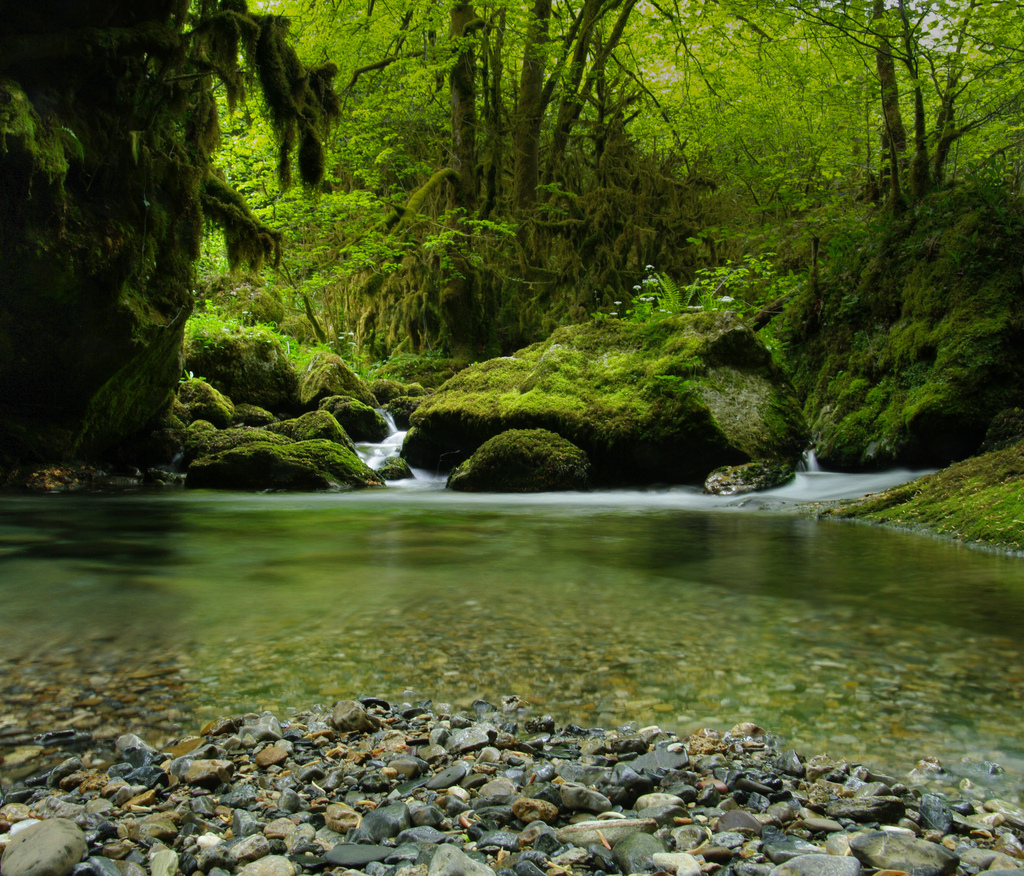
- The upper part of the River Arros at Asque

- Coat of arms
- Location of Asque
- Location within France Location within Occitanie
- Coordinates: 43°02′41″N 0°15′23″E
- Country: France
- Region: Occitania
- Department: Hautes-Pyrénées
- Arrondissement: Bagnères-de-Bigorre
- Canton: La Vallée de l'Arros et des Baïses
- Intercommunality: CC Plateau de Lannemezan

Government
  - Mayor (2020–2026): Roger Lacome
- Area^{1}: 15.85 km^{2} (6.12 sq mi)
- Elevation: 700 m (2,300 ft)
- Highest elevation: 1,628 m (5,341 ft)
- Lowest elevation: 433 m (1,421 ft)
- Population (2023): 123
  - Density: 7.76/km^{2} (20.1/sq mi)
- Time zone: UTC+01:00 (CET)
  - Summer (DST): UTC+02:00 (CEST)
- INSEE/Postal code: 65041 /65130
- ^{1} French Land Register data, which excludes lakes, ponds, glaciers > 1 km^{2} (0.386 sq mi or 247 acres) and river estuaries.

Asque (French pronunciation: [ask]; Occitan: Asca) is a commune in the Hautes-Pyrénées department in southwestern France.

== Population ==
Historical population
| Year | Pop. | ±% p.a. |
|---|---|---|
| 1968 | 131 | — |
| 1975 | 108 | −2.72% |
| 1982 | 118 | +1.27% |
| 1990 | 100 | −2.05% |
| 1999 | 107 | +0.75% |
| 2007 | 118 | +1.23% |
| 2012 | 116 | −0.34% |
| 2017 | 118 | +0.34% |
| 2023 | 123 | +0.69% |
Source: INSEE

== See also ==
- Communes of the Hautes-Pyrénées department
