= Argelès-Bagnères =

- Commune
- Coat of arms
- Location of Argelès-Bagnères
- Location within France Location within Occitanie
- Coordinates: 43°05′25″N 0°11′57″E
- Country: France
- Region: Occitania
- Department: Hautes-Pyrénées
- Arrondissement: Bagnères-de-Bigorre
- Canton: La Vallée de l'Arros et des Baïses
- Intercommunality: Haute-Bigorre

Government
  - Mayor (2020–2026): Daniel Manse
- Area^{1}: 2.62 km^{2} (1.01 sq mi)
- Elevation: 430 m (1,410 ft)
- Highest elevation: 567 m (1,860 ft)
- Lowest elevation: 391 m (1,283 ft)
- Population (2023): 103
  - Density: 39.3/km^{2} (102/sq mi)
- Time zone: UTC+01:00 (CET)
  - Summer (DST): UTC+02:00 (CEST)
- INSEE/Postal code: 65024 /65200
- ^{1} French Land Register data, which excludes lakes, ponds, glaciers > 1 km^{2} (0.386 sq mi or 247 acres) and river estuaries.

Argelès-Bagnères (French pronunciation: [aʁʒəlɛs baɲɛʁ]; Occitan: Argelèrs de Banhèras, before 2003: Argelès) is a commune in the Hautes-Pyrénées department in southwestern France.

== Population ==
Historical population
| Year | Pop. | ±% p.a. |
|---|---|---|
| 1968 | 100 | — |
| 1975 | 97 | −0.43% |
| 1982 | 97 | +0.00% |
| 1990 | 111 | +1.70% |
| 1999 | 135 | +2.20% |
| 2007 | 124 | −1.06% |
| 2012 | 118 | −0.99% |
| 2017 | 110 | −1.39% |
| 2023 | 103 | −1.09% |
Source: INSEE

== See also ==
- Communes of the Hautes-Pyrénées department
