= MARSA (aviation) =

In United States aviation, MARSA designates the delegation of responsibility for separation of aircraft in flight to military authorities by civilian air traffic control authorities. MARSA is an acronym for Military Authority Assumes Responsibility for Separation of Aircraft.

MARSA procedures are used when military aircraft must operate in close proximity and with close coordination. Under such conditions, it may be impractical for standard civilian air traffic controllers to ensure safe separation of the aircraft. MARSA procedures delegate the separation responsibility temporarily to the military authority operating the flights, thereby relieving ATC of the separation workload. When operations in close proximity have concluded, the designated military authority relinquishes responsibility back to ATC, and normal ATC procedures resume.

Typical applications of MARSA procedures include military formation flights and in-flight refueling operations.

MARSA operations are defined by regulatory documents and agreements between civilian and military aviation authorities. MARSA operations are initiated under specific conditions and terminated under equally specific conditions, using precisely defined steps to formally transfer responsibility to and from military authorities.

== Sources ==
- FAA, Order JO 7110.65W, Air Traffic Organization Policy Retrieved: 1 Sep 2016.

== See also ==
- Aerial refueling
- GIANT KILLER
- Wingman
