= Artiguemy =

- Commune
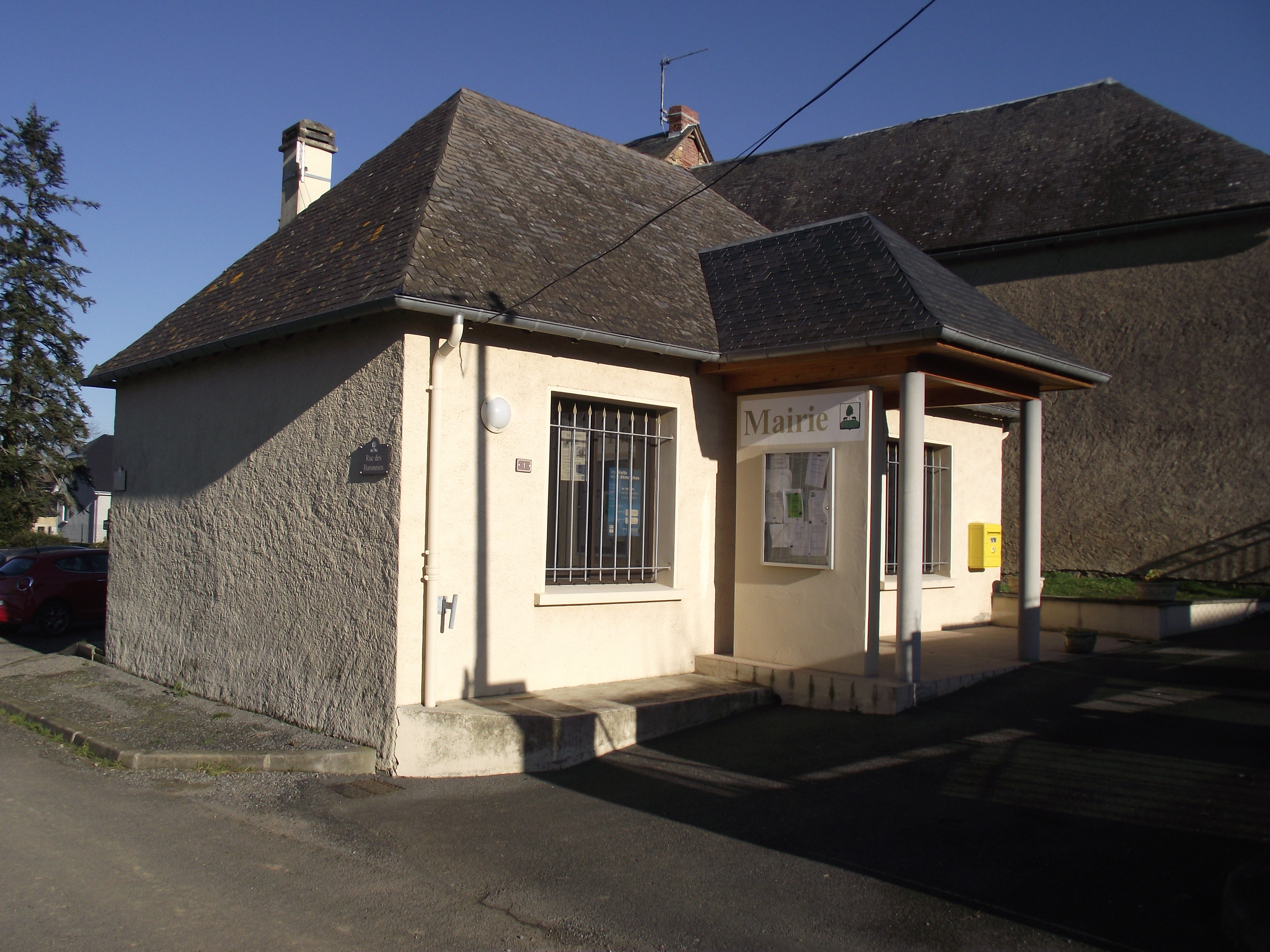
- The town hall

- Coat of arms
- Location of Artiguemy
- Location within France Location within Occitanie
- Coordinates: 43°07′40″N 0°14′50″E
- Country: France
- Region: Occitania
- Department: Hautes-Pyrénées
- Arrondissement: Bagnères-de-Bigorre
- Canton: La Vallée de l'Arros et des Baïses
- Intercommunality: CC Plateau de Lannemezan

Government
  - Mayor (2020–2026): Bruno Fourcade
- Area^{1}: 2.97 km^{2} (1.15 sq mi)
- Elevation: 484 m (1,588 ft)
- Highest elevation: 528 m (1,732 ft)
- Lowest elevation: 292 m (958 ft)
- Population (2023): 87
  - Density: 29/km^{2} (76/sq mi)
- Time zone: UTC+01:00 (CET)
  - Summer (DST): UTC+02:00 (CEST)
- INSEE/Postal code: 65037 /65130
- ^{1} French Land Register data, which excludes lakes, ponds, glaciers > 1 km^{2} (0.386 sq mi or 247 acres) and river estuaries.

Artiguemy (French pronunciation: [aʁtiɡmi]; Occitan: Artigamin) is a commune in the Hautes-Pyrénées department in southwestern France.

== Population ==
Historical population
Year	Pop.	±% p.a.
1968	92	—
1975	77	−2.51%
1982	79	+0.37%
1990	79	+0.00%
1999	89	+1.33%
2007	75	−2.12%
2012	90	+3.71%
2017	92	+0.44%
2023	87	−0.93%
Source: INSEE

== See also ==
- Communes of the Hautes-Pyrénées department
