= Neste (disambiguation) =

Neste is a Finnish oil refining company. Neste may also refer to

== Communes in south-western France ==
- Bazus-Neste
- La Barthe-de-Neste
- Mazères-de-Neste
- Saint-Laurent-de-Neste

== Other ==
- Neste (river) in France
- Van Neste, a surname
