= Montégut =

Montégut or Montegut may refer to the following people and places:

== France ==
- Montégut, Gers, a commune in the Gers department
- Montégut, Landes, a commune in the Landes department
- Montégut, Hautes-Pyrénées, a commune in the Hautes-Pyrénées department

== USA ==
- Montegut, Louisiana

== People ==
- Jean-Baptiste Joseph Émile Montégut (1825 - 1895), a French critic
- Joseph Edgard Montegut, a mayor of New Orleans (Louisiana, U.S.) during the 1840s
