= Réjaumont =

Réjaumont may refer to the following places in France:

- Réjaumont, Gers, a commune in the Gers department
- Réjaumont, Hautes-Pyrénées, a commune in the Hautes-Pyrénées department
