= Tajan, Hautes-Pyrénées =

Tajan
- Commune
- Coat of arms
- Location of Tajan
- Location within France Location within Occitanie
- Coordinates: 43°11′21″N 0°27′38″E
- Country: France
- Region: Occitania
- Department: Hautes-Pyrénées
- Arrondissement: Bagnères-de-Bigorre
- Canton: La Vallée de la Barousse
- Intercommunality: CC du Plateau de Lannemezan

Government
  - Mayor (2020–2026): André Recurt
- Area^{1}: 4.93 km^{2} (1.90 sq mi)
- Elevation: 525 m (1,722 ft)
- Highest elevation: 564 m (1,850 ft)
- Lowest elevation: 394 m (1,293 ft)
- Population (2023): 134
  - Density: 27.2/km^{2} (70.4/sq mi)
- Time zone: UTC+01:00 (CET)
  - Summer (DST): UTC+02:00 (CEST)
- INSEE/Postal code: 65437 /65300
- ^{1} French Land Register data, which excludes lakes, ponds, glaciers > 1 km^{2} (0.386 sq mi or 247 acres) and river estuaries.

Tajan (French pronunciation: [taʒɑ̃]) is a commune in the Hautes-Pyrénées department in south-western France.

== See also ==
- Communes of the Hautes-Pyrénées department
