= Bettes =

- Commune
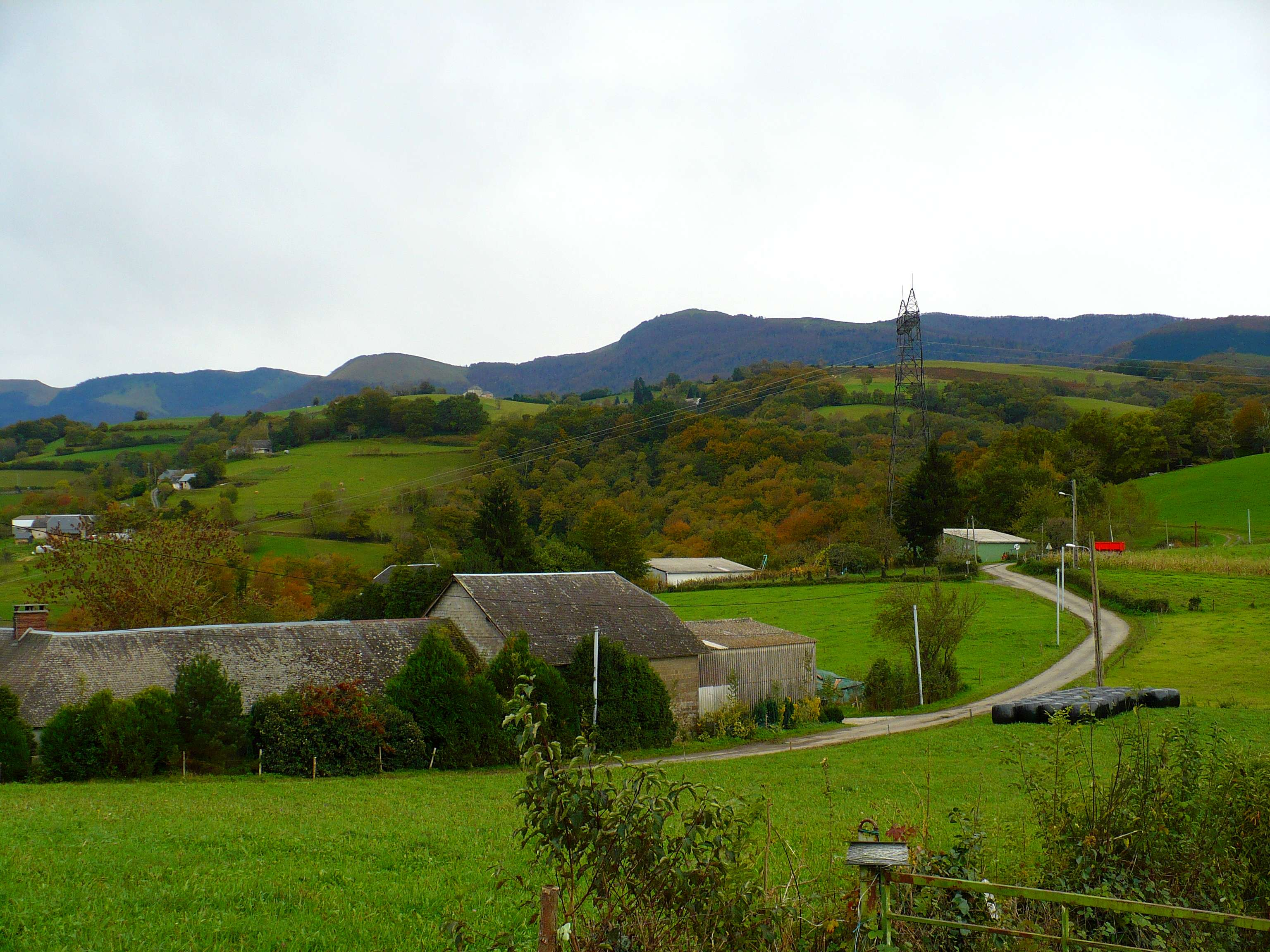
- The landscape of Bettes

- Coat of arms
- Location of Bettes
- Location within France Location within Occitanie
- Coordinates: 43°04′46″N 0°12′50″E
- Country: France
- Region: Occitania
- Department: Hautes-Pyrénées
- Arrondissement: Bagnères-de-Bigorre
- Canton: La Vallée de l'Arros et des Baïses
- Intercommunality: Haute-Bigorre

Government
  - Mayor (2020–2026): Pierre Begue
- Area^{1}: 3.38 km^{2} (1.31 sq mi)
- Elevation: 600 m (2,000 ft)
- Highest elevation: 723 m (2,372 ft)
- Lowest elevation: 395 m (1,296 ft)
- Population (2023): 60
  - Density: 18/km^{2} (46/sq mi)
- Time zone: UTC+01:00 (CET)
  - Summer (DST): UTC+02:00 (CEST)
- INSEE/Postal code: 65091 /65130
- ^{1} French Land Register data, which excludes lakes, ponds, glaciers > 1 km^{2} (0.386 sq mi or 247 acres) and river estuaries.

Bettes (French pronunciation: [bɛt]; Occitan: Bètas) is a commune in the Hautes-Pyrénées department in southwestern France.

== Population ==
Historical population
Year	Pop.	±% p.a.
1968	79	—
1975	72	−1.32%
1982	76	+0.78%
1990	66	−1.75%
1999	62	−0.69%
2007	74	+2.24%
2012	63	−3.17%
2017	51	−4.14%
2023	60	+2.75%
Source: INSEE

== See also ==
- Communes of the Hautes-Pyrénées department
