= Anères =

- Commune
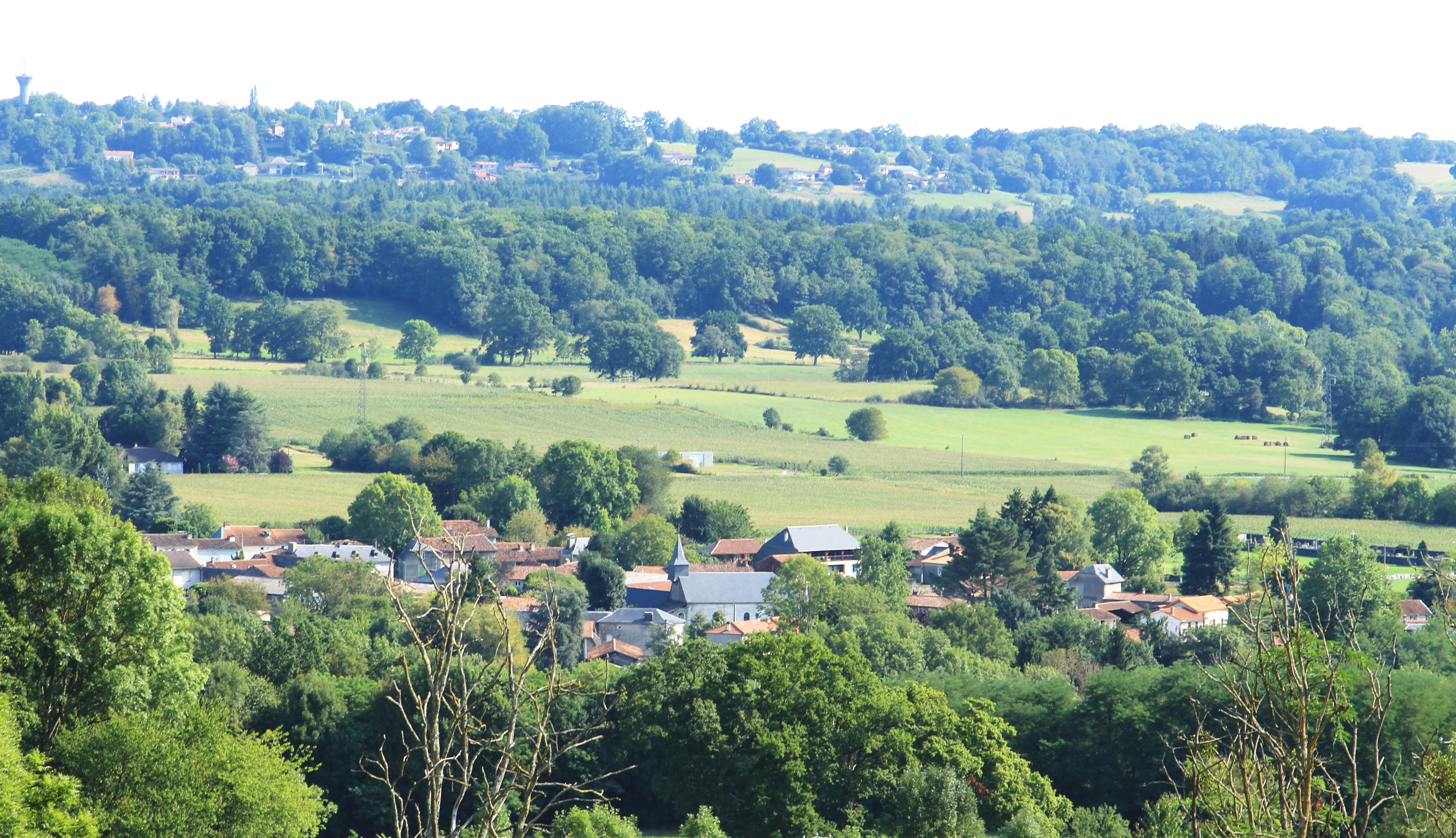

- Coat of arms
- Location of Anères
- Location within France Location within Occitanie
- Coordinates: 43°04′11″N 0°27′56″E
- Country: France
- Region: Occitania
- Department: Hautes-Pyrénées
- Arrondissement: Bagnères-de-Bigorre
- Canton: La Vallée de la Barousse
- Intercommunality: Neste Barousse

Government
  - Mayor (2020–2026): Pierre Gerwig
- Area^{1}: 2.66 km^{2} (1.03 sq mi)
- Elevation: 480 m (1,570 ft)
- Highest elevation: 536 m (1,759 ft)
- Lowest elevation: 464 m (1,522 ft)
- Population (2023): 166
  - Density: 62.4/km^{2} (162/sq mi)
- Time zone: UTC+01:00 (CET)
  - Summer (DST): UTC+02:00 (CEST)
- INSEE/Postal code: 65009 /65150
- ^{1} French Land Register data, which excludes lakes, ponds, glaciers > 1 km^{2} (0.386 sq mi or 247 acres) and river estuaries.

Anères (French pronunciation: [anɛʁ]; Occitan: Aneras) is a commune in the Hautes-Pyrénées department in southwestern France.

== Population ==
Historical population
| Year | Pop. | ±% p.a. |
|---|---|---|
| 1968 | 152 | — |
| 1975 | 159 | +0.65% |
| 1982 | 140 | −1.80% |
| 1990 | 156 | +1.36% |
| 1999 | 147 | −0.66% |
| 2007 | 181 | +2.63% |
| 2012 | 180 | −0.11% |
| 2017 | 174 | −0.68% |
| 2023 | 166 | −0.78% |
Source: INSEE

== See also ==
- Communes of the Hautes-Pyrénées department
