= Ferrère =

- Commune
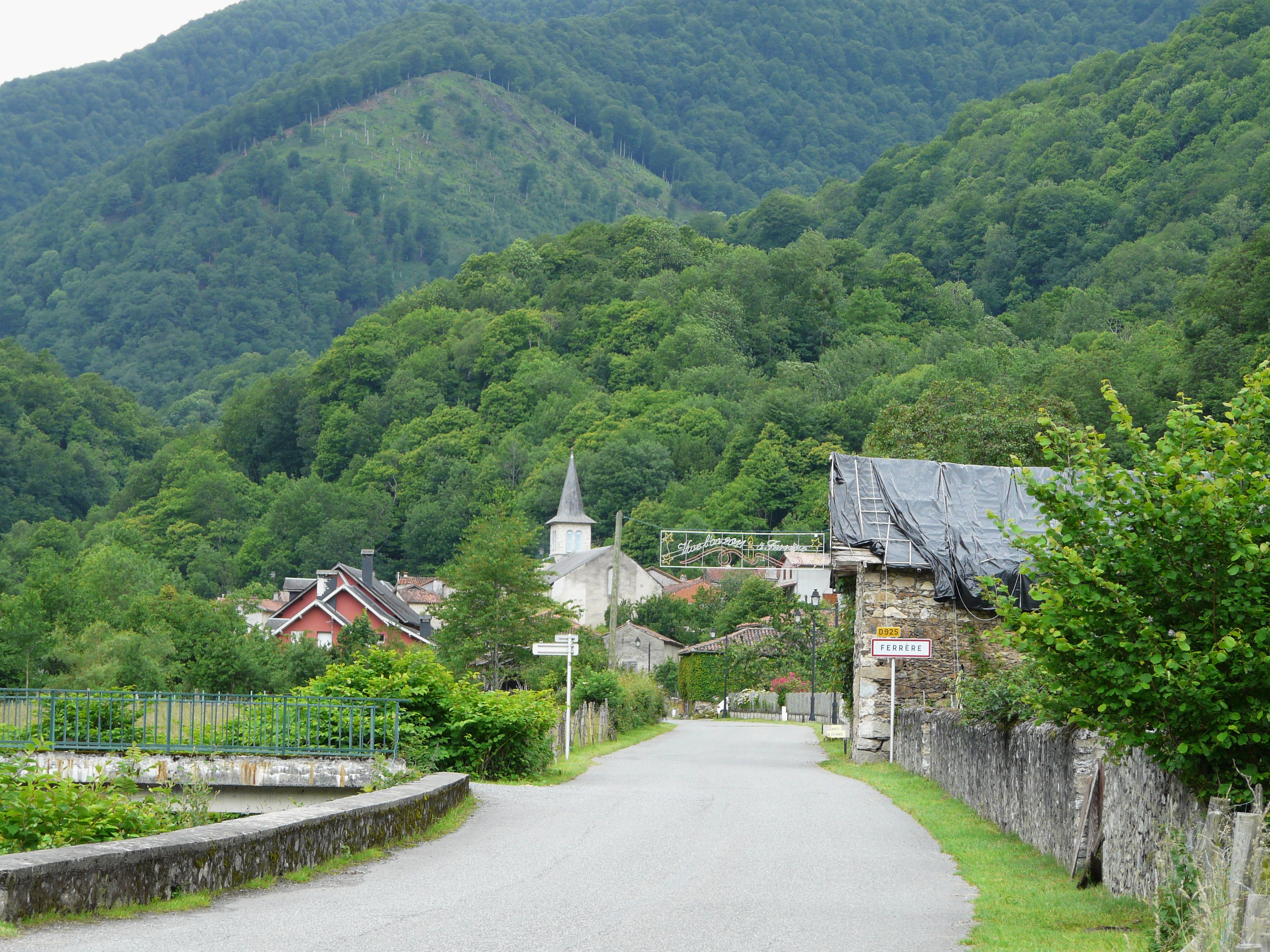
- The village of Ferrère

- Coat of arms
- Location of Ferrère
- Location within France Location within Occitanie
- Coordinates: 42°57′15″N 0°32′15″E
- Country: France
- Region: Occitania
- Department: Hautes-Pyrénées
- Arrondissement: Bagnères-de-Bigorre
- Canton: La Vallée de la Barousse
- Intercommunality: Neste Barousse

Government
  - Mayor (2020–2026): Jean-Louis Ousset
- Area^{1}: 57.56 km^{2} (22.22 sq mi)
- Elevation: 696 m (2,283 ft)
- Highest elevation: 2,122 m (6,962 ft)
- Lowest elevation: 667 m (2,188 ft)
- Population (2023): 38
  - Density: 0.66/km^{2} (1.7/sq mi)
- Time zone: UTC+01:00 (CET)
  - Summer (DST): UTC+02:00 (CEST)
- INSEE/Postal code: 65175 /65370
- ^{1} French Land Register data, which excludes lakes, ponds, glaciers > 1 km^{2} (0.386 sq mi or 247 acres) and river estuaries.

Ferrère (French pronunciation: [fɛʁɛʁ]; Occitan: Harrèra) is a commune in the Hautes-Pyrénées department in south-western France.

== See also ==
- Communes of the Hautes-Pyrénées department
