= Adervielle-Pouchergues =

- Commune
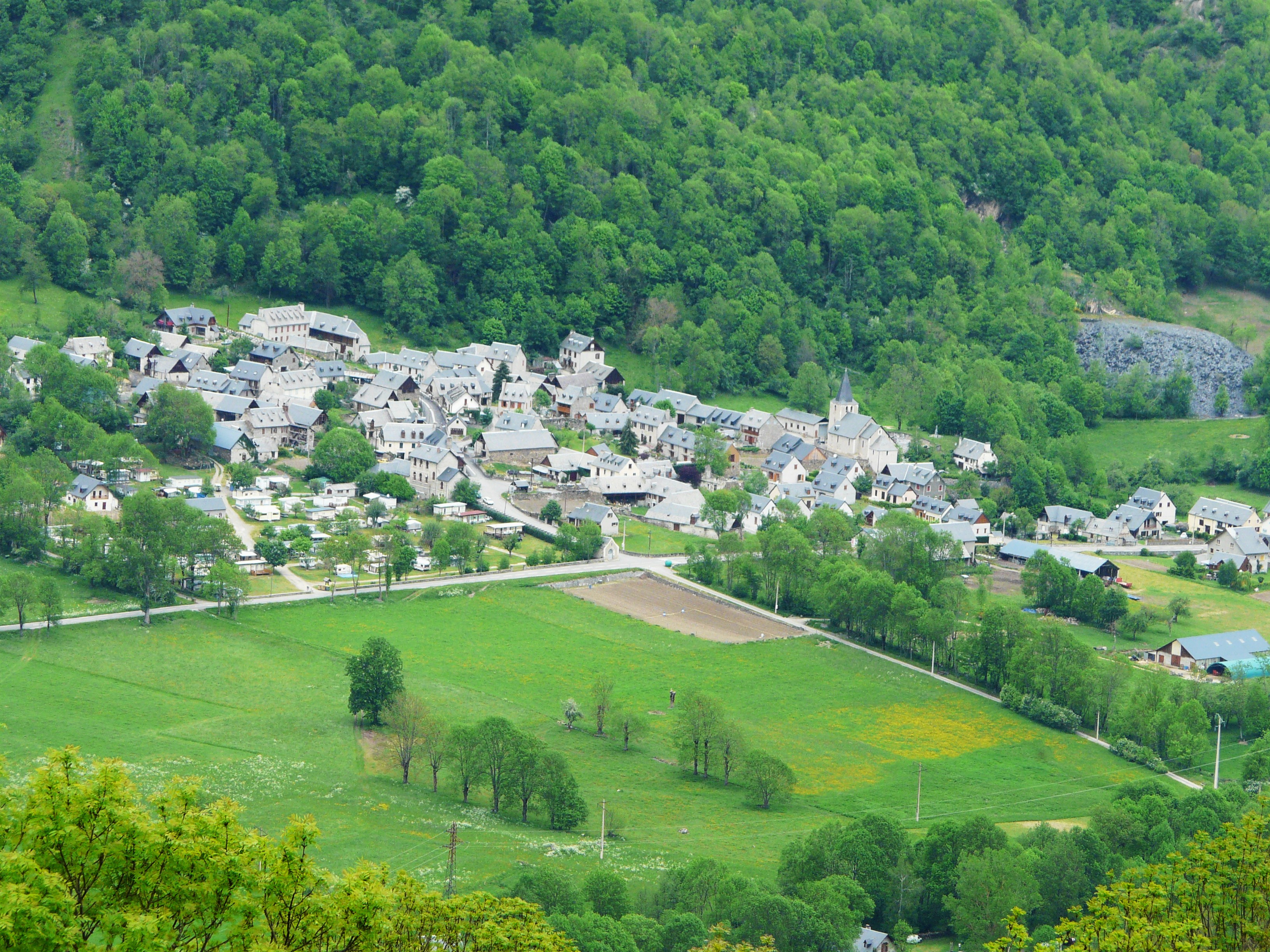
- The village of Adervielle

- Coat of arms
- Location of Adervielle-Pouchergues
- Location within France Location within Occitanie
- Coordinates: 42°49′12″N 0°24′17″E
- Country: France
- Region: Occitania
- Department: Hautes-Pyrénées
- Arrondissement: Bagnères-de-Bigorre
- Canton: Neste, Aure et Louron
- Intercommunality: Aure Louron

Government
  - Mayor (2020–2026): Matthieu Pucel
- Area^{1}: 9.14 km^{2} (3.53 sq mi)
- Elevation: 948 m (3,110 ft)
- Highest elevation: 2,326 m (7,631 ft)
- Lowest elevation: 921 m (3,022 ft)
- Population (2023): 142
  - Density: 15.5/km^{2} (40.2/sq mi)
- Time zone: UTC+01:00 (CET)
  - Summer (DST): UTC+02:00 (CEST)
- INSEE/Postal code: 65003 /65240
- ^{1} French Land Register data, which excludes lakes, ponds, glaciers > 1 km^{2} (0.386 sq mi or 247 acres) and river estuaries.

Adervielle-Pouchergues (French pronunciation: [adɛʁvjɛl puʃɛʁɡ]; Occitan: Adervièla e Pocieures) is a commune in the Hautes-Pyrénées department in southwestern France.

== Population ==
Historical population
Year	Pop.	±% p.a.
1968	88	—
1975	93	+0.79%
1982	71	−3.78%
1990	87	+2.57%
1999	80	−0.93%
2007	98	+2.57%
2012	115	+3.25%
2017	132	+2.80%
2023	142	+1.22%
Source: INSEE

== See also ==
- Communes of the Hautes-Pyrénées department
