= Saint-Paul, Hautes-Pyrénées =

Saint-Paul
- Commune
- Coat of arms
- Location of Saint-Paul
- Location within France Location within Occitanie
- Coordinates: 43°04′56″N 0°30′22″E
- Country: France
- Region: Occitania
- Department: Hautes-Pyrénées
- Arrondissement: Bagnères-de-Bigorre
- Canton: La Vallée de la Barousse
- Intercommunality: Neste Barousse

Government
  - Mayor (2020–2026): Simone Chaneau-Duffaut
- Area^{1}: 6.85 km^{2} (2.64 sq mi)
- Elevation: 495 m (1,624 ft)
- Highest elevation: 567 m (1,860 ft)
- Lowest elevation: 439 m (1,440 ft)
- Population (2023): 324
  - Density: 47.3/km^{2} (123/sq mi)
- Time zone: UTC+01:00 (CET)
  - Summer (DST): UTC+02:00 (CEST)
- INSEE/Postal code: 65394 /65150
- ^{1} French Land Register data, which excludes lakes, ponds, glaciers > 1 km^{2} (0.386 sq mi or 247 acres) and river estuaries.

Saint-Paul (French pronunciation: [sɛ̃ pɔl]; Gascon: Sent Pau de Nestés) is a commune in the Hautes-Pyrénées department in south-western France.

== See also ==
- Communes of the Hautes-Pyrénées department
