= Aveux =

- Commune
- Coat of arms
- Location of Aveux
- Location within France Location within Occitanie
- Coordinates: 43°00′37″N 0°34′18″E
- Country: France
- Region: Occitania
- Department: Hautes-Pyrénées
- Arrondissement: Bagnères-de-Bigorre
- Canton: La Vallée de la Barousse
- Intercommunality: CC Neste Barousse

Government
  - Mayor (2020–2026): Marie-Françoise Barus
- Area^{1}: 3.08 km^{2} (1.19 sq mi)
- Elevation: 587 m (1,926 ft)
- Highest elevation: 1,079 m (3,540 ft)
- Lowest elevation: 479 m (1,572 ft)
- Population (2023): 41
  - Density: 13/km^{2} (34/sq mi)
- Time zone: UTC+01:00 (CET)
  - Summer (DST): UTC+02:00 (CEST)
- INSEE/Postal code: 65053 /65370
- ^{1} French Land Register data, which excludes lakes, ponds, glaciers > 1 km^{2} (0.386 sq mi or 247 acres) and river estuaries.

Aveux (French pronunciation: [avø]; Occitan: Avèus) is a commune in the Hautes-Pyrénées department in southwestern France.

== Population ==
Historical population
Year	Pop.	±% p.a.
1968	48	—
1975	47	−0.30%
1982	54	+2.00%
1990	49	−1.21%
1999	55	+1.29%
2007	54	−0.23%
2012	51	−1.14%
2017	41	−4.27%
2023	41	+0.00%
Source: INSEE

== See also ==
- Communes of the Hautes-Pyrénées department
