= Uglas =

- Commune
- Coat of arms
- Location of Uglas
- Location within France Location within Occitanie
- Coordinates: 43°08′32″N 0°26′04″E
- Country: France
- Region: Occitania
- Department: Hautes-Pyrénées
- Arrondissement: Bagnères-de-Bigorre
- Canton: La Vallée de la Barousse

Government
  - Mayor (2020–2026): Didier Favaro
- Area^{1}: 8.54 km^{2} (3.30 sq mi)
- Elevation: 535 m (1,755 ft)
- Highest elevation: 601 m (1,972 ft)
- Lowest elevation: 454 m (1,490 ft)
- Population (2023): 274
  - Density: 32.1/km^{2} (83.1/sq mi)
- Time zone: UTC+01:00 (CET)
  - Summer (DST): UTC+02:00 (CEST)
- INSEE/Postal code: 65456 /65300
- ^{1} French Land Register data, which excludes lakes, ponds, glaciers > 1 km^{2} (0.386 sq mi or 247 acres) and river estuaries.

Uglas is a commune in the Hautes-Pyrénées department in south-western France.

== See also ==
- Communes of the Hautes-Pyrénées department
