= Seich =

- Commune
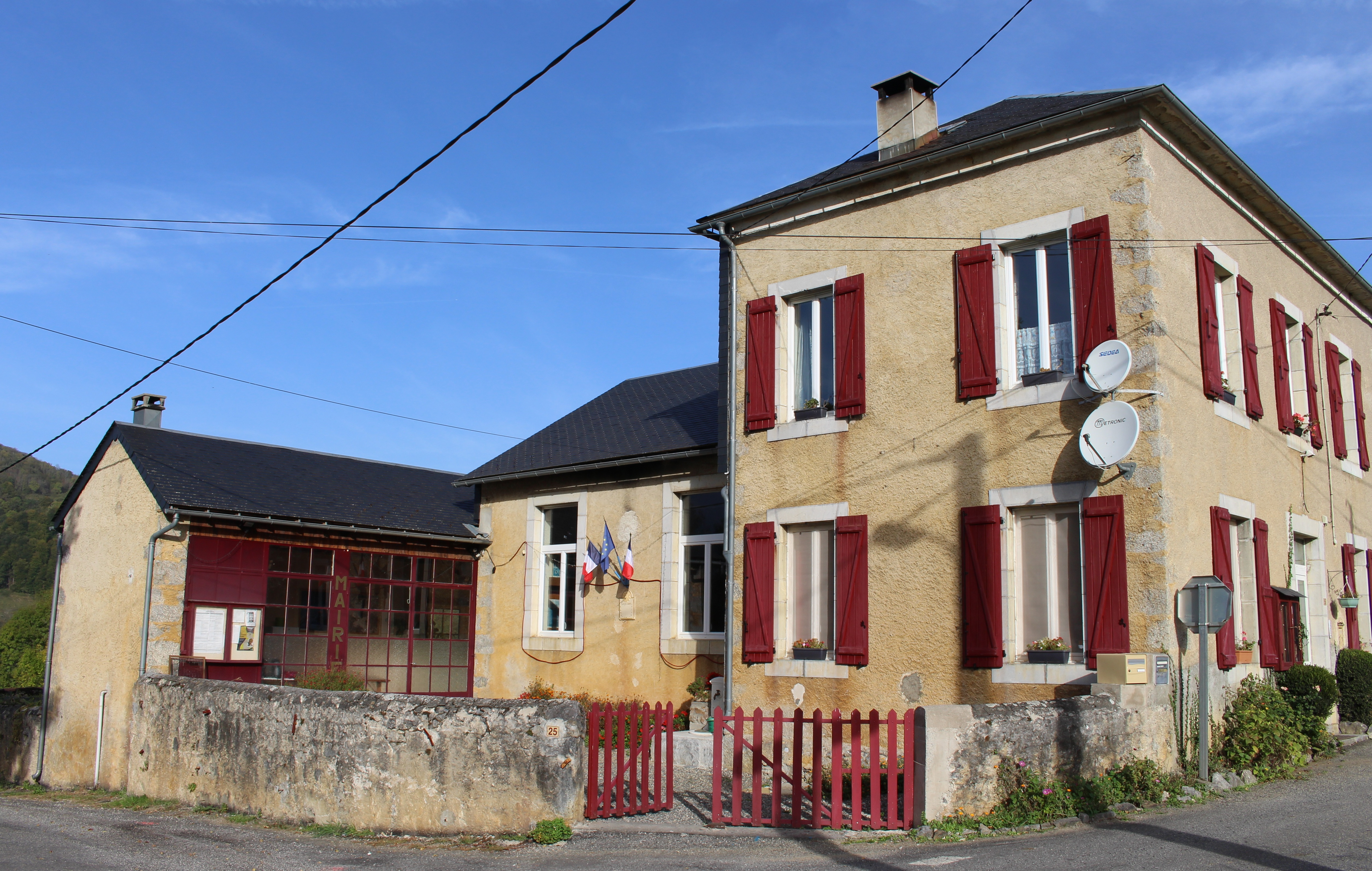
- The town hall in Seich

- Coat of arms
- Location of Seich
- Location within France Location within Occitanie
- Coordinates: 43°00′56″N 0°29′27″E
- Country: France
- Region: Occitania
- Department: Hautes-Pyrénées
- Arrondissement: Bagnères-de-Bigorre
- Canton: La Vallée de la Barousse
- Intercommunality: Neste Barousse
- Area^{1}: 7.17 km^{2} (2.77 sq mi)
- Elevation: 600 m (2,000 ft)
- Highest elevation: 1,493 m (4,898 ft)
- Lowest elevation: 512 m (1,680 ft)
- Population (2023): 89
  - Density: 12/km^{2} (32/sq mi)
- Time zone: UTC+01:00 (CET)
  - Summer (DST): UTC+02:00 (CEST)
- INSEE/Postal code: 65416 /65150
- ^{1} French Land Register data, which excludes lakes, ponds, glaciers > 1 km^{2} (0.386 sq mi or 247 acres) and river estuaries.

Seich is a commune in the Hautes-Pyrénées department in south-western France.

== See also ==
- Communes of the Hautes-Pyrénées department
