= Gaudent =

- Commune
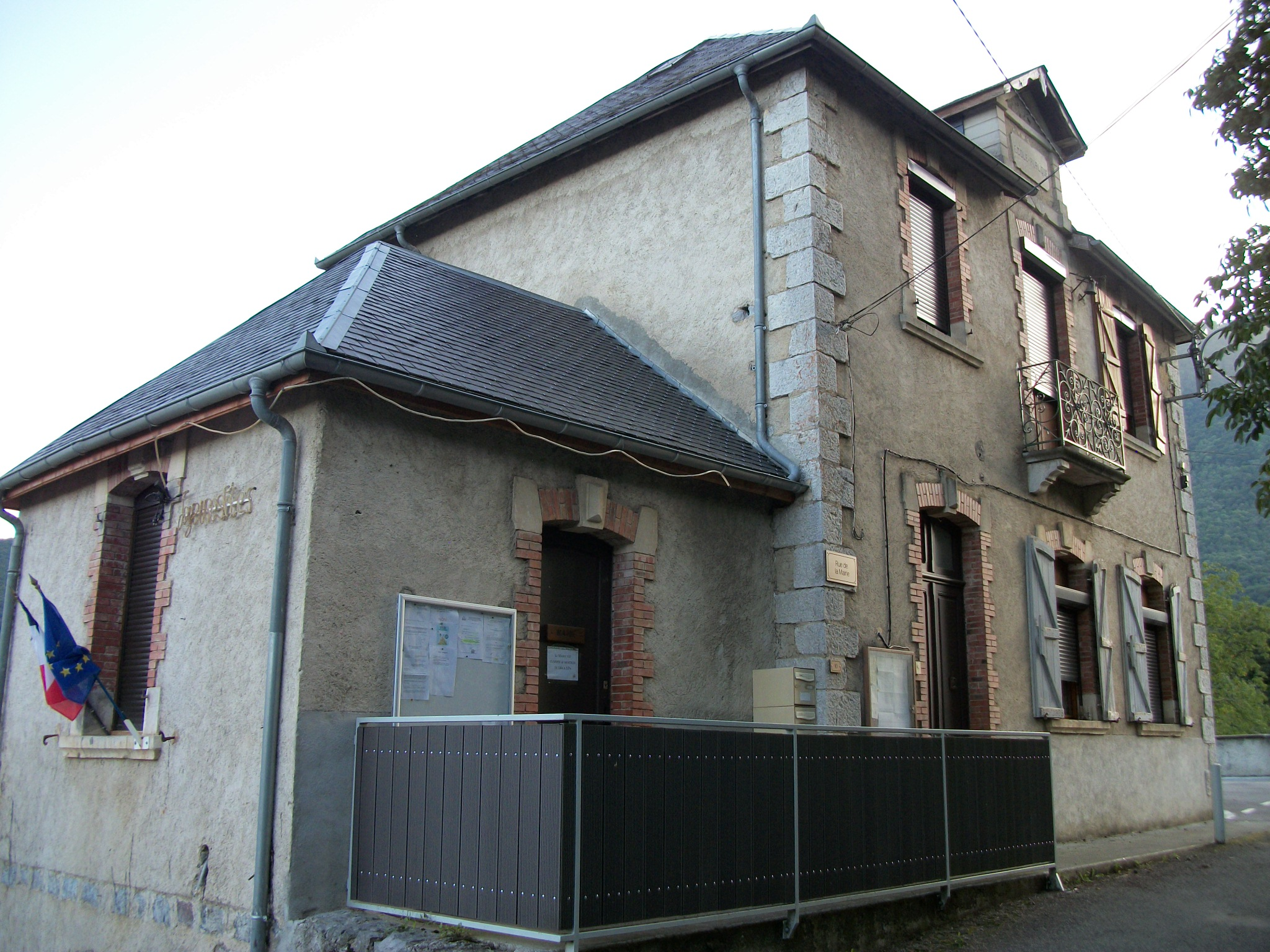
- Town hall

- Coat of arms
- Location of Gaudent
- Location within France Location within Occitanie
- Coordinates: 42°59′39″N 0°34′05″E
- Country: France
- Region: Occitania
- Department: Hautes-Pyrénées
- Arrondissement: Bagnères-de-Bigorre
- Canton: La Vallée de la Barousse
- Intercommunality: Neste Barousse

Government
  - Mayor (2020–2026): Anselme Ribes
- Area^{1}: 1.57 km^{2} (0.61 sq mi)
- Elevation: 540 m (1,770 ft)
- Highest elevation: 1,079 m (3,540 ft)
- Lowest elevation: 500 m (1,600 ft)
- Population (2023): 41
  - Density: 26/km^{2} (68/sq mi)
- Time zone: UTC+01:00 (CET)
  - Summer (DST): UTC+02:00 (CEST)
- INSEE/Postal code: 65186 /65370
- ^{1} French Land Register data, which excludes lakes, ponds, glaciers > 1 km^{2} (0.386 sq mi or 247 acres) and river estuaries.

Gaudent is a commune in the Hautes-Pyrénées department in south-western France.

== See also ==
- Communes of the Hautes-Pyrénées department
