= Communes of the Hautes-Pyrénées department =

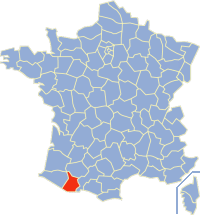

The following is a list of the 469 communes of the Hautes-Pyrénées department of France.

The communes cooperate in the following intercommunalities (as of 2025):

- Communauté d'agglomération Tarbes-Lourdes-Pyrénées
- Communauté de communes Adour Madiran (partly)
- Communauté de communes Aure Louron
- Communauté de communes des Coteaux du Val d'Arros
- Communauté de communes de la Haute-Bigorre
- Communauté de communes Neste Barousse
- Communauté de communes Pays de Nay (partly)
- Communauté de communes du Pays de Trie et du Magnoac
- Communauté de communes du Plateau de Lannemezan
- Communauté de communes Pyrénées Vallées des Gaves

INSEE code	Postal code	Commune
65001	65260	Adast
65002	65100	Adé
65003	65240	Adervielle-Pouchergues
65004	65400	Agos-Vidalos
65005	65360	Allier
65006	65440	Ancizan
65007	65390	Andrest
65009	65150	Anères
65011	65100	Les Angles
65010	65690	Angos
65012	65370	Anla
65013	65140	Ansost
65014	65370	Antichan
65015	65220	Antin
65016	65200	Antist
65017	65170	Aragnouet
65018	65560	Arbéost
65019	65360	Arcizac-Adour
65020	65100	Arcizac-ez-Angles
65021	65400	Arcizans-Avant
65022	65400	Arcizans-Dessus
65023	65240	Ardengost
65024	65200	Argelès-Bagnères
65025	65400	Argelès-Gazost
65026	65230	Aries-Espénan
65028	65670	Arné
65029	65400	Arras-en-Lavedan
65247	65100	Arrayou-Lahitte
65031	65240	Arreau
65032	65400	Arrens-Marsous
65034	65130	Arrodets
65033	65100	Arrodets-ez-Angles
65035	65500	Artagnan
65036	65400	Artalens-Souin
65037	65130	Artiguemy
65038	65100	Artigues
65039	65240	Aspin-Aure
65040	65100	Aspin-en-Lavedan
65041	65130	Asque
65042	65200	Asté
65043	65200	Astugue
65044	65350	Aubarède
65045	65400	Aucun
65046	65240	Aulon
65047	65800	Aureilhan
65048	65390	Aurensan
65049	65700	Auriébat
65050	65240	Avajan
65051	65660	Aventignan
65052	65380	Averan
65053	65370	Aveux
65054	65130	Avezac-Prat-Lahitte
65055	65400	Ayros-Arbouix
65056	65400	Ayzac-Ost
65057	65380	Azereix
65058	65170	Azet
65059	65200	Bagnères-de-Bigorre
65060	65200	Banios
65061	65140	Barbachen
65062	65690	Barbazan-Debat
65063	65360	Barbazan-Dessus
65481	65120	Barèges
65064	65240	Bareilles
65065	65100	Barlest
65066	65240	Barrancoueu
65067	65380	Barry
65068	65230	Barthe
65069	65250	La Barthe-de-Neste
65070	65100	Bartrès
65071	65130	Batsère
65072	65460	Bazet
65073	65140	Bazillac
65074	65670	Bazordan
65075	65170	Bazus-Aure
65076	65250	Bazus-Neste
65077	65400	Beaucens
65078	65710	Beaudéan
65079	65190	Bégole
65080	65380	Bénac
65081	65130	Benqué-Molère
65082	65100	Berbérust-Lias
65083	65360	Bernac-Debat
65084	65360	Bernac-Dessus
65085	65220	Bernadets-Debat
65086	65190	Bernadets-Dessus
65087	65370	Bertren
65088	65230	Betbèze
65089	65120	Betpouey
65090	65230	Betpouy
65091	65130	Bettes
65092	65410	Beyrède-Jumet-Camous
65093	65150	Bize
65094	65150	Bizous
65095	65220	Bonnefont
65096	65130	Bonnemazon
65097	65330	Bonrepos
65098	65400	Boô-Silhen
65099	65590	Bordères-Louron
65100	65320	Bordères-sur-l'Échez
65101	65190	Bordes
65102	65140	Bouilh-Devant
65103	65350	Bouilh-Péreuilh
65104	65350	Boulin
65105	65130	Bourg-de-Bigorre
65106	65170	Bourisp
65107	65100	Bourréac
65108	65460	Bours
65109	65370	Bramevaque
65110	65220	Bugard
65111	65130	Bulan
65112	65400	Bun
65113	65190	Burg
65114	65140	Buzon
65115	65350	Cabanac
65116	65240	Cadéac
65117	65170	Cadeilhan-Trachère
65118	65190	Caharet
65119	65500	Caixon
65120	65190	Calavanté
65121	65500	Camalès
65123	65710	Campan
65124	65170	Camparan
65125	65300	Campistrous
65126	65230	Campuzan
65482	65150	Cantaous
65127	65130	Capvern
65128	65330	Castelbajac
65129	65230	Castelnau-Magnoac
65130	65700	Castelnau-Rivière-Basse
65131	65350	Castelvieilh
65132	65190	Castéra-Lanusse
65133	65350	Castéra-Lou
65134	65230	Casterets
65135	65130	Castillon
65136	65230	Caubous
65137	65700	Caussade-Rivière
65138	65110	Cauterets
65139	65370	Cazarilh
65140	65590	Cazaux-Debat
65141	65240	Cazaux-Fréchet-Anéran-Camors
65142	65350	Chelle-Debat
65143	65130	Chelle-Spou
65144	65100	Cheust
65145	65120	Chèze
65146	65800	Chis
65147	65200	Cieutat
65148	65230	Cizos
65149	65190	Clarac
65150	65300	Clarens
65151	65350	Collongues
65153	65350	Coussan
65154	65370	Créchets
65155	65230	Devèze
65156	65350	Dours
65157	65170	Ens
65158	65370	Esbareich
65159	65250	Escala
65160	65500	Escaunets
65161	65140	Escondeaux
65162	65130	Esconnets
65163	65130	Escots
65164	65100	Escoubès-Pouts
65165	65130	Esparros
65166	65130	Espèche
65167	65130	Espieilh
65168	65120	Esquièze-Sère
65169	65400	Estaing
65170	65220	Estampures
65171	65240	Estarvielle
65172	65170	Estensan
65173	65120	Esterre
65174	65700	Estirac
65175	65370	Ferrère
65176	65560	Ferrières
65177	65220	Fontrailles
65178	65220	Fréchède
65179	65130	Fréchendets
65180	65240	Fréchet-Aure
65181	65190	Fréchou-Fréchet
65182	65400	Gaillagos
65183	65330	Galan
65184	65330	Galez
65185	65320	Gardères
65186	65370	Gaudent
65187	65670	Gaussan
65192	65120	Gavarnie-Gèdre
65189	65320	Gayan
65190	65250	Gazave
65191	65100	Gazost
65193	65370	Gembrie
65194	65150	Générest
65195	65240	Génos
65196	65140	Gensac
65197	65100	Ger
65198	65200	Gerde
65199	65240	Germ
65200	65200	Germs-sur-l'Oussouet
65201	65100	Geu
65202	65400	Gez
65203	65100	Gez-ez-Angles
65204	65350	Gonez
65205	65240	Gouaux
65206	65190	Goudon
65207	65130	Gourgue
65208	65170	Grailhen
65209	65240	Grézian
65210	65120	Grust
65211	65170	Guchan
65212	65240	Guchen
65213	65230	Guizerix
65214	65230	Hachan
65215	65700	Hagedet
65216	65200	Hauban
65217	65150	Hautaget
65218	65250	Hèches
65219	65700	Hères
65220	65380	Hibarette
65221	65200	Hiis
65222	65190	Hitte
65223	65310	Horgues
65224	65330	Houeydets
65225	65350	Hourc
65226	65420	Ibos
65228	65410	Ilhet
65229	65370	Ilheu
65230	65370	Izaourt
65231	65250	Izaux
65232	65350	Jacque
65233	65100	Jarret
65234	65240	Jézeau
65235	65290	Juillan
65236	65100	Julos
65237	65100	Juncalas
65238	65200	Labassère

INSEE code	Postal code	Commune
65239	65130	Labastide
65240	65700	Labatut-Rivière
65241	65130	Laborde
65242	65140	Lacassagne
65243	65700	Lafitole
65244	65320	Lagarde
65245	65300	Lagrange
65248	65700	Lahitte-Toupière
65249	65230	Lalanne
65250	65220	Lalanne-Trie
65251	65310	Laloubère
65252	65380	Lamarque-Pontacq
65253	65220	Lamarque-Rustaing
65254	65140	Laméac
65255	65240	Lançon
65256	65190	Lanespède
65257	65380	Lanne
65258	65300	Lannemezan
65259	65350	Lansac
65260	65220	Lapeyre
65261	65670	Laran
65262	65700	Larreule
65263	65230	Larroque
65264	65700	Lascazères
65265	65350	Laslades
65266	65670	Lassales
65267	65400	Lau-Balagnas
65268	65380	Layrisse
65269	65140	Lescurry
65270	65190	Lespouey
65271	65100	Lézignan
65272	65190	Lhez
65273	65140	Liac
65274	65330	Libaros
65275	65200	Lies
65276	65350	Lizos
65277	65150	Lombrès
65278	65130	Lomné
65279	65250	Lortet
65280	65100	Loubajac
65281	65200	Loucrup
65282	65510	Loudenvielle
65283	65240	Loudervielle
65284	65290	Louey
65285	65350	Louit
65286	65100	Lourdes
65287	65370	Loures-Barousse
65288	65220	Lubret-Saint-Luc
65289	65220	Luby-Betmont
65290	65190	Luc
65291	65100	Lugagnan
65292	65320	Luquet
65293	65220	Lustar
65294	65300	Lutilhous
65295	65120	Luz-Saint-Sauveur
65296	65700	Madiran
65297	65140	Mansan
65298	65350	Marquerie
65299	65500	Marsac
65300	65200	Marsas
65301	65350	Marseillan
65303	65190	Mascaras
65304	65700	Maubourguet
65305	65370	Mauléon-Barousse
65306	65130	Mauvezin
65307	65150	Mazères-de-Neste
65308	65220	Mazerolles
65309	65250	Mazouau
65310	65200	Mérilheu
65311	65140	Mingot
65313	65360	Momères
65314	65140	Monfaucon
65315	65670	Monléon-Magnoac
65316	65670	Monlong
65317	65240	Mont
65318	65330	Montastruc
65319	65150	Montégut
65320	65200	Montgaillard
65321	65690	Montignac
65322	65250	Montoussé
65323	65150	Montsérié
65324	65190	Moulédous
65325	65140	Moumoulous
65326	65350	Mun
65327	65150	Nestier
65328	65200	Neuilh
65329	65150	Nistos
65330	65500	Nouilhan
65331	65310	Odos
65332	65350	Oléac-Debat
65333	65190	Oléac-Dessus
65334	65100	Omex
65335	65200	Ordizan
65336	65230	Organ
65337	65190	Orieux
65338	65200	Orignac
65339	65380	Orincles
65340	65800	Orleix
65341	65320	Oroix
65342	65350	Osmets
65343	65100	Ossen
65344	65380	Ossun
65345	65100	Ossun-ez-Angles
65346	65190	Oueilloux
65347	65370	Ourde
65348	65100	Ourdis-Cotdoussan
65349	65100	Ourdon
65350	65490	Oursbelille
65351	65100	Ousté
65352	65400	Ouzous
65353	65190	Ozon
65354	65240	Pailhac
65355	65100	Paréac
65356	65130	Péré
65357	65190	Peyraube
65358	65230	Peyret-Saint-André
65359	65350	Peyriguère
65360	65270	Peyrouse
65361	65140	Peyrun
65362	65260	Pierrefitte-Nestalas
65363	65300	Pinas
65364	65320	Pintac
65366	65100	Poueyferré
65367	65190	Poumarous
65368	65230	Pouy
65369	65350	Pouyastruc
65370	65200	Pouzac
65371	65400	Préchac
65372	65500	Pujo
65373	65230	Puntous
65374	65220	Puydarrieux
65375	65140	Rabastens-de-Bigorre
65376	65330	Recurt
65377	65300	Réjaumont
65378	65190	Ricaud
65379	65590	Ris
65380	65350	Sabalos
65381	65330	Sabarros
65382	65370	Sacoué
65383	65220	Sadournin
65384	65170	Sailhan
65385	65250	Saint-Arroman
65386	65100	Saint-Créac
65391	65370	Sainte-Marie
65387	65700	Saint-Lanne
65388	65170	Saint-Lary-Soulan
65389	65150	Saint-Laurent-de-Neste
65390	65500	Saint-Lézer
65392	65360	Saint-Martin
65393	65400	Saint-Pastous
65394	65150	Saint-Paul
65395	65270	Saint-Pé-de-Bigorre
65396	65400	Saint-Savin
65397	65140	Saint-Sever-de-Rustan
65398	65370	Saléchan
65399	65120	Saligos
65400	65400	Salles
65401	65360	Salles-Adour
65402	65370	Samuran
65403	65500	Sanous
65404	65230	Sariac-Magnoac
65405	65130	Sarlabous
65406	65390	Sarniguet
65407	65370	Sarp
65408	65410	Sarrancolin
65409	65140	Sarriac-Bigorre
65410	65600	Sarrouilles
65411	65120	Sassis
65412	65700	Sauveterre
65413	65120	Sazos
65414	65140	Ségalas
65415	65100	Ségus
65416	65150	Seich
65417	65600	Séméac
65418	65140	Sénac
65419	65330	Sentous
65420	65400	Sère-en-Lavedan
65421	65100	Sère-Lanso
65423	65220	Sère-Rustaing
65422	65320	Séron
65424	65120	Sers
65425	65500	Siarrouy
65426	65190	Sinzos
65427	65370	Siradan
65428	65400	Sireix
65429	65700	Sombrun
65430	65350	Soréac
65431	65370	Sost
65432	65700	Soublecause
65433	65430	Soues
65435	65260	Soulom
65436	65350	Souyeaux
65437	65300	Tajan
65438	65500	Talazac
65439	65320	Tarasteix
65440	65000	Tarbes
65441	65370	Thèbe
65442	65230	Thermes-Magnoac
65443	65350	Thuy
65444	65150	Tibiran-Jaunac
65445	65130	Tilhouse
65446	65140	Tostat
65447	65190	Tournay
65448	65220	Tournous-Darré
65449	65330	Tournous-Devant
65450	65170	Tramezaïgues
65451	65200	Trébons
65452	65220	Trie-sur-Baïse
65453	65370	Troubat
65454	65140	Trouley-Labarthe
65455	65150	Tuzaguet
65456	65300	Uglas
65457	65140	Ugnouas
65458	65400	Uz
65459	65200	Uzer
65460	65500	Vic-en-Bigorre
65461	65220	Vidou
65462	65700	Vidouze
65463	65120	Viella
65464	65360	Vielle-Adour
65465	65170	Vielle-Aure
65466	65240	Vielle-Louron
65467	65400	Vier-Bordes
65468	65230	Vieuzos
65469	65120	Viey
65470	65100	Viger
65471	65170	Vignec
65472	65700	Villefranque
65473	65260	Villelongue
65474	65220	Villembits
65475	65230	Villemur
65476	65500	Villenave-près-Béarn
65477	65500	Villenave-près-Marsac
65478	65120	Viscos
65479	65200	Visker
