= Bizous =

- Commune
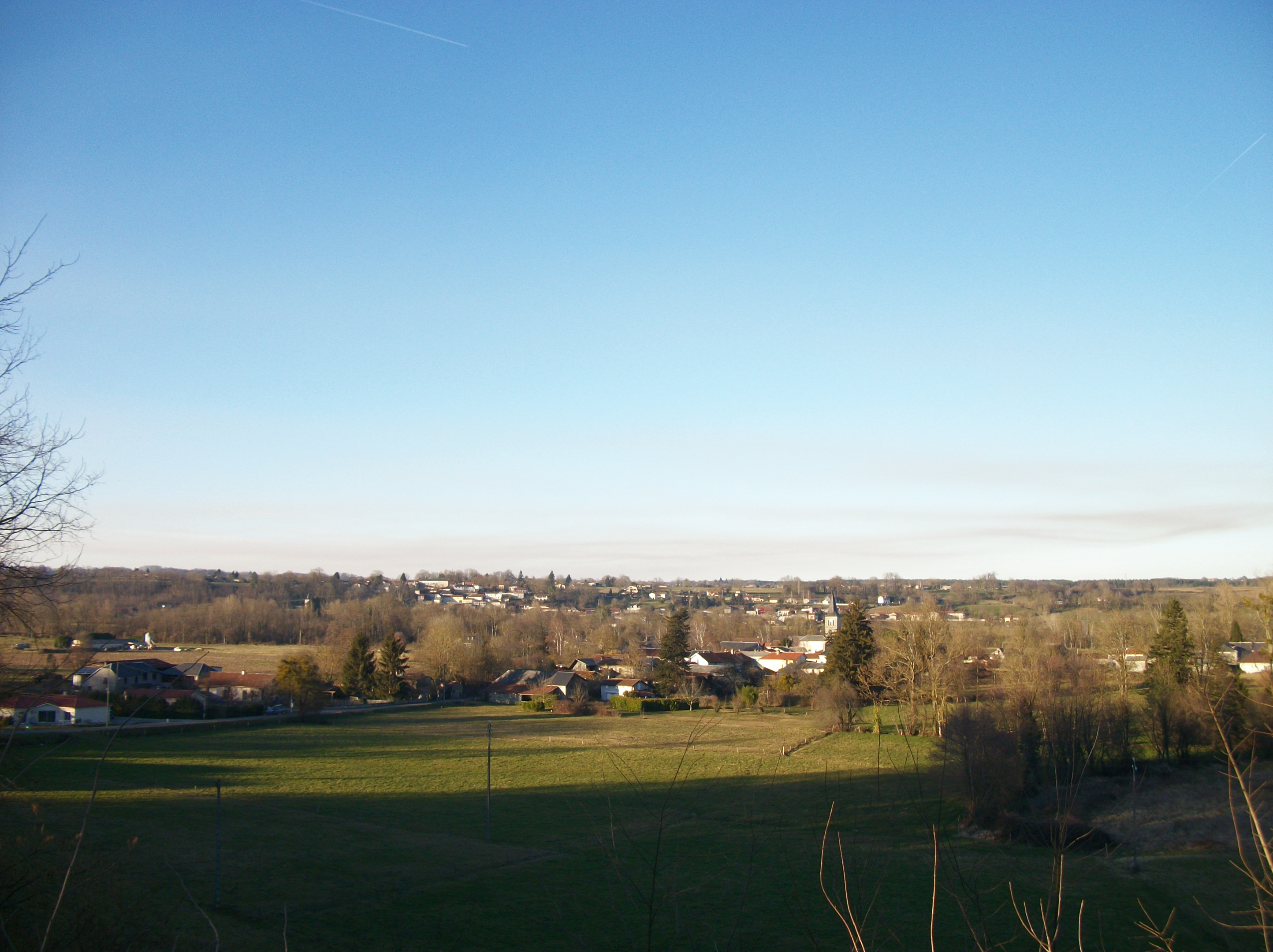
- View of Bizous village

- Coat of arms
- Location of Bizous
- Location within France Location within Occitanie
- Coordinates: 43°04′11″N 0°26′33″E
- Country: France
- Region: Occitania
- Department: Hautes-Pyrénées
- Arrondissement: Bagnères-de-Bigorre
- Canton: La Vallée de la Barousse
- Intercommunality: Neste Barousse

Government
  - Mayor (2020–2026): Béatrice Jobet
- Area^{1}: 3.18 km^{2} (1.23 sq mi)
- Elevation: 495 m (1,624 ft)
- Highest elevation: 668 m (2,192 ft)
- Lowest elevation: 479 m (1,572 ft)
- Population (2023): 127
  - Density: 39.9/km^{2} (103/sq mi)
- Time zone: UTC+01:00 (CET)
  - Summer (DST): UTC+02:00 (CEST)
- INSEE/Postal code: 65094 /65150
- ^{1} French Land Register data, which excludes lakes, ponds, glaciers > 1 km^{2} (0.386 sq mi or 247 acres) and river estuaries.

Bizous is a commune in the Hautes-Pyrénées department in southwestern France.

== Population ==
Historical population
Year	Pop.	±% p.a.
1968	139	—
1975	141	+0.20%
1982	115	−2.87%
1990	121	+0.64%
1999	96	−2.54%
2007	113	+2.06%
2012	97	−3.01%
2017	110	+2.55%
2023	127	+2.42%
Source: INSEE

== See also ==
- Communes of the Hautes-Pyrénées department
