= Bize, Hautes-Pyrénées =

Bize
- Commune
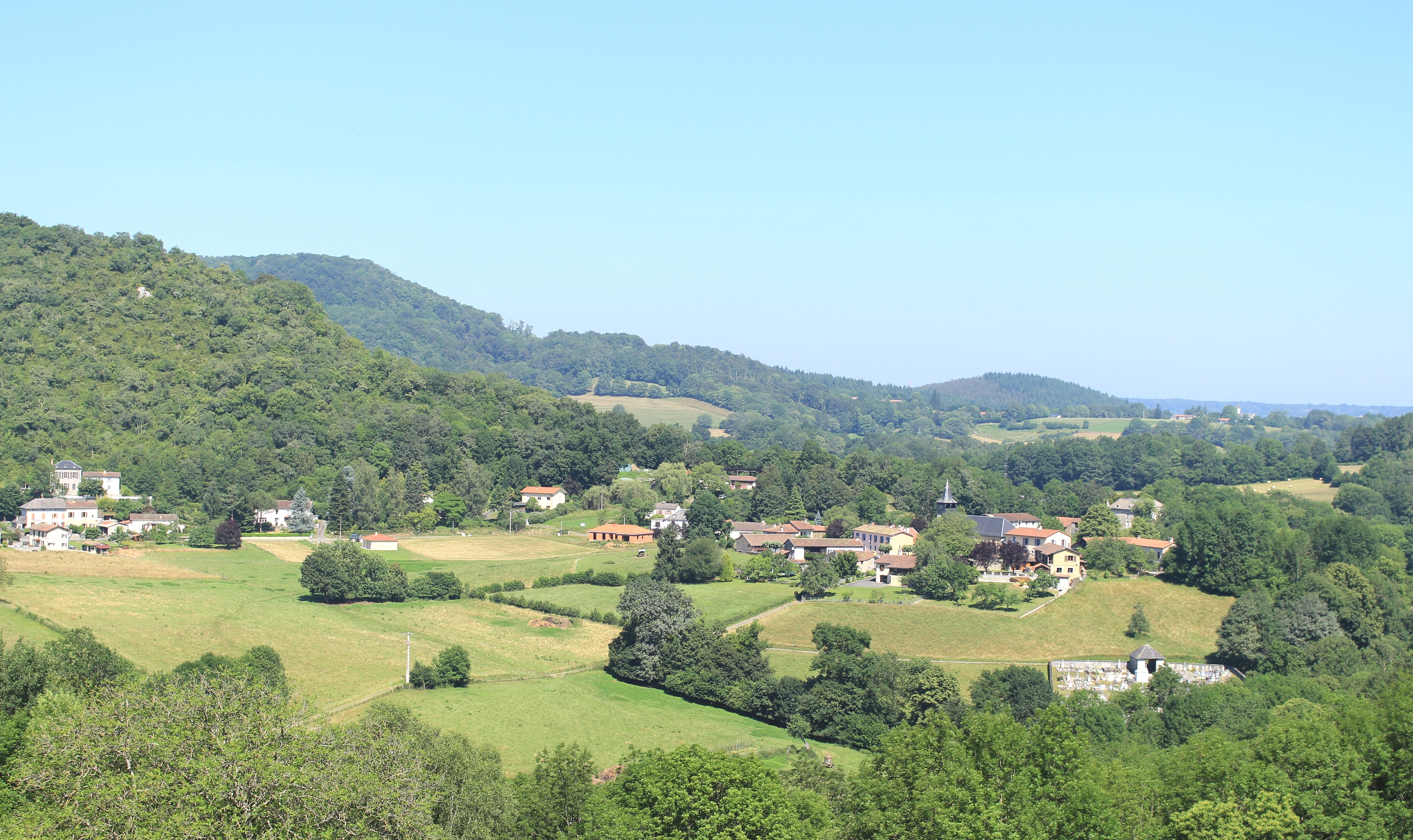
- View of Bize

- Coat of arms
- Location of Bize
- Location within France Location within Occitanie
- Coordinates: 43°02′37″N 0°28′24″E
- Country: France
- Region: Occitania
- Department: Hautes-Pyrénées
- Arrondissement: Bagnères-de-Bigorre
- Canton: La Vallée de la Barousse
- Intercommunality: Neste Barousse

Government
  - Mayor (2020–2026): Josiane Pouy
- Area^{1}: 12.96 km^{2} (5.00 sq mi)
- Elevation: 500 m (1,600 ft)
- Highest elevation: 1,124 m (3,688 ft)
- Lowest elevation: 495 m (1,624 ft)
- Population (2023): 208
  - Density: 16.0/km^{2} (41.6/sq mi)
- Time zone: UTC+01:00 (CET)
  - Summer (DST): UTC+02:00 (CEST)
- INSEE/Postal code: 65093 /65150
- ^{1} French Land Register data, which excludes lakes, ponds, glaciers > 1 km^{2} (0.386 sq mi or 247 acres) and river estuaries.

Bize (French pronunciation: [biz]; Occitan: Bisa) is a commune in the Hautes-Pyrénées department in southwestern France.

== Population ==
Historical population
| Year | Pop. | ±% p.a. |
|---|---|---|
| 1968 | 285 | — |
| 1975 | 256 | −1.52% |
| 1982 | 223 | −1.95% |
| 1990 | 210 | −0.75% |
| 1999 | 206 | −0.21% |
| 2007 | 203 | −0.18% |
| 2012 | 216 | +1.25% |
| 2017 | 215 | −0.09% |
| 2023 | 208 | −0.55% |
Source: INSEE

== See also ==
- Communes of the Hautes-Pyrénées department
