= Lombrès =

- Commune
- Coat of arms
- Location of Lombrès
- Location within France Location within Occitanie
- Coordinates: 43°03′28″N 0°30′39″E
- Country: France
- Region: Occitania
- Department: Hautes-Pyrénées
- Arrondissement: Bagnères-de-Bigorre
- Canton: La Vallée de la Barousse
- Intercommunality: Neste Barousse

Government
  - Mayor (2020–2026): Jérôme Uchan
- Area^{1}: 1.42 km^{2} (0.55 sq mi)
- Elevation: 471 m (1,545 ft)
- Highest elevation: 600 m (2,000 ft)
- Lowest elevation: 454 m (1,490 ft)
- Population (2023): 87
  - Density: 61/km^{2} (160/sq mi)
- Time zone: UTC+01:00 (CET)
  - Summer (DST): UTC+02:00 (CEST)
- INSEE/Postal code: 65277 /65150
- ^{1} French Land Register data, which excludes lakes, ponds, glaciers > 1 km^{2} (0.386 sq mi or 247 acres) and river estuaries.

Lombrès (French pronunciation: [lɔ̃bʁɛs]; Occitan: Lombrés) is a commune in the Hautes-Pyrénées department in south-western France.

== See also ==
- Communes of the Hautes-Pyrénées department
