= Canton of La Vallée de la Barousse =

Coordinates: 43.13°N 0.39°E

The canton of La Vallée de la Barousse is an administrative division of the Hautes-Pyrénées department, southwestern France. It was created at the French canton reorganisation which came into effect in March 2015. Its seat is in Lannemezan.

It consists of the following communes:

1. Anères
2. Anla
3. Antichan
4. Arné
5. Aventignan
6. Aveux
7. Bertren
8. Bize
9. Bizous
10. Bramevaque
11. Campistrous
12. Cantaous
13. Cazarilh
14. Clarens
15. Créchets
16. Esbareich
17. Ferrère
18. Gaudent
19. Gembrie
20. Générest
21. Hautaget
22. Ilheu
23. Izaourt
24. Lagrange
25. Lannemezan
26. Lombrès
27. Loures-Barousse
28. Mauléon-Barousse
29. Mazères-de-Neste
30. Montégut
31. Montsérié
32. Nestier
33. Nistos
34. Ourde
35. Pinas
36. Réjaumont
37. Sacoué
38. Sainte-Marie
39. Saint-Laurent-de-Neste
40. Saint-Paul
41. Saléchan
42. Samuran
43. Sarp
44. Seich
45. Siradan
46. Sost
47. Tajan
48. Thèbe
49. Tibiran-Jaunac
50. Troubat
51. Tuzaguet
52. Uglas
