= Nestier =

- Commune
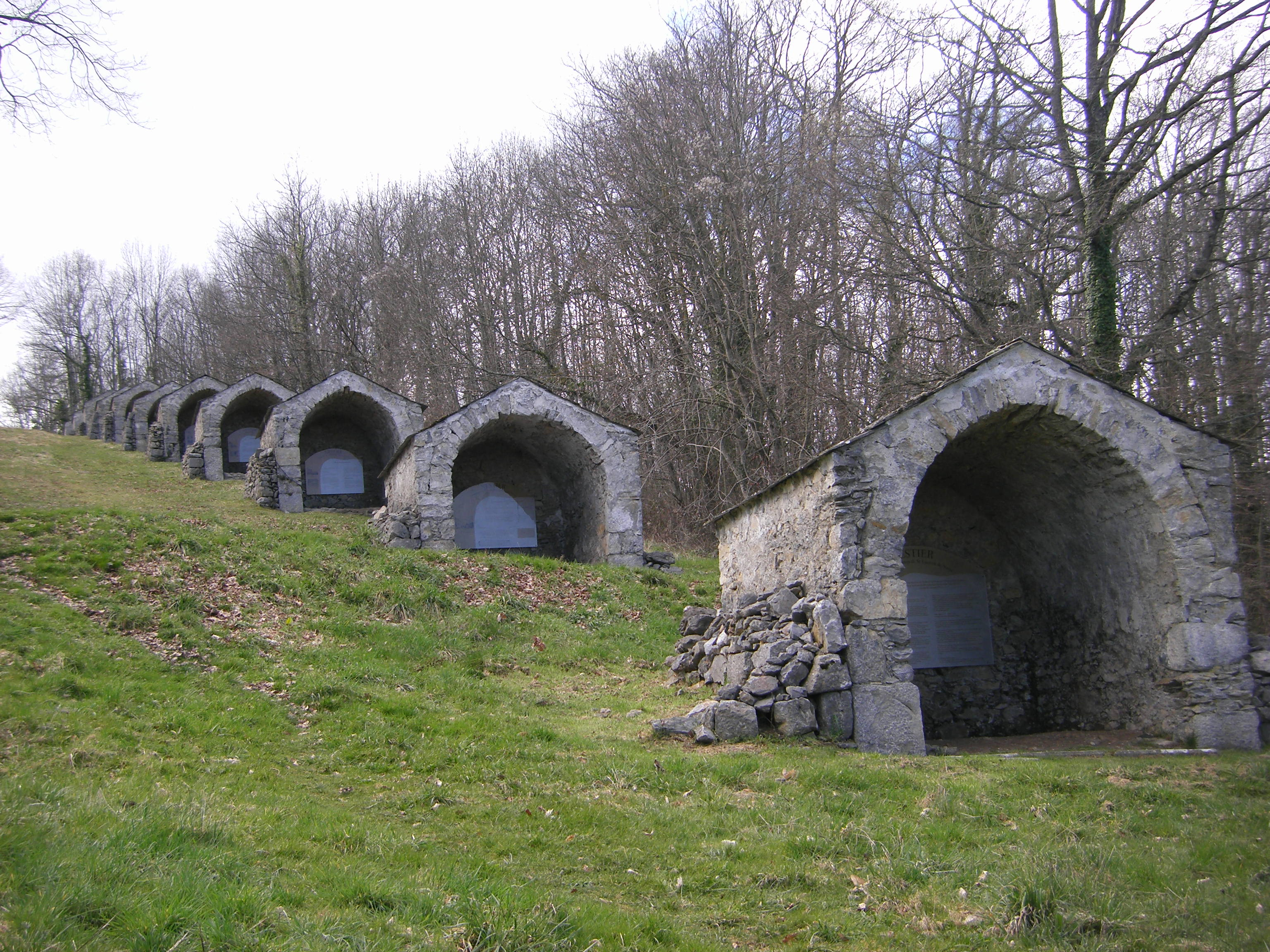
- Shrines, Mont Arès, Nestier

- Coat of arms
- Location of Nestier
- Location within France Location within Occitanie
- Coordinates: 43°03′49″N 0°28′51″E
- Country: France
- Region: Occitania
- Department: Hautes-Pyrénées
- Arrondissement: Bagnères-de-Bigorre
- Canton: La Vallée de la Barousse
- Intercommunality: Neste Barousse

Government
  - Mayor (2020–2026): Bernard Rouede
- Area^{1}: 4.94 km^{2} (1.91 sq mi)
- Elevation: 478 m (1,568 ft)
- Highest elevation: 604 m (1,982 ft)
- Lowest elevation: 458 m (1,503 ft)
- Population (2023): 206
  - Density: 41.7/km^{2} (108/sq mi)
- Time zone: UTC+01:00 (CET)
  - Summer (DST): UTC+02:00 (CEST)
- INSEE/Postal code: 65327 /65150
- ^{1} French Land Register data, which excludes lakes, ponds, glaciers > 1 km^{2} (0.386 sq mi or 247 acres) and river estuaries.

Nestier (French pronunciation: [nɛstje]; Occitan: Nestièr) is a French commune located in the department of Hautes-Pyrénées, in the region Occitanie. Historically, Nestier fell under the administration of Gascony.

Its history is marked by the following periods: the prehistory with the remains of the Neanderthal cave of the "Cap de la Bielle"; Modern era with two central characters: François de Saint-Paul and Louis de Cazaux, Lords de Nestier, the first large army officer of Louis XIV and Governor of the "Val de Aran", the second large master of the Cavalry School of Versailles and squire Cavalcadour of Louis XV; the post-revolutionary period: Nestier is then chief town of canton and sees the construction of the devotional site called "Calvaire du Mont-Arès"; the contemporary period with the reconstruction of the calvary registered with the inventory of the historical monuments and the realization of an organic swim.

Its peasant sociology has been strongly marked by the Pyrenean traditions and the lifestyles that rested essentially, until the middle of the 20th century, on a polyculture of subsistence.

In the 21st century, Nestier undergoes the deep transformations of the rural world within a new territorial reorganization.

== Geography ==
=== Climate ===
Nestier has an oceanic climate (Köppen climate classification Cfb). The average annual temperature in Nestier is 11.8 °C (53.2 °F). The average annual rainfall is 1,049.8 mm (41.33 in) with May as the wettest month. The temperatures are highest on average in July, at around 19.5 °C (67.1 °F), and lowest in January, at around 4.7 °C (40.5 °F). The highest temperature ever recorded in Nestier was 41.0 °C (105.8 °F) on 28 July 1947; the coldest temperature ever recorded was −20.0 °C (−4.0 °F) on 16 February 1956.

Climate data for Nestier (1981−2010 normals, extremes 1946−2008)
Month	Jan	Feb	Mar	Apr	May	Jun	Jul	Aug	Sep	Oct	Nov	Dec	Year
Record high °C (°F)	24.0 (75.2)	29.0 (84.2)	29.0 (84.2)	32.0 (89.6)	33.0 (91.4)	40.0 (104.0)	41.0 (105.8)	39.0 (102.2)	36.0 (96.8)	33.0 (91.4)	28.0 (82.4)	24.0 (75.2)	41.0 (105.8)
Mean daily maximum °C (°F)	9.1 (48.4)	10.4 (50.7)	13.7 (56.7)	15.5 (59.9)	19.1 (66.4)	22.5 (72.5)	25.0 (77.0)	24.9 (76.8)	22.2 (72.0)	17.8 (64.0)	12.4 (54.3)	9.8 (49.6)	16.9 (62.4)
Daily mean °C (°F)	4.7 (40.5)	5.7 (42.3)	8.4 (47.1)	10.1 (50.2)	13.8 (56.8)	17.2 (63.0)	19.5 (67.1)	19.5 (67.1)	16.6 (61.9)	12.7 (54.9)	7.9 (46.2)	5.4 (41.7)	11.8 (53.2)
Mean daily minimum °C (°F)	0.3 (32.5)	0.9 (33.6)	3.1 (37.6)	4.8 (40.6)	8.4 (47.1)	11.9 (53.4)	14.0 (57.2)	14.0 (57.2)	11.0 (51.8)	7.6 (45.7)	3.3 (37.9)	1.1 (34.0)	6.7 (44.1)
Record low °C (°F)	−18.5 (−1.3)	−20.0 (−4.0)	−12.6 (9.3)	−6.5 (20.3)	−1.5 (29.3)	0.5 (32.9)	3.0 (37.4)	2.0 (35.6)	0.0 (32.0)	−5.0 (23.0)	−10.5 (13.1)	−13.2 (8.2)	−20.0 (−4.0)
Average precipitation mm (inches)	93.2 (3.67)	75.2 (2.96)	88.8 (3.50)	104.2 (4.10)	111.9 (4.41)	72.2 (2.84)	69.2 (2.72)	79.6 (3.13)	82.2 (3.24)	81.6 (3.21)	91.9 (3.62)	99.8 (3.93)	1,049.8 (41.33)
Average precipitation days (≥ 1.0 mm)	10.4	9.7	10.4	12.3	12.4	9.2	7.6	9.2	9.0	10.1	9.7	10.4	120.4
Source: Météo-France

== See also ==
- Communes of the Hautes-Pyrénées department
