= Tuzaguet =

- Commune
- Coat of arms
- Location of Tuzaguet
- Location within France Location within Occitanie
- Coordinates: 43°04′41″N 0°26′29″E
- Country: France
- Region: Occitania
- Department: Hautes-Pyrénées
- Arrondissement: Bagnères-de-Bigorre
- Canton: La Vallée de la Barousse
- Intercommunality: Neste Barousse

Government
  - Mayor (2024–2026): Gaston Thieffry
- Area^{1}: 7.72 km^{2} (2.98 sq mi)
- Elevation: 540 m (1,770 ft)
- Highest elevation: 574 m (1,883 ft)
- Lowest elevation: 480 m (1,570 ft)
- Population (2023): 440
  - Density: 57/km^{2} (150/sq mi)
- Time zone: UTC+01:00 (CET)
  - Summer (DST): UTC+02:00 (CEST)
- INSEE/Postal code: 65455 /65150
- ^{1} French Land Register data, which excludes lakes, ponds, glaciers > 1 km^{2} (0.386 sq mi or 247 acres) and river estuaries.

Tuzaguet (French pronunciation: [tyzaɡɛ]; Occitan: Tusaguèth) is a commune in the Hautes-Pyrénées department in south-western France.

== See also ==
- Communes of the Hautes-Pyrénées department
