= Saléchan =

Administrative division in Occitanie, France

- Commune
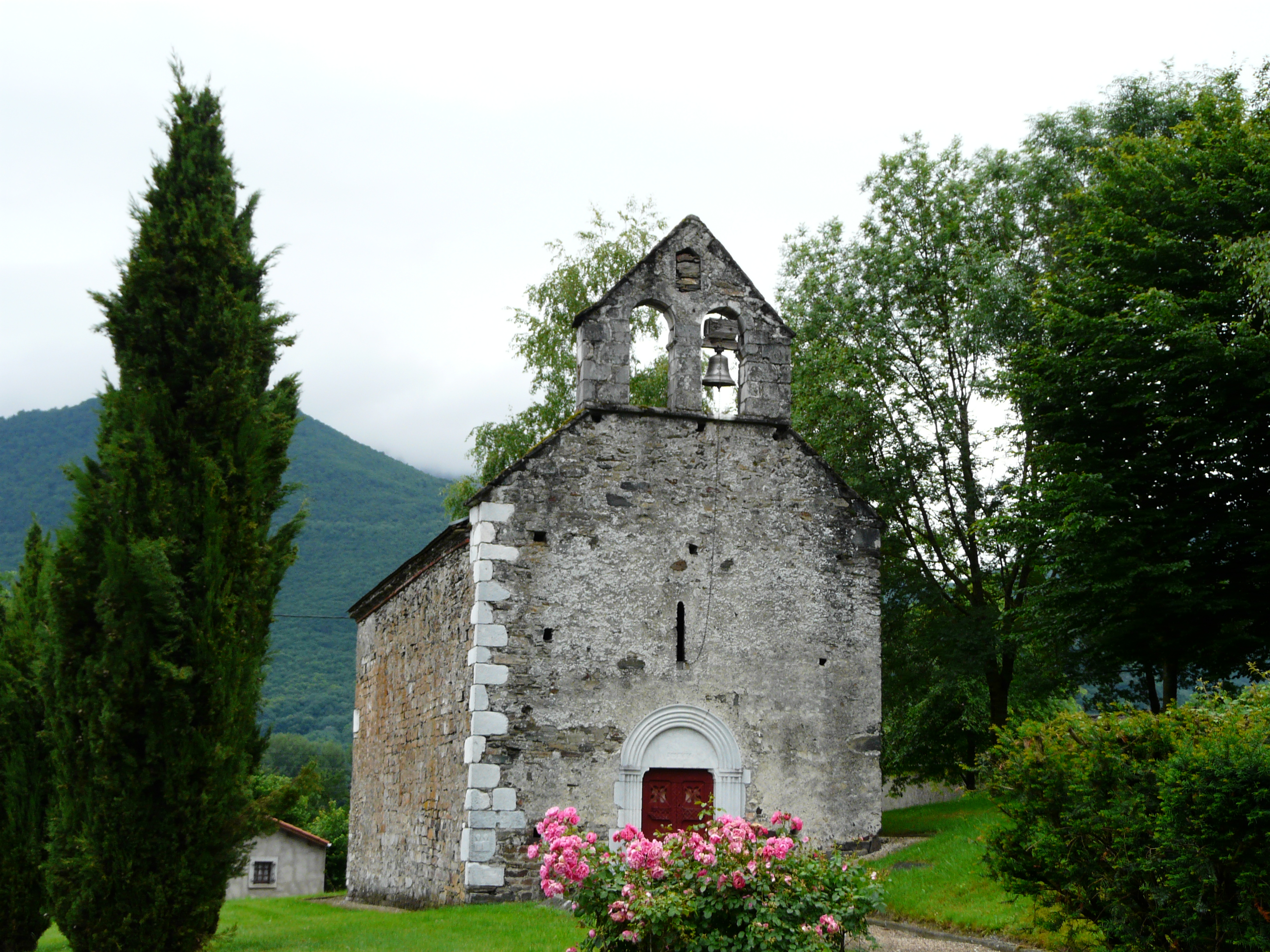
- The chapel of Saint-Julien

- Coat of arms
- Location of Saléchan
- Location within France Location within Occitanie
- Coordinates: 42°57′24″N 0°37′55″E
- Country: France
- Region: Occitania
- Department: Hautes-Pyrénées
- Arrondissement: Bagnères-de-Bigorre
- Canton: La Vallée de la Barousse
- Intercommunality: Neste Barousse

Government
  - Mayor (2020–2026): Pascal Loustau
- Area^{1}: 4.1 km^{2} (1.6 sq mi)
- Elevation: 450 m (1,480 ft)
- Highest elevation: 1,495 m (4,905 ft)
- Lowest elevation: 459 m (1,506 ft)
- Population (2023): 242
  - Density: 59/km^{2} (150/sq mi)
- Time zone: UTC+01:00 (CET)
  - Summer (DST): UTC+02:00 (CEST)
- INSEE/Postal code: 65398 /65370
- ^{1} French Land Register data, which excludes lakes, ponds, glaciers > 1 km^{2} (0.386 sq mi or 247 acres) and river estuaries.

Saléchan (French pronunciation: [saleʃɑ̃]; Occitan: Seleishan) is a commune in the Hautes-Pyrénées department in south-western France.

== See also ==
- Communes of the Hautes-Pyrénées department
