= Anla =

- Commune
- Coat of arms
- Location of Anla
- Location within France Location within Occitanie
- Coordinates: 43°00′13″N 0°34′58″E
- Country: France
- Region: Occitania
- Department: Hautes-Pyrénées
- Arrondissement: Bagnères-de-Bigorre
- Canton: La Vallée de la Barousse

Government
  - Mayor (2020–2026): Serge Picot
- Area^{1}: 2.85 km^{2} (1.10 sq mi)
- Elevation: 513 m (1,683 ft)
- Highest elevation: 746 m (2,448 ft)
- Lowest elevation: 476 m (1,562 ft)
- Population (2023): 90
  - Density: 32/km^{2} (82/sq mi)
- Time zone: UTC+01:00 (CET)
  - Summer (DST): UTC+02:00 (CEST)
- INSEE/Postal code: 65012 /65370
- ^{1} French Land Register data, which excludes lakes, ponds, glaciers > 1 km^{2} (0.386 sq mi or 247 acres) and river estuaries.

Anla (French pronunciation: [ɑ̃la]; Occitan: Anlar) is a commune in the Hautes-Pyrénées department in southwestern France.

== See also ==
- Communes of the Hautes-Pyrénées department
