= Pinas =

- Commune
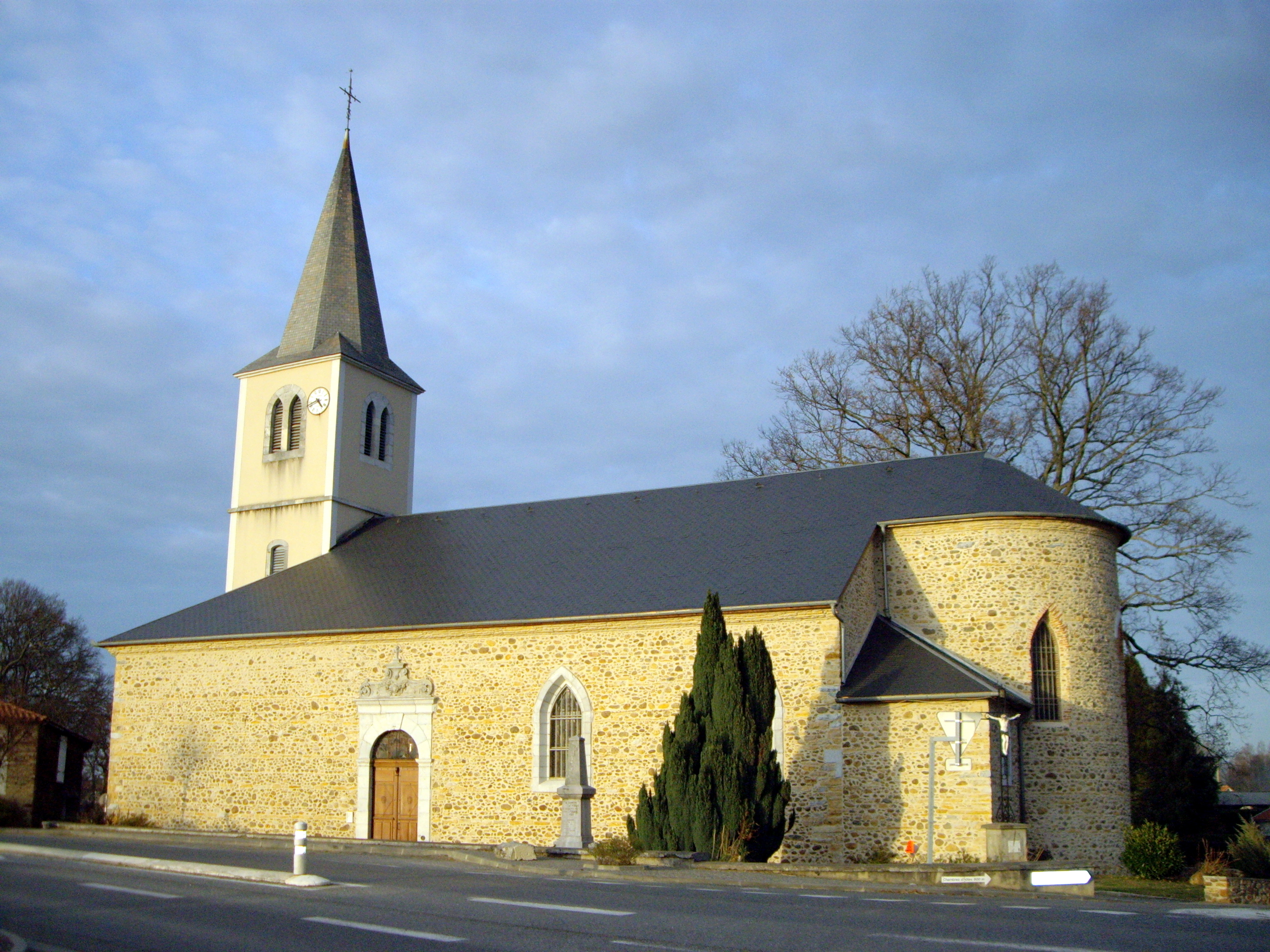
- The church of La Nativité-de-la-Sainte-Vierge

- Coat of arms
- Location of Pinas
- Location within France Location within Occitanie
- Coordinates: 43°06′58″N 0°26′12″E
- Country: France
- Region: Occitania
- Department: Hautes-Pyrénées
- Arrondissement: Bagnères-de-Bigorre
- Canton: La Vallée de la Barousse
- Intercommunality: Plateau de Lannemezan
- Area^{1}: 5.93 km^{2} (2.29 sq mi)
- Elevation: 600 m (2,000 ft)
- Highest elevation: 609 m (1,998 ft)
- Lowest elevation: 526 m (1,726 ft)
- Population (2023): 441
  - Density: 74.4/km^{2} (193/sq mi)
- Time zone: UTC+01:00 (CET)
  - Summer (DST): UTC+02:00 (CEST)
- INSEE/Postal code: 65363 /65300
- ^{1} French Land Register data, which excludes lakes, ponds, glaciers > 1 km^{2} (0.386 sq mi or 247 acres) and river estuaries.

Pinas is a commune in the Hautes-Pyrénées department in south-western France.

== See also ==
- Communes of the Hautes-Pyrénées department
