= Labassère =

- Commune
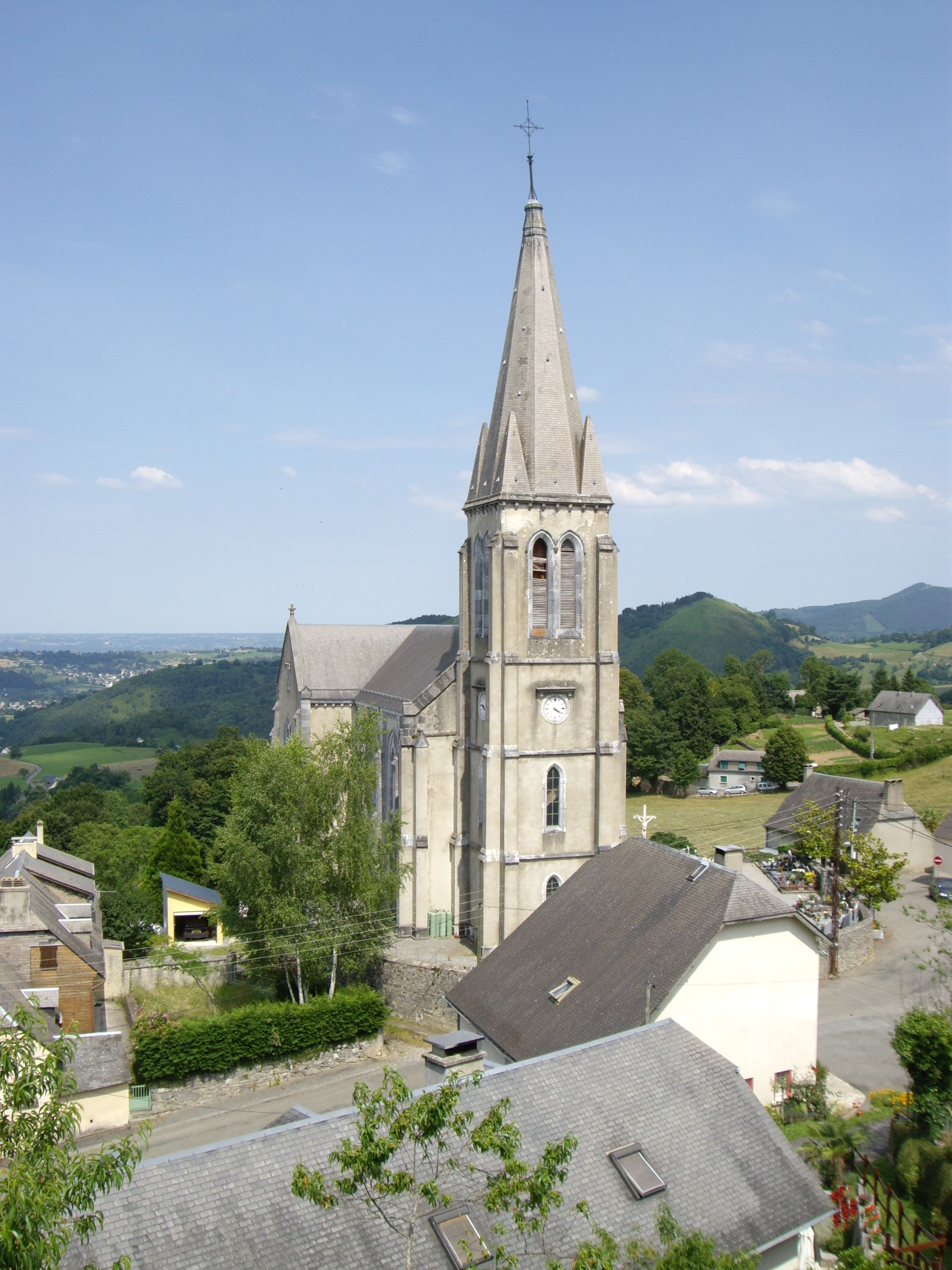
- The church of Saint-Martin

- Coat of arms
- Location of Labassère
- Location within France Location within Occitanie
- Coordinates: 43°03′34″N 0°05′50″E
- Country: France
- Region: Occitania
- Department: Hautes-Pyrénées
- Arrondissement: Bagnères-de-Bigorre
- Canton: La Haute-Bigorre
- Intercommunality: CC de la Haute-Bigorre

Government
  - Mayor (2020–2026): Jocelyne Verdoux
- Area^{1}: 10.09 km^{2} (3.90 sq mi)
- Elevation: 765 m (2,510 ft)
- Highest elevation: 1,169 m (3,835 ft)
- Lowest elevation: 546 m (1,791 ft)
- Population (2023): 227
  - Density: 22.5/km^{2} (58.3/sq mi)
- Time zone: UTC+01:00 (CET)
  - Summer (DST): UTC+02:00 (CEST)
- INSEE/Postal code: 65238 /65200
- ^{1} French Land Register data, which excludes lakes, ponds, glaciers > 1 km^{2} (0.386 sq mi or 247 acres) and river estuaries.

Labassère (French pronunciation: [labasɛʁ]; Occitan: Labassèra) is a commune in the Hautes-Pyrénées department in south-western France.

== See also ==
- Communes of the Hautes-Pyrénées department
