= Hautaget =

- Commune
- Coat of arms
- Location of Hautaget
- Location within France Location within Occitanie
- Coordinates: 43°03′23″N 0°27′25″E
- Country: France
- Region: Occitania
- Department: Hautes-Pyrénées
- Arrondissement: Bagnères-de-Bigorre
- Canton: La Vallée de la Barousse
- Intercommunality: Neste Barousse

Government
  - Mayor (2020–2026): Jean-François Fourquet
- Area^{1}: 1.35 km^{2} (0.52 sq mi)
- Elevation: 550 m (1,800 ft)
- Highest elevation: 630 m (2,070 ft)
- Lowest elevation: 481 m (1,578 ft)
- Population (2023): 59
  - Density: 44/km^{2} (110/sq mi)
- Time zone: UTC+01:00 (CET)
  - Summer (DST): UTC+02:00 (CEST)
- INSEE/Postal code: 65217 /65150
- ^{1} French Land Register data, which excludes lakes, ponds, glaciers > 1 km^{2} (0.386 sq mi or 247 acres) and river estuaries.

Hautaget (French pronunciation: [otaʒɛ]; Occitan: Hauthaget) is a commune in the Hautes-Pyrénées department in south-western France.

== See also ==
- Communes of the Hautes-Pyrénées department
