= Lagrange, Hautes-Pyrénées =

Lagrange
- Commune
- Coat of arms
- Location of Lagrange
- Location within France Location within Occitanie
- Coordinates: 43°07′38″N 0°20′46″E
- Country: France
- Region: Occitania
- Department: Hautes-Pyrénées
- Arrondissement: Bagnères-de-Bigorre
- Canton: La Vallée de la Barousse
- Intercommunality: CC du Plateau de Lannemezan

Government
  - Mayor (2020–2026): Nathalie Salcuni
- Area^{1}: 3.58 km^{2} (1.38 sq mi)
- Elevation: 600 m (2,000 ft)
- Highest elevation: 615 m (2,018 ft)
- Lowest elevation: 470 m (1,540 ft)
- Population (2023): 261
  - Density: 72.9/km^{2} (189/sq mi)
- Time zone: UTC+01:00 (CET)
  - Summer (DST): UTC+02:00 (CEST)
- INSEE/Postal code: 65245 /65300
- ^{1} French Land Register data, which excludes lakes, ponds, glaciers > 1 km^{2} (0.386 sq mi or 247 acres) and river estuaries.

Lagrange (French pronunciation: [laɡʁɑ̃ʒ]; Occitan: Era Granja) is a commune in the Hautes-Pyrénées department in south-western France.

== See also ==
- Communes of the Hautes-Pyrénées department
