= Sainte-Marie, Hautes-Pyrénées =

Sainte-Marie
- Commune
- Location of Sainte-Marie
- Location within France Location within Occitanie
- Coordinates: 42°58′25″N 0°37′20″E
- Country: France
- Region: Occitania
- Department: Hautes-Pyrénées
- Arrondissement: Bagnères-de-Bigorre
- Canton: La Vallée de la Barousse
- Intercommunality: Neste Barousse

Government
  - Mayor (2020–2026): André Duran
- Area^{1}: 0.28 km^{2} (0.11 sq mi)
- Elevation: 450 m (1,480 ft)
- Highest elevation: 478 m (1,568 ft)
- Lowest elevation: 459 m (1,506 ft)
- Population (2023): 58
  - Density: 210/km^{2} (540/sq mi)
- Time zone: UTC+01:00 (CET)
  - Summer (DST): UTC+02:00 (CEST)
- INSEE/Postal code: 65391 /65370
- ^{1} French Land Register data, which excludes lakes, ponds, glaciers > 1 km^{2} (0.386 sq mi or 247 acres) and river estuaries.

Sainte-Marie (French pronunciation: [sɛ̃t maʁi]; Gascon: Senta Maria) is a commune in the Hautes-Pyrénées department in south-western France.

== See also ==
- Communes of the Hautes-Pyrénées department
