= Recurt =

- Commune
- Coat of arms
- Location of Recurt
- Location within France Location within Occitanie
- Coordinates: 43°13′01″N 0°26′12″E
- Country: France
- Region: Occitania
- Department: Hautes-Pyrénées
- Arrondissement: Bagnères-de-Bigorre
- Canton: La Vallée de l'Arros et des Baïses
- Intercommunality: Plateau de Lannemezan
- Area^{1}: 13.43 km^{2} (5.19 sq mi)
- Elevation: 450 m (1,480 ft)
- Highest elevation: 563 m (1,847 ft)
- Lowest elevation: 360 m (1,180 ft)
- Population (2023): 201
  - Density: 15.0/km^{2} (38.8/sq mi)
- Time zone: UTC+01:00 (CET)
  - Summer (DST): UTC+02:00 (CEST)
- INSEE/Postal code: 65376 /65330
- ^{1} French Land Register data, which excludes lakes, ponds, glaciers > 1 km^{2} (0.386 sq mi or 247 acres) and river estuaries.

Recurt is a commune in the Hautes-Pyrénées department in south-western France.

== See also ==
- Communes of the Hautes-Pyrénées department
