= Générest =

- Commune
- Coat of arms
- Location of Générest
- Location within France Location within Occitanie
- Coordinates: 43°02′00″N 0°31′37″E
- Country: France
- Region: Occitania
- Department: Hautes-Pyrénées
- Arrondissement: Bagnères-de-Bigorre
- Canton: La Vallée de la Barousse
- Intercommunality: Neste Barousse

Government
  - Mayor (2023–2026): Jean-Noël Oiry
- Area^{1}: 11.83 km^{2} (4.57 sq mi)
- Elevation: 600 m (2,000 ft)
- Highest elevation: 1,247 m (4,091 ft)
- Lowest elevation: 480 m (1,570 ft)
- Population (2023): 91
  - Density: 7.7/km^{2} (20/sq mi)
- Time zone: UTC+01:00 (CET)
  - Summer (DST): UTC+02:00 (CEST)
- INSEE/Postal code: 65194 /65150
- ^{1} French Land Register data, which excludes lakes, ponds, glaciers > 1 km^{2} (0.386 sq mi or 247 acres) and river estuaries.

Générest is a commune in the Hautes-Pyrénées department in south-western France.

== See also ==
- Communes of the Hautes-Pyrénées department
