= Cantaous =

- Commune
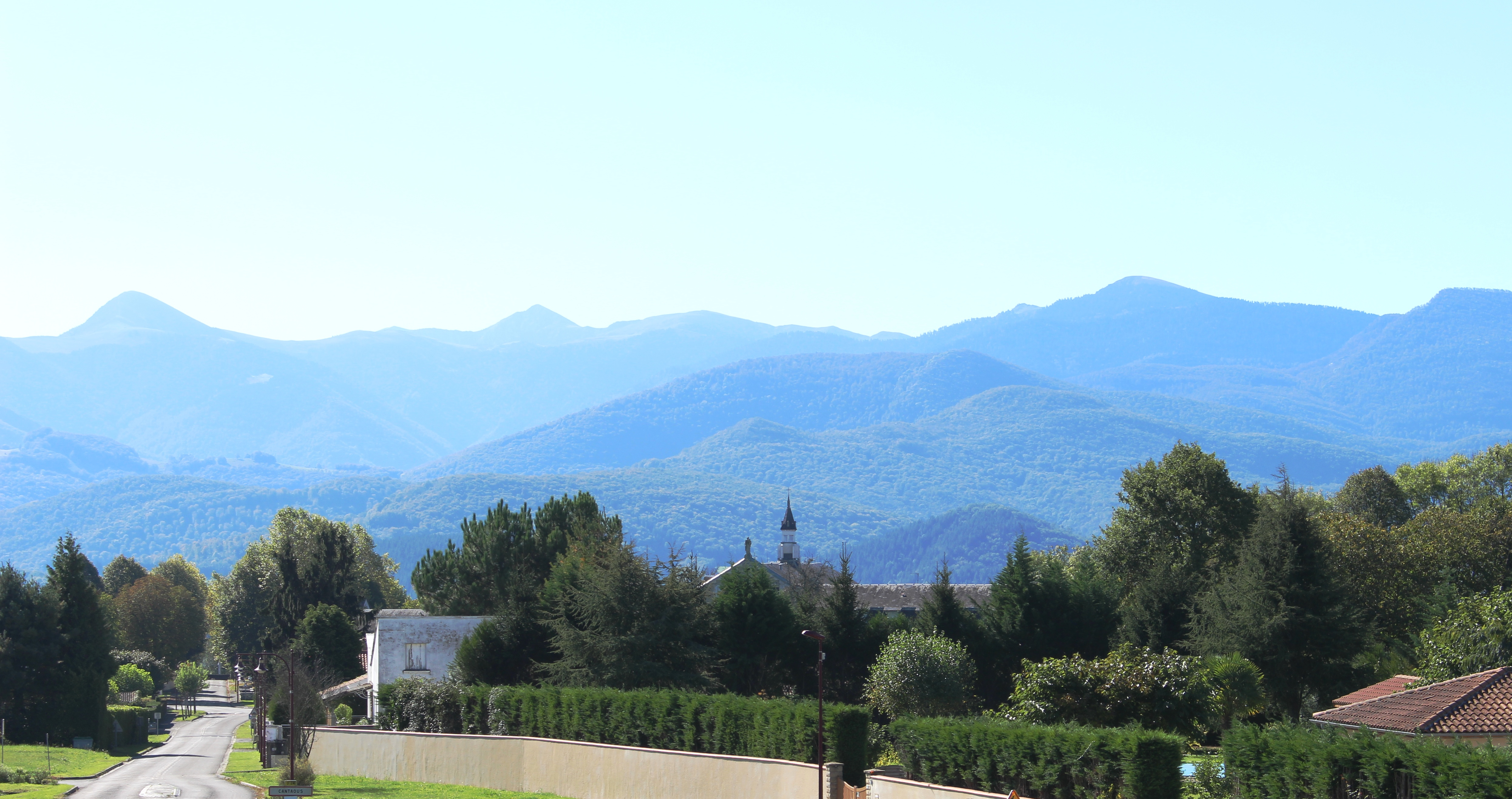
- View of Cantaous

- Coat of arms
- Location of Cantaous
- Location within France Location within Occitanie
- Coordinates: 43°06′12″N 0°26′37″E
- Country: France
- Region: Occitania
- Department: Hautes-Pyrénées
- Arrondissement: Bagnères-de-Bigorre
- Canton: La Vallée de la Barousse
- Intercommunality: Neste Barousse

Government
  - Mayor (2020–2026): Jean-Claude Fetis
- Area^{1}: 5.68 km^{2} (2.19 sq mi)
- Elevation: 600 m (2,000 ft)
- Highest elevation: 611 m (2,005 ft)
- Lowest elevation: 523 m (1,716 ft)
- Population (2023): 424
  - Density: 74.6/km^{2} (193/sq mi)
- Time zone: UTC+01:00 (CET)
  - Summer (DST): UTC+02:00 (CEST)
- INSEE/Postal code: 65482 /65150
- ^{1} French Land Register data, which excludes lakes, ponds, glaciers > 1 km^{2} (0.386 sq mi or 247 acres) and river estuaries.

Cantaous (French pronunciation: [kɑ̃taus]; Occitan: Eths Cantaus) is a commune in the Hautes-Pyrénées department in south-western France.

== See also ==
- Communes of the Hautes-Pyrénées department
