= Esbareich =

- Commune
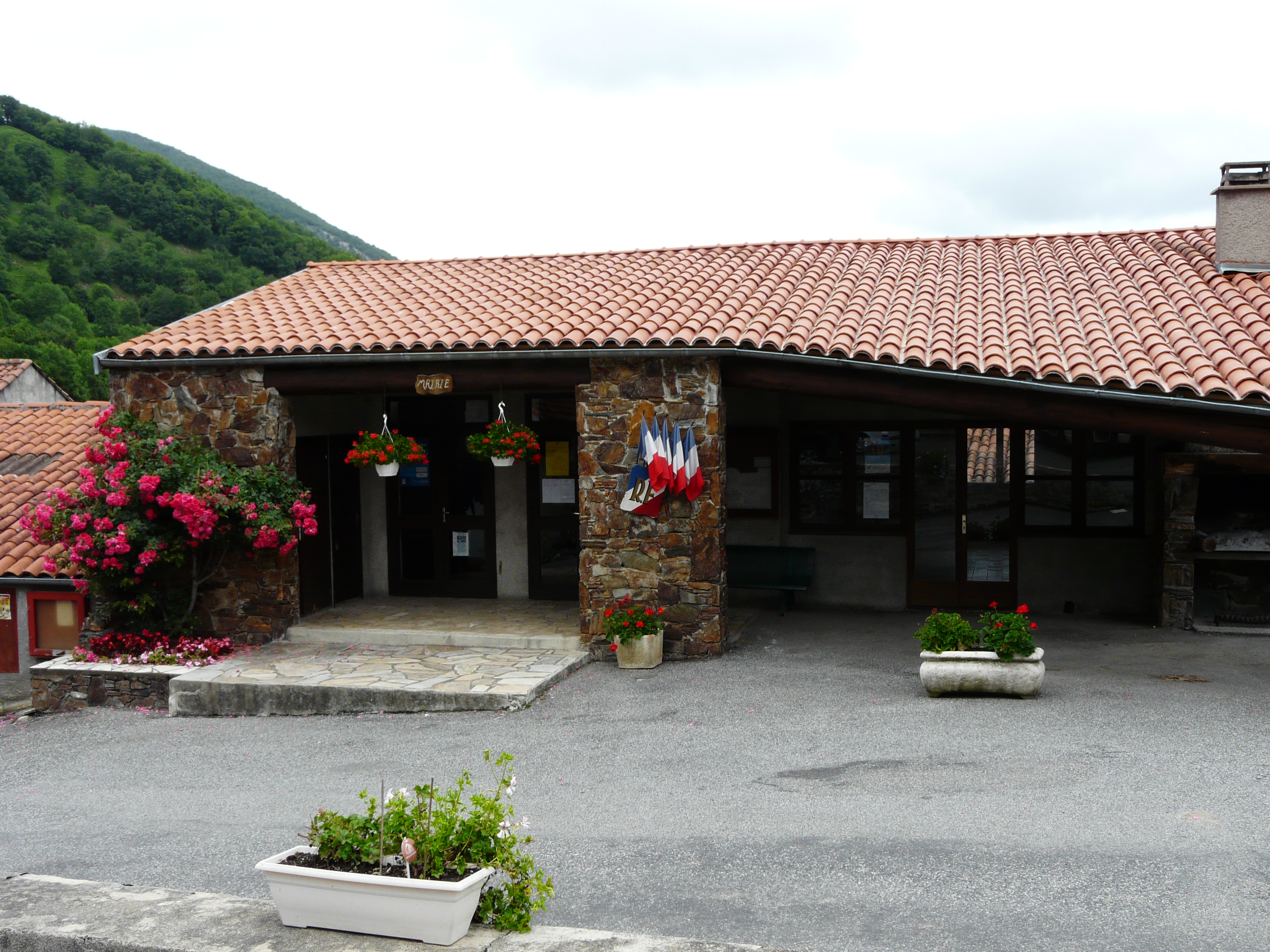
- The town hall of Esbareich

- Coat of arms
- Location of Esbareich
- Location within France Location within Occitanie
- Coordinates: 42°56′44″N 0°33′46″E
- Country: France
- Region: Occitania
- Department: Hautes-Pyrénées
- Arrondissement: Bagnères-de-Bigorre
- Canton: La Vallée de la Barousse
- Intercommunality: Neste Barousse

Government
  - Mayor (2020–2026): Julien Bégué
- Area^{1}: 8.68 km^{2} (3.35 sq mi)
- Elevation: 654 m (2,146 ft)
- Highest elevation: 1,675 m (5,495 ft)
- Lowest elevation: 614 m (2,014 ft)
- Population (2023): 83
  - Density: 9.6/km^{2} (25/sq mi)
- Time zone: UTC+01:00 (CET)
  - Summer (DST): UTC+02:00 (CEST)
- INSEE/Postal code: 65158 /65370
- ^{1} French Land Register data, which excludes lakes, ponds, glaciers > 1 km^{2} (0.386 sq mi or 247 acres) and river estuaries.

Esbareich (French pronunciation: [ɛsbaʁɛʃ]; Occitan: Esbarèish) is a commune in the Hautes-Pyrénées department in south-western France.

== See also ==
- Communes of the Hautes-Pyrénées department
