= Montsérié =

- Commune
- Coat of arms
- Location of Montsérié
- Location within France Location within Occitanie
- Coordinates: 43°03′02″N 0°26′15″E
- Country: France
- Region: Occitania
- Department: Hautes-Pyrénées
- Arrondissement: Bagnères-de-Bigorre
- Canton: La Vallée de la Barousse
- Intercommunality: Neste Barousse

Government
  - Mayor (2020–2026): Jean-Claude Rogé
- Area^{1}: 2.25 km^{2} (0.87 sq mi)
- Elevation: 500 m (1,600 ft)
- Highest elevation: 762 m (2,500 ft)
- Lowest elevation: 502 m (1,647 ft)
- Population (2023): 67
  - Density: 30/km^{2} (77/sq mi)
- Time zone: UTC+01:00 (CET)
  - Summer (DST): UTC+02:00 (CEST)
- INSEE/Postal code: 65323 /65150
- ^{1} French Land Register data, which excludes lakes, ponds, glaciers > 1 km^{2} (0.386 sq mi or 247 acres) and river estuaries.

Montsérié (French pronunciation: [mɔ̃seʁje]; Occitan: Montcirèr) is a commune in the Hautes-Pyrénées department in south-western France.

== See also ==
- Communes of the Hautes-Pyrénées department
