= Tibiran-Jaunac =

- Commune
- Coat of arms
- Location of Tibiran-Jaunac
- Location within France Location within Occitanie
- Coordinates: 43°02′57″N 0°32′41″E
- Country: France
- Region: Occitania
- Department: Hautes-Pyrénées
- Arrondissement: Bagnères-de-Bigorre
- Canton: La Vallée de la Barousse
- Intercommunality: Neste Barousse

Government
  - Mayor (2020–2026): Marie-Noëlle Taillebresse
- Area^{1}: 6.38 km^{2} (2.46 sq mi)
- Elevation: 582 m (1,909 ft)
- Highest elevation: 783 m (2,569 ft)
- Lowest elevation: 415 m (1,362 ft)
- Population (2023): 327
  - Density: 51.3/km^{2} (133/sq mi)
- Time zone: UTC+01:00 (CET)
  - Summer (DST): UTC+02:00 (CEST)
- INSEE/Postal code: 65444 /65660
- ^{1} French Land Register data, which excludes lakes, ponds, glaciers > 1 km^{2} (0.386 sq mi or 247 acres) and river estuaries.

Tibiran-Jaunac (French pronunciation: [tibiʁɑ̃ ʒonak]; Occitan: Tibiran e Jaunac) is a commune in the Hautes-Pyrénées department in south-western France.

== See also ==
- Communes of the Hautes-Pyrénées department
