= Thèbe =

- Commune
- Coat of arms
- Location of Thèbe
- Location within France Location within Occitanie
- Coordinates: 42°58′00″N 0°35′28″E
- Country: France
- Region: Occitania
- Department: Hautes-Pyrénées
- Arrondissement: Bagnères-de-Bigorre
- Canton: La Vallée de la Barousse
- Intercommunality: Neste Barousse

Government
  - Mayor (2021–2026): Jean-Pierre Abadie
- Area^{1}: 7.6 km^{2} (2.9 sq mi)
- Elevation: 580 m (1,900 ft)
- Highest elevation: 1,587 m (5,207 ft)
- Lowest elevation: 520 m (1,710 ft)
- Population (2023): 97
  - Density: 13/km^{2} (33/sq mi)
- Time zone: UTC+01:00 (CET)
  - Summer (DST): UTC+02:00 (CEST)
- INSEE/Postal code: 65441 /65370
- ^{1} French Land Register data, which excludes lakes, ponds, glaciers > 1 km^{2} (0.386 sq mi or 247 acres) and river estuaries.

Thèbe (French pronunciation: [tɛb]; Occitan: Teve) is a commune in the Hautes-Pyrénées department in south-western France.

== See also ==
- Communes of the Hautes-Pyrénées department
