= Sost, Hautes-Pyrénées =

Sost
- Commune
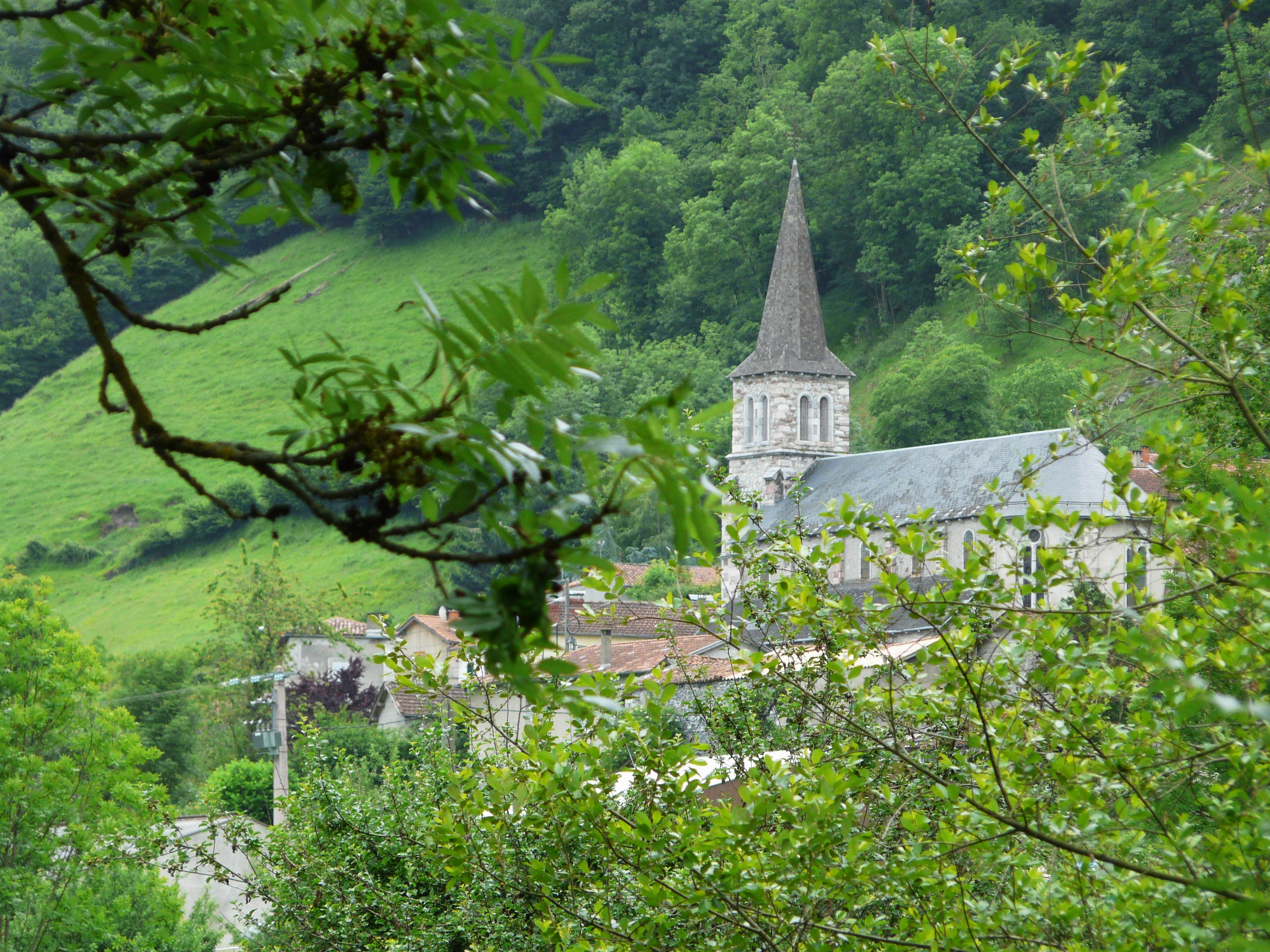
- The village of Sost

- Coat of arms
- Location of Sost
- Location within France Location within Occitanie
- Coordinates: 42°55′48″N 0°33′28″E
- Country: France
- Region: Occitania
- Department: Hautes-Pyrénées
- Arrondissement: Bagnères-de-Bigorre
- Canton: La Vallée de la Barousse
- Intercommunality: Neste Barousse

Government
  - Mayor (2020–2026): Colette Abadie
- Area^{1}: 32.05 km^{2} (12.37 sq mi)
- Elevation: 736 m (2,415 ft)
- Highest elevation: 1,958 m (6,424 ft)
- Lowest elevation: 710 m (2,330 ft)
- Population (2023): 97
  - Density: 3.0/km^{2} (7.8/sq mi)
- Time zone: UTC+01:00 (CET)
  - Summer (DST): UTC+02:00 (CEST)
- INSEE/Postal code: 65431 /65370
- ^{1} French Land Register data, which excludes lakes, ponds, glaciers > 1 km^{2} (0.386 sq mi or 247 acres) and river estuaries.

Sost (French pronunciation: [sɔst]; Occitan: Sòst) is a commune in the Hautes-Pyrénées department in south-western France.

== See also ==
- Communes of the Hautes-Pyrénées department
