= Arrondissement of Bagnères-de-Bigorre =

Coordinates: 43.07°N 0.15°E

Bagnères-de-Bigorre
- Arrondissement
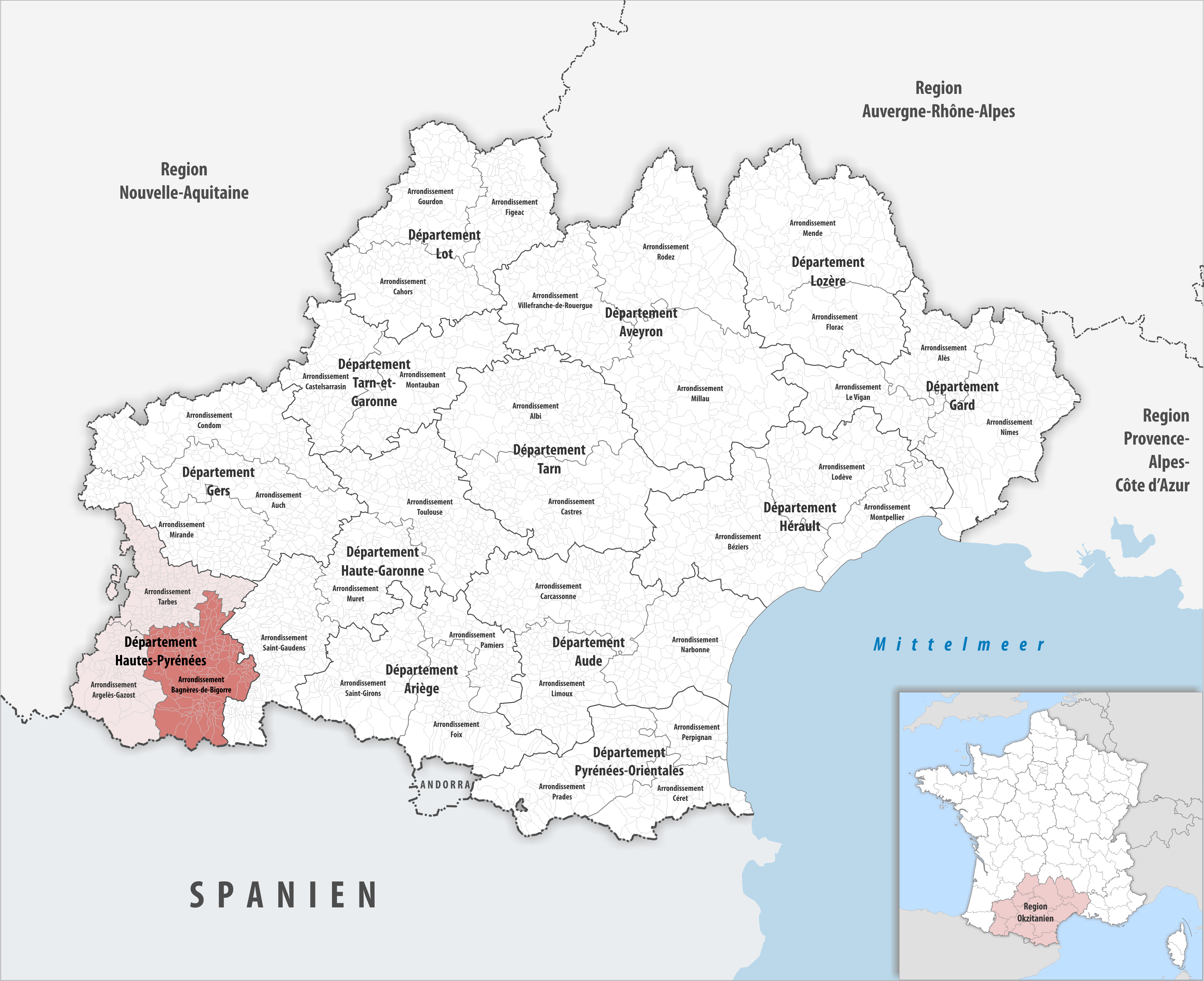
- Location within the region Occitanie
- Country: France
- Region: Occitania
- Department: Hautes-Pyrénées
- No. of communes: {{{nbcomm}}}
- Area: 1,783.5 km^{2} (688.6 sq mi)
- Population (2023): 48,451
  - Density: 27.166/km^{2} (70.360/sq mi)
- INSEE code: 652

The arrondissement of Bagnères-de-Bigorre is an arrondissement of France in the Hautes-Pyrénées department in the Occitanie region. It has 170 communes. Its population is 48,213 (2021), and its area is 1,783.5 km^{2} (688.6 sq mi).

== Composition ==
The communes of the arrondissement of Bagnères-de-Bigorre, and their INSEE codes, are:

1. Adervielle-Pouchergues (65003)
2. Ancizan (65006)
3. Anères (65009)
4. Anla (65012)
5. Antichan (65014)
6. Antist (65016)
7. Aragnouet (65017)
8. Ardengost (65023)
9. Argelès-Bagnères (65024)
10. Arné (65028)
11. Arreau (65031)
12. Arrodets (65034)
13. Artiguemy (65037)
14. Aspin-Aure (65039)
15. Asque (65041)
16. Asté (65042)
17. Astugue (65043)
18. Aulon (65046)
19. Avajan (65050)
20. Aventignan (65051)
21. Aveux (65053)
22. Avezac-Prat-Lahitte (65054)
23. Azet (65058)
24. Bagnères-de-Bigorre (65059)
25. Banios (65060)
26. Bareilles (65064)
27. Barrancoueu (65066)
28. La Barthe-de-Neste (65069)
29. Batsère (65071)
30. Bazus-Aure (65075)
31. Bazus-Neste (65076)
32. Beaudéan (65078)
33. Benqué-Molère (65081)
34. Bertren (65087)
35. Bettes (65091)
36. Beyrède-Jumet-Camous (65092)
37. Bize (65093)
38. Bizous (65094)
39. Bonnemazon (65096)
40. Bonrepos (65097)
41. Bordères-Louron (65099)
42. Bourg-de-Bigorre (65105)
43. Bourisp (65106)
44. Bramevaque (65109)
45. Bulan (65111)
46. Cadéac (65116)
47. Cadeilhan-Trachère (65117)
48. Campan (65123)
49. Camparan (65124)
50. Campistrous (65125)
51. Cantaous (65482)
52. Capvern (65127)
53. Castelbajac (65128)
54. Castillon (65135)
55. Cazarilh (65139)
56. Cazaux-Debat (65140)
57. Cazaux-Fréchet-Anéran-Camors (65141)
58. Chelle-Spou (65143)
59. Cieutat (65147)
60. Clarens (65150)
61. Créchets (65154)
62. Ens (65157)
63. Esbareich (65158)
64. Escala (65159)
65. Esconnets (65162)
66. Escots (65163)
67. Esparros (65165)
68. Espèche (65166)
69. Espieilh (65167)
70. Estarvielle (65171)
71. Estensan (65172)
72. Ferrère (65175)
73. Fréchendets (65179)
74. Fréchet-Aure (65180)
75. Galan (65183)
76. Galez (65184)
77. Gaudent (65186)
78. Gazave (65190)
79. Gembrie (65193)
80. Générest (65194)
81. Génos (65195)
82. Gerde (65198)
83. Germ (65199)
84. Gouaux (65205)
85. Gourgue (65207)
86. Grailhen (65208)
87. Grézian (65209)
88. Guchan (65211)
89. Guchen (65212)
90. Hauban (65216)
91. Hautaget (65217)
92. Hèches (65218)
93. Hiis (65221)
94. Houeydets (65224)
95. Ilhet (65228)
96. Ilheu (65229)
97. Izaourt (65230)
98. Izaux (65231)
99. Jézeau (65234)
100. Labassère (65238)
101. Labastide (65239)
102. Laborde (65241)
103. Lagrange (65245)
104. Lançon (65255)
105. Lannemezan (65258)
106. Libaros (65274)
107. Lies (65275)
108. Lombrès (65277)
109. Lomné (65278)
110. Lortet (65279)
111. Loudenvielle (65282)
112. Loudervielle (65283)
113. Loures-Barousse (65287)
114. Lutilhous (65294)
115. Marsas (65300)
116. Mauléon-Barousse (65305)
117. Mauvezin (65306)
118. Mazères-de-Neste (65307)
119. Mazouau (65309)
120. Mérilheu (65310)
121. Mont (65317)
122. Montastruc (65318)
123. Montégut (65319)
124. Montgaillard (65320)
125. Montoussé (65322)
126. Montsérié (65323)
127. Nestier (65327)
128. Neuilh (65328)
129. Nistos (65329)
130. Ordizan (65335)
131. Orignac (65338)
132. Ourde (65347)
133. Pailhac (65354)
134. Péré (65356)
135. Pinas (65363)
136. Pouzac (65370)
137. Recurt (65376)
138. Réjaumont (65377)
139. Ris (65379)
140. Sabarros (65381)
141. Sacoué (65382)
142. Sailhan (65384)
143. Saint-Arroman (65385)
144. Sainte-Marie (65391)
145. Saint-Lary-Soulan (65388)
146. Saint-Laurent-de-Neste (65389)
147. Saint-Paul (65394)
148. Saléchan (65398)
149. Samuran (65402)
150. Sarlabous (65405)
151. Sarp (65407)
152. Sarrancolin (65408)
153. Seich (65416)
154. Sentous (65419)
155. Siradan (65427)
156. Sost (65431)
157. Tajan (65437)
158. Thèbe (65441)
159. Tibiran-Jaunac (65444)
160. Tilhouse (65445)
161. Tournous-Devant (65449)
162. Tramezaïgues (65450)
163. Trébons (65451)
164. Troubat (65453)
165. Tuzaguet (65455)
166. Uglas (65456)
167. Uzer (65459)
168. Vielle-Aure (65465)
169. Vielle-Louron (65466)
170. Vignec (65471)

== History ==
The arrondissement of Bagnères-de-Bigorre was created in 1800. In January 2017 it gained 13 communes from the arrondissement of Tarbes.

As a result of the reorganisation of the cantons of France which came into effect in 2015, the borders of the cantons are no longer related to the borders of the arrondissements. The cantons of the arrondissement of Bagnères-de-Bigorre were, as of January 2015:

1. Arreau
2. Bagnères-de-Bigorre
3. La Barthe-de-Neste
4. Bordères-Louron
5. Campan
6. Lannemezan
7. Mauléon-Barousse
8. Saint-Laurent-de-Neste
9. Vielle-Aure
