= Bertren =

- Commune
- Coat of arms
- Location of Bertren
- Location within France Location within Occitanie
- Coordinates: 43°00′05″N 0°37′08″E
- Country: France
- Region: Occitania
- Department: Hautes-Pyrénées
- Arrondissement: Bagnères-de-Bigorre
- Canton: La Vallée de la Barousse

Government
  - Mayor (2020–2026): Thierry Gonzalez
- Area^{1}: 2.66 km^{2} (1.03 sq mi)
- Elevation: 450 m (1,480 ft)
- Highest elevation: 894 m (2,933 ft)
- Lowest elevation: 442 m (1,450 ft)
- Population (2023): 153
  - Density: 57.5/km^{2} (149/sq mi)
- Time zone: UTC+01:00 (CET)
  - Summer (DST): UTC+02:00 (CEST)
- INSEE/Postal code: 65087 /65370
- ^{1} French Land Register data, which excludes lakes, ponds, glaciers > 1 km^{2} (0.386 sq mi or 247 acres) and river estuaries.

Bertren is a commune in the Hautes-Pyrénées department in southwestern France.

== Population ==
Historical population
Year	Pop.	±% p.a.
1968	250	—
1975	253	+0.17%
1982	255	+0.11%
1990	214	−2.17%
1999	195	−1.03%
2007	209	+0.87%
2012	225	+1.49%
2017	174	−5.01%
2023	153	−2.12%
Source: INSEE

== See also ==
- Communes of the Hautes-Pyrénées department
