= Montégut, Hautes-Pyrénées =

Montégut
- Commune
- Coat of arms
- Location of Montégut
- Location within France Location within Occitanie
- Coordinates: 43°03′53″N 0°30′15″E
- Country: France
- Region: Occitania
- Department: Hautes-Pyrénées
- Arrondissement: Bagnères-de-Bigorre
- Canton: La Vallée de la Barousse
- Intercommunality: Neste Barousse

Government
  - Mayor (2020–2026): Michel Tailliez
- Area^{1}: 6.94 km^{2} (2.68 sq mi)
- Elevation: 420 m (1,380 ft)
- Highest elevation: 907 m (2,976 ft)
- Lowest elevation: 447 m (1,467 ft)
- Population (2023): 126
  - Density: 18.2/km^{2} (47.0/sq mi)
- Time zone: UTC+01:00 (CET)
  - Summer (DST): UTC+02:00 (CEST)
- INSEE/Postal code: 65319 /65150
- ^{1} French Land Register data, which excludes lakes, ponds, glaciers > 1 km^{2} (0.386 sq mi or 247 acres) and river estuaries.

Montégut (French pronunciation: [mɔ̃teɡy]; Occitan: Montagut) is a commune in the Hautes-Pyrénées department in south-western France.

== Geography ==
=== Climate ===
Montégut has an oceanic climate (Köppen climate classification Cfb). The average annual temperature in Montégut is 11.8 °C (53.2 °F). The average annual rainfall is 1,048.2 mm (41.27 in) with May as the wettest month. The temperatures are highest on average in July, at around 19.5 °C (67.1 °F), and lowest in January, at around 4.7 °C (40.5 °F). The highest temperature ever recorded in Montégut was 38.0 °C (100.4 °F) on 26 August 2010; the coldest temperature ever recorded was −12.3 °C (9.9 °F) on 8 February 2012.

Climate data for Montégut (1981−2010 normals, extremes 2008−2014)
| Month | Jan | Feb | Mar | Apr | May | Jun | Jul | Aug | Sep | Oct | Nov | Dec | Year |
|---|---|---|---|---|---|---|---|---|---|---|---|---|---|
| Record high °C (°F) | 20.5 (68.9) | 23.0 (73.4) | 25.4 (77.7) | 28.5 (83.3) | 30.5 (86.9) | 34.0 (93.2) | 36.0 (96.8) | 38.0 (100.4) | 32.0 (89.6) | 31.0 (87.8) | 27.0 (80.6) | 22.2 (72.0) | 38.0 (100.4) |
| Mean daily maximum °C (°F) | 9.1 (48.4) | 10.4 (50.7) | 13.7 (56.7) | 15.5 (59.9) | 19.1 (66.4) | 22.6 (72.7) | 25.0 (77.0) | 25.0 (77.0) | 22.3 (72.1) | 17.9 (64.2) | 12.5 (54.5) | 9.7 (49.5) | 16.9 (62.4) |
| Daily mean °C (°F) | 4.7 (40.5) | 5.6 (42.1) | 8.4 (47.1) | 10.2 (50.4) | 13.8 (56.8) | 17.3 (63.1) | 19.5 (67.1) | 19.5 (67.1) | 16.6 (61.9) | 12.7 (54.9) | 8.0 (46.4) | 5.4 (41.7) | 11.8 (53.2) |
| Mean daily minimum °C (°F) | 0.2 (32.4) | 0.8 (33.4) | 3.0 (37.4) | 4.8 (40.6) | 8.4 (47.1) | 11.9 (53.4) | 14.1 (57.4) | 14.0 (57.2) | 11.0 (51.8) | 7.6 (45.7) | 3.4 (38.1) | 1.0 (33.8) | 6.7 (44.1) |
| Record low °C (°F) | −10.0 (14.0) | −12.3 (9.9) | −5.0 (23.0) | −0.9 (30.4) | 0.0 (32.0) | 5.0 (41.0) | 8.1 (46.6) | 7.0 (44.6) | 4.5 (40.1) | −3.5 (25.7) | −6.0 (21.2) | −9.0 (15.8) | −12.3 (9.9) |
| Average precipitation mm (inches) | 96.1 (3.78) | 75.1 (2.96) | 86.3 (3.40) | 107.1 (4.22) | 110.4 (4.35) | 74.3 (2.93) | 69.1 (2.72) | 77.0 (3.03) | 79.8 (3.14) | 81.5 (3.21) | 96.2 (3.79) | 95.3 (3.75) | 1,048.2 (41.27) |
| Average precipitation days (≥ 1.0 mm) | 10.6 | 9.5 | 10.3 | 12.2 | 12.4 | 9.4 | 7.7 | 9.2 | 8.9 | 10.1 | 10.0 | 10.6 | 121.0 |
Source: Météo-France

== See also ==
- Communes of the Hautes-Pyrénées department
