= Mazères-de-Neste =

- Commune
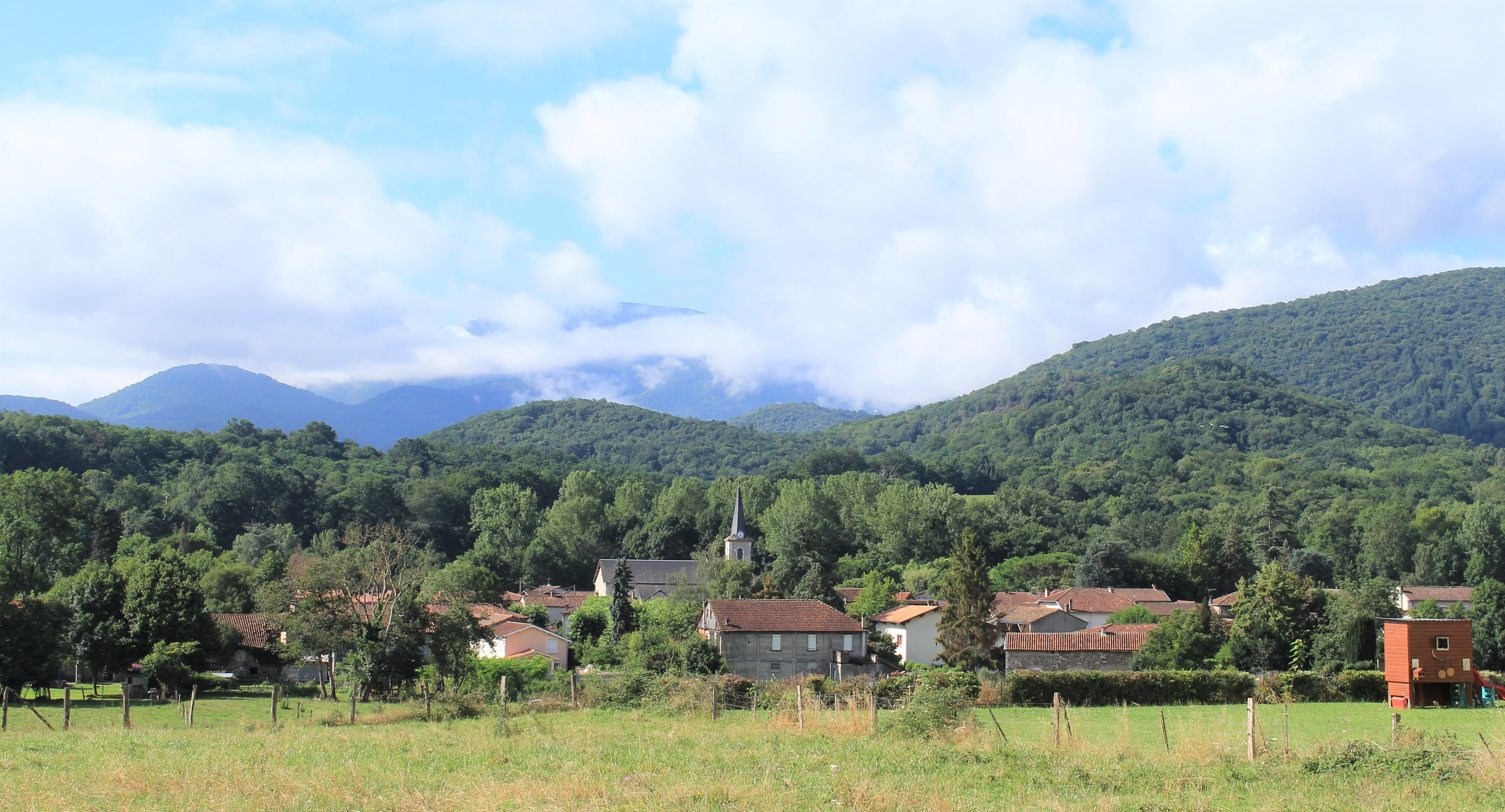

- Coat of arms
- Location of Mazères-de-Neste
- Location within France Location within Occitanie
- Coordinates: 43°04′21″N 0°32′41″E
- Country: France
- Region: Occitania
- Department: Hautes-Pyrénées
- Arrondissement: Bagnères-de-Bigorre
- Canton: La Vallée de la Barousse
- Intercommunality: Neste Barousse

Government
  - Mayor (2020–2026): Joël Buetas
- Area^{1}: 3.36 km^{2} (1.30 sq mi)
- Elevation: 456 m (1,496 ft)
- Highest elevation: 546 m (1,791 ft)
- Lowest elevation: 419 m (1,375 ft)
- Population (2023): 350
  - Density: 100/km^{2} (270/sq mi)
- Time zone: UTC+01:00 (CET)
  - Summer (DST): UTC+02:00 (CEST)
- INSEE/Postal code: 65307 /65660
- ^{1} French Land Register data, which excludes lakes, ponds, glaciers > 1 km^{2} (0.386 sq mi or 247 acres) and river estuaries.

Mazères-de-Neste (French pronunciation: [mazɛʁ də nɛst], literally Mazères of Neste; Occitan: Maseras de Nestés) is a commune in the Hautes-Pyrénées department in south-western France.

== See also ==
- Communes of the Hautes-Pyrénées department
