= Réjaumont, Hautes-Pyrénées =

Réjaumont
- Commune
- Coat of arms
- Location of Réjaumont
- Location within France Location within Occitanie
- Coordinates: 43°09′37″N 0°27′02″E
- Country: France
- Region: Occitania
- Department: Hautes-Pyrénées
- Arrondissement: Bagnères-de-Bigorre
- Canton: La Vallée de la Barousse
- Intercommunality: CC du Plateau de Lannemezan

Government
  - Mayor (2020–2026): Guy Raynal
- Area^{1}: 6.7 km^{2} (2.6 sq mi)
- Elevation: 470 m (1,540 ft)
- Highest elevation: 569 m (1,867 ft)
- Lowest elevation: 413 m (1,355 ft)
- Population (2023): 146
  - Density: 22/km^{2} (56/sq mi)
- Time zone: UTC+01:00 (CET)
  - Summer (DST): UTC+02:00 (CEST)
- INSEE/Postal code: 65377 /65300
- ^{1} French Land Register data, which excludes lakes, ponds, glaciers > 1 km^{2} (0.386 sq mi or 247 acres) and river estuaries.

Réjaumont (French pronunciation: [ʁeʒomɔ̃]; Occitan: Rejaumont) is a commune in the Hautes-Pyrénées department in south-western France.

== See also ==
- Communes of the Hautes-Pyrénées department
