= Saint-Laurent-de-Neste =

- Commune
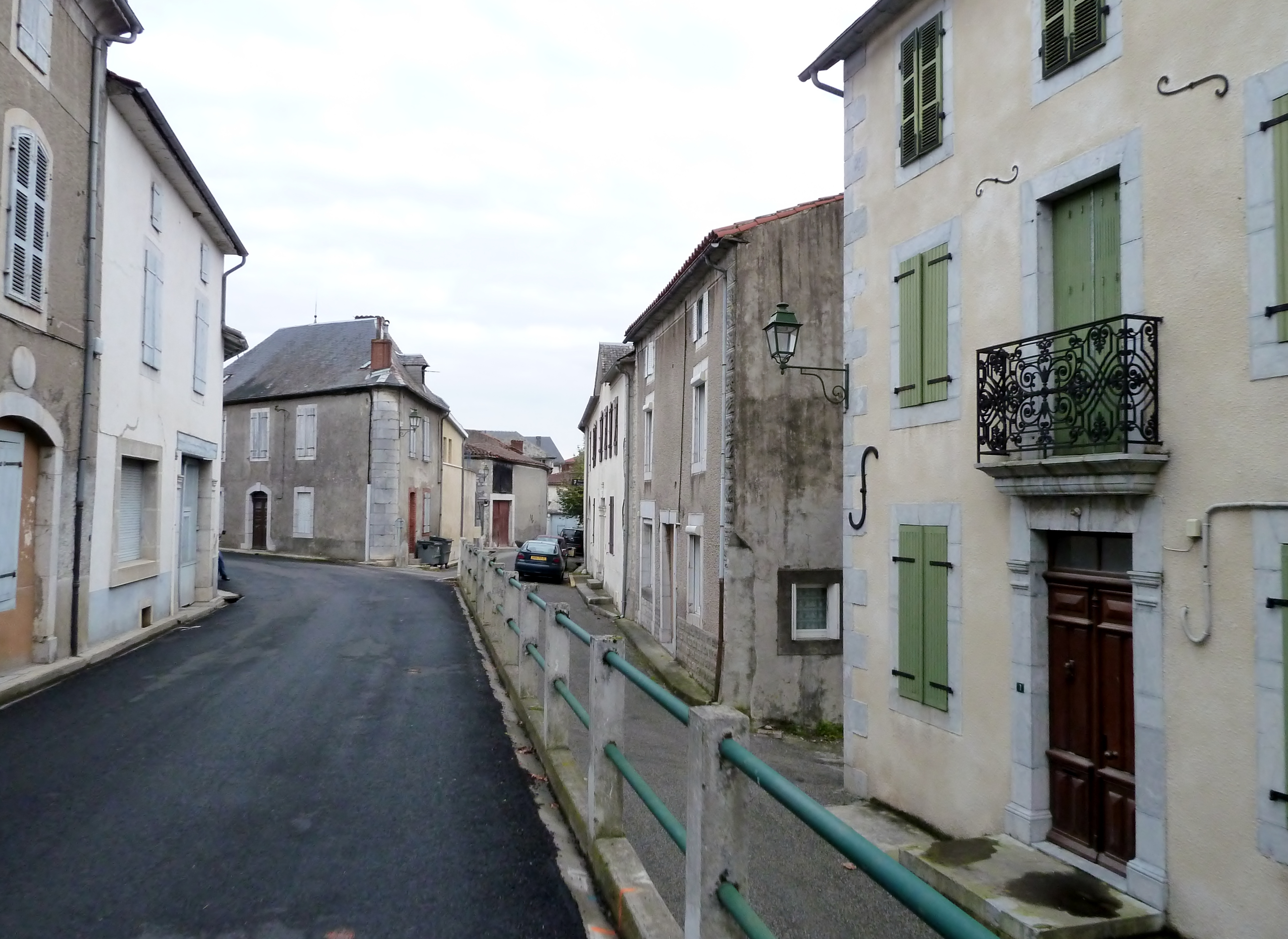
- A street in Saint-Laurent-de-Neste

- Coat of arms
- Location of Saint-Laurent-de-Neste
- Location within France Location within Occitanie
- Coordinates: 43°04′43″N 0°28′58″E
- Country: France
- Region: Occitania
- Department: Hautes-Pyrénées
- Arrondissement: Bagnères-de-Bigorre
- Canton: La Vallée de la Barousse
- Intercommunality: Neste Barousse

Government
  - Mayor (2020–2026): Gilbert Carrere
- Area^{1}: 10.41 km^{2} (4.02 sq mi)
- Elevation: 467 m (1,532 ft)
- Highest elevation: 585 m (1,919 ft)
- Lowest elevation: 456 m (1,496 ft)
- Population (2023): 964
  - Density: 92.6/km^{2} (240/sq mi)
- Time zone: UTC+01:00 (CET)
  - Summer (DST): UTC+02:00 (CEST)
- INSEE/Postal code: 65389 /65150
- ^{1} French Land Register data, which excludes lakes, ponds, glaciers > 1 km^{2} (0.386 sq mi or 247 acres) and river estuaries.

Saint-Laurent-de-Neste (French pronunciation: [sɛ̃ loʁɑ̃ də nɛst], literally Saint-Laurent of Neste; Occitan: Sent Laurenç de Nestés, before 1962: Saint-Laurent) is a commune in the Hautes-Pyrénées department in south-western France.

== See also ==
- Communes of the Hautes-Pyrénées department
