= Cazaux (disambiguation) =

Cazaux is a commune of the Ariège department in southwestern France.

Cazaux may also refer to:

== Places ==
- Cazaux, a village in La Teste-de-Buch in the Gironde department in southwestern France
  - Cazaux Air Base, a French Air and Space Force in the village
- Cazaux-d'Anglès, a commune in the Gers department in southwestern France
- Cazaux-Debat, a commune in the Hautes-Pyrénées department in southwestern France
- Cazaux-Fréchet-Anéran-Camors, a commune in the Hautes-Pyrénées department in southwestern France
- Cazaux-Layrisse, a commune in the Haute-Garonne department in southwestern France
- Cazaux-Savès, a commune in the Gers department in southwestern France
- Cazaux-Villecomtal, a commune in the Gers department in southwestern France
- Cabanac-Cazaux, a commune in the Haute-Garonne department in southwestern France
- Étang de Cazaux et de Sanguinet, a lake in southwestern France
- Sainte-Aurence-Cazaux, a commune in the Gers department in southwestern France

== People ==
- Arthur Cazaux (born 2002), a French tennis player
- Pierre Cazaux (born 1984), a French former road cyclist
- Ray Cazaux (1917–1999), an English freestyle sport wrestler
