= Lançon =

Lançon may refer to the following places in France:

- Lançon, Ardennes, a commune in the Ardennes department
- Lançon, Hautes-Pyrénées, a commune in the Hautes-Pyrénées department
- Lançon-Provence, a commune in the Bouches-du-Rhône department
