= Bazus-Neste =

- Commune
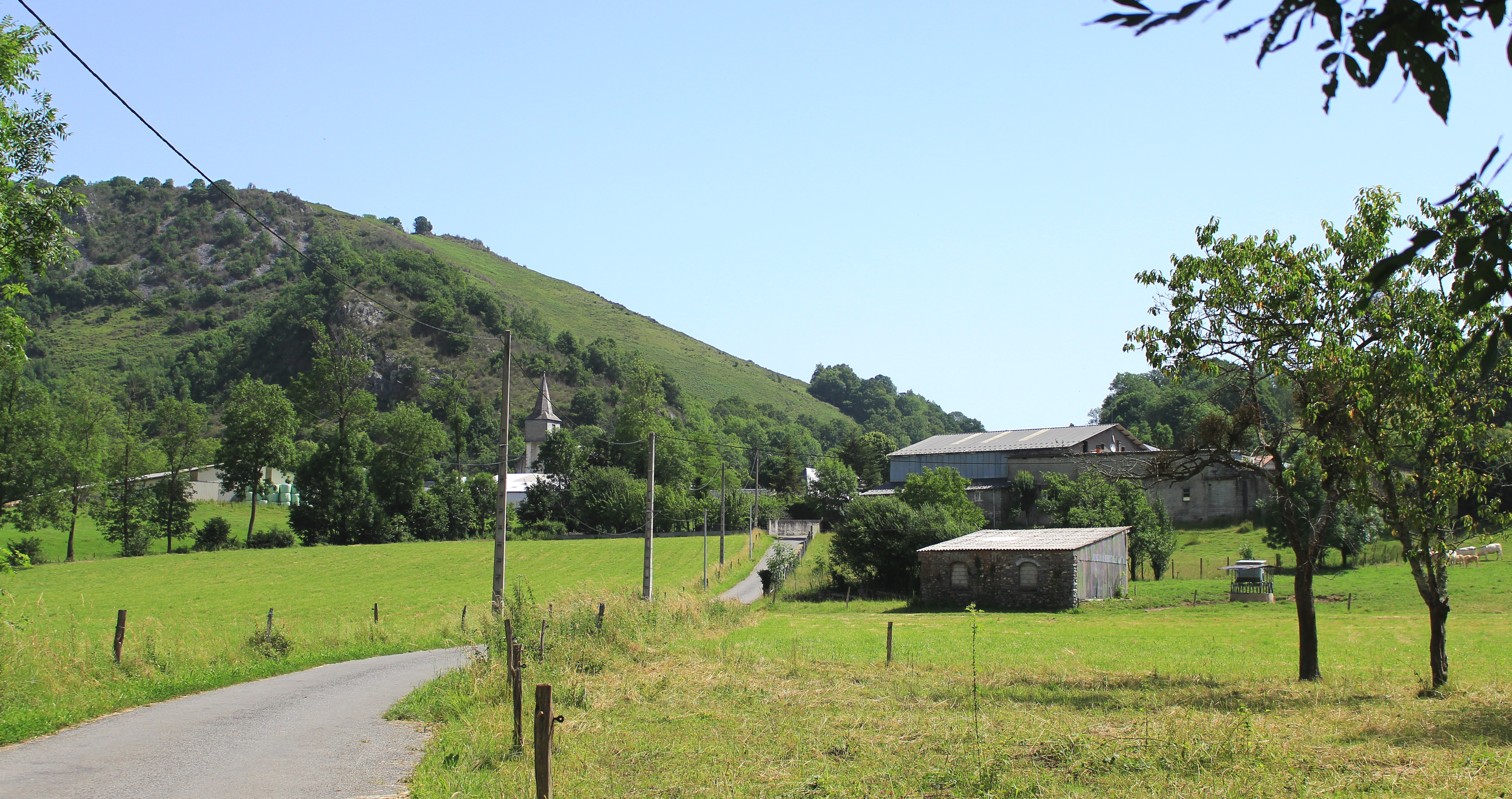
- Bazus-Neste (Hautes-Pyrénées

- Coat of arms
- Location of Bazus-Neste
- Location within France Location within Occitanie
- Coordinates: 43°02′10″N 0°22′55″E
- Country: France
- Region: Occitania
- Department: Hautes-Pyrénées
- Arrondissement: Bagnères-de-Bigorre
- Canton: Neste, Aure et Louron

Government
  - Mayor (2020–2026): Francis Escudé
- Area^{1}: 2.49 km^{2} (0.96 sq mi)
- Elevation: 600 m (2,000 ft)
- Highest elevation: 1,138 m (3,734 ft)
- Lowest elevation: 556 m (1,824 ft)
- Population (2023): 39
  - Density: 16/km^{2} (41/sq mi)
- Time zone: UTC+01:00 (CET)
  - Summer (DST): UTC+02:00 (CEST)
- INSEE/Postal code: 65076 /65250
- ^{1} French Land Register data, which excludes lakes, ponds, glaciers > 1 km^{2} (0.386 sq mi or 247 acres) and river estuaries.

Bazus-Neste is a commune in the Hautes-Pyrénées department in southwestern France.

== Geography ==
The commune Bazus-Neste was formerly included in the country of the Four Valleys, the diocese of Comminges. The commune is just 1640 yards downstream from the first foothills of the Pyrenees

== Population ==
Historical population
Year	Pop.	±% p.a.
1968	56	—
1975	64	+1.93%
1982	46	−4.61%
1990	53	+1.79%
1999	45	−1.80%
2007	41	−1.16%
2012	54	+5.66%
2017	59	+1.79%
2023	39	−6.67%
Source: INSEE

== See also ==
- Communes of the Hautes-Pyrénées department
