= Labastide =

Labastide Era Bastida (Occitan)
- Commune
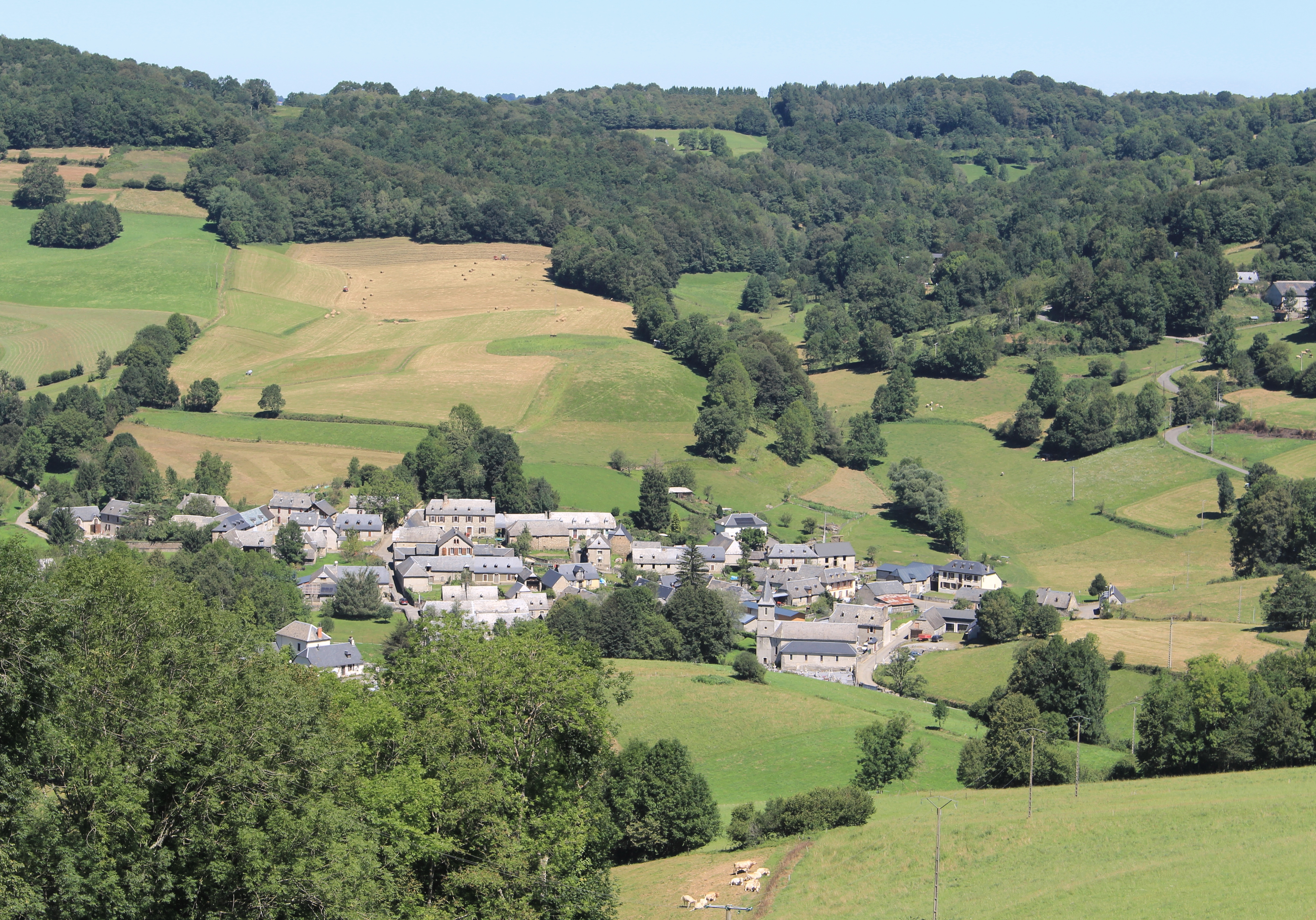
- A view of Labastide

- Coat of arms
- Location of Labastide
- Location within France Location within Occitanie
- Coordinates: 43°02′12″N 0°21′14″E
- Country: France
- Region: Occitania
- Department: Hautes-Pyrénées
- Arrondissement: Bagnères-de-Bigorre
- Canton: Neste, Aure et Louron
- Intercommunality: Plateau de Lannemezan

Government
  - Mayor (2020–2026): Alain Dasque
- Area^{1}: 5.58 km^{2} (2.15 sq mi)
- Elevation: 540 m (1,770 ft)
- Highest elevation: 800 m (2,600 ft)
- Lowest elevation: 532 m (1,745 ft)
- Population (2023): 147
  - Density: 26.3/km^{2} (68.2/sq mi)
- Time zone: UTC+01:00 (CET)
  - Summer (DST): UTC+02:00 (CEST)
- INSEE/Postal code: 65239 /65130
- ^{1} French Land Register data, which excludes lakes, ponds, glaciers > 1 km^{2} (0.386 sq mi or 247 acres) and river estuaries.

Labastide (French pronunciation: [labastid]; Occitan: Era Bastida) is a commune in the Hautes-Pyrénées department in the Occitania region in Southwestern France. As of 2023, the population of the commune was 147.

== See also ==
- Communes of the Hautes-Pyrénées department
