= Escala, Hautes-Pyrénées =

Escala
- Commune
- Coat of arms
- Location of Escala
- Location within France Location within Occitanie
- Coordinates: 43°05′01″N 0°24′20″E
- Country: France
- Region: Occitania
- Department: Hautes-Pyrénées
- Arrondissement: Bagnères-de-Bigorre
- Canton: Neste, Aure et Louron
- Intercommunality: Plateau de Lannemezan

Government
  - Mayor (2020–2026): Catherine Corrège
- Area^{1}: 3.88 km^{2} (1.50 sq mi)
- Elevation: 550 m (1,800 ft)
- Highest elevation: 627 m (2,057 ft)
- Lowest elevation: 506 m (1,660 ft)
- Population (2023): 347
  - Density: 89.4/km^{2} (232/sq mi)
- Time zone: UTC+01:00 (CET)
  - Summer (DST): UTC+02:00 (CEST)
- INSEE/Postal code: 65159 /65250
- ^{1} French Land Register data, which excludes lakes, ponds, glaciers > 1 km^{2} (0.386 sq mi or 247 acres) and river estuaries.

Escala (French pronunciation: [ɛskala]; Occitan: Escalar) is a commune in the Hautes-Pyrénées department in south-western France.

== See also ==
- Communes of the Hautes-Pyrénées department
