= Vielle-Louron =

- Commune
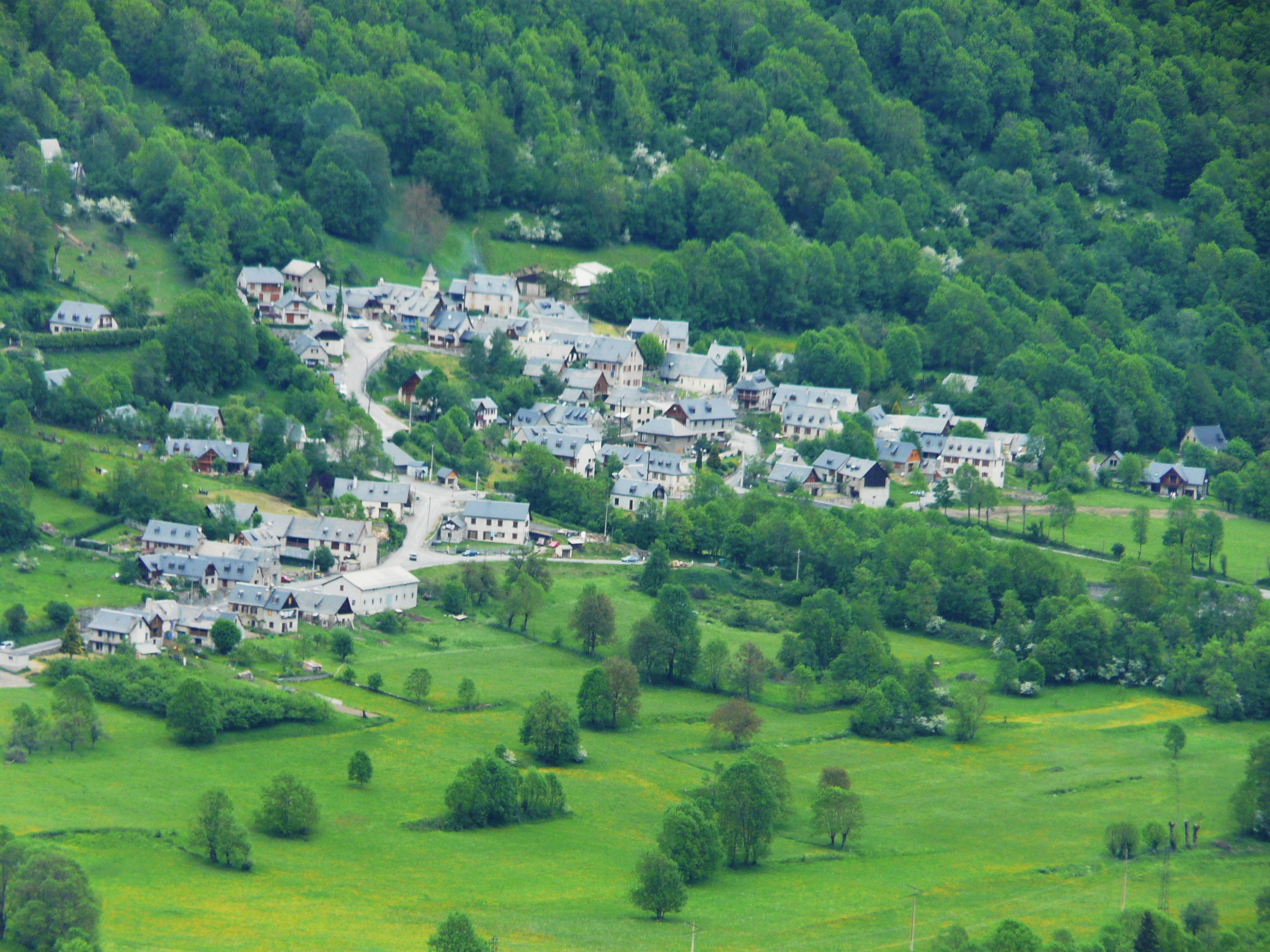
- The village of Vielle-Louron

- Coat of arms
- Location of Vielle-Louron
- Location within France Location within Occitanie
- Coordinates: 42°50′05″N 0°24′15″E
- Country: France
- Region: Occitania
- Department: Hautes-Pyrénées
- Arrondissement: Bagnères-de-Bigorre
- Canton: Neste, Aure et Louron

Government
  - Mayor (2020–2026): Victor Cascarre
- Area^{1}: 2.89 km^{2} (1.12 sq mi)
- Elevation: 948 m (3,110 ft)
- Highest elevation: 1,681 m (5,515 ft)
- Lowest elevation: 907 m (2,976 ft)
- Population (2023): 80
  - Density: 28/km^{2} (72/sq mi)
- Time zone: UTC+01:00 (CET)
  - Summer (DST): UTC+02:00 (CEST)
- INSEE/Postal code: 65466 /65240
- ^{1} French Land Register data, which excludes lakes, ponds, glaciers > 1 km^{2} (0.386 sq mi or 247 acres) and river estuaries.

Vielle-Louron (French pronunciation: [vjɛl luʁɔ̃]; Occitan: Vièla) is a commune in the Hautes-Pyrénées department in south-western France.

== See also ==
- Communes of the Hautes-Pyrénées department
