= Mont, Hautes-Pyrénées =

Mont
- Commune
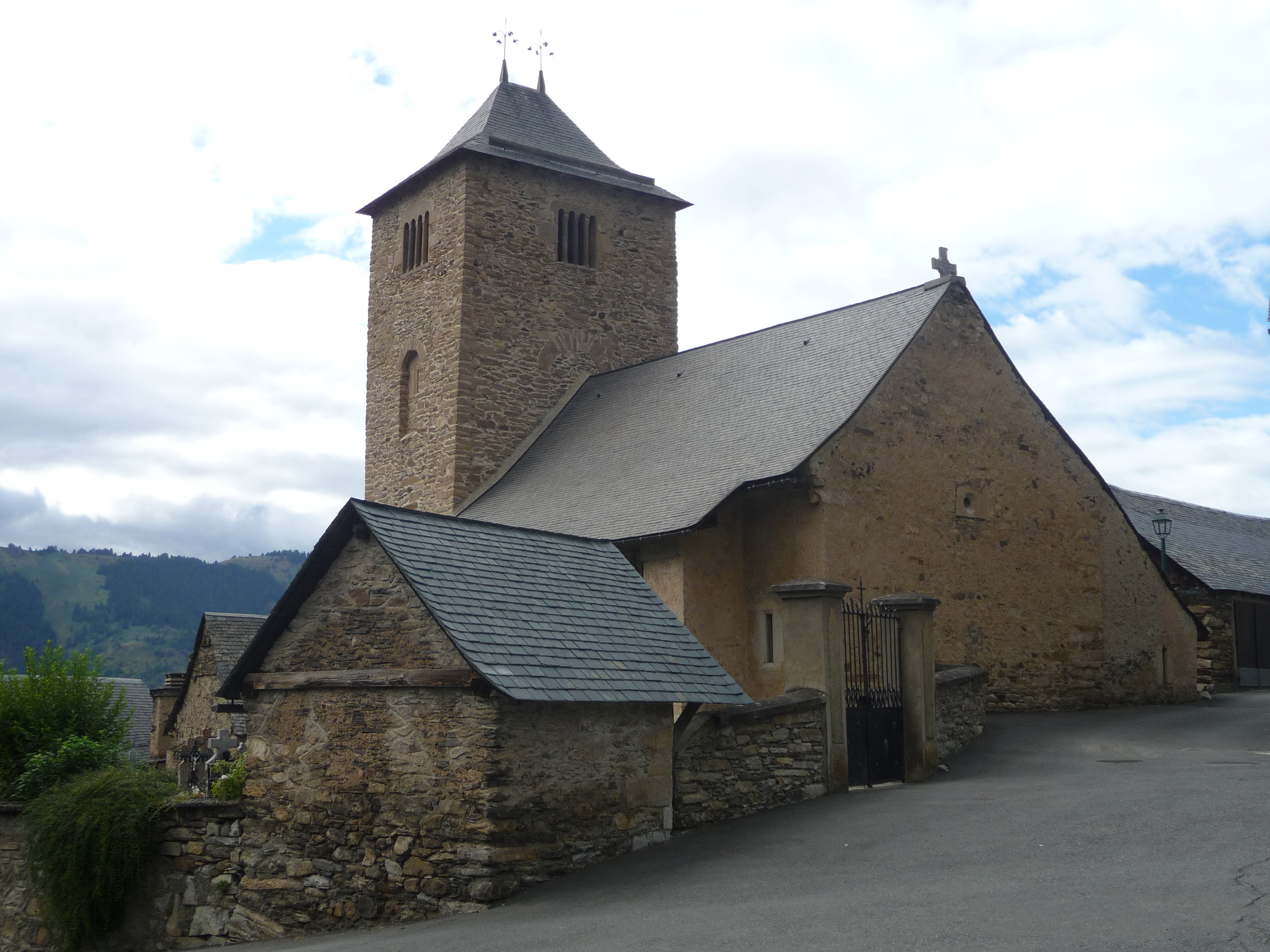
- The church of Saint-Barthelemy

- Coat of arms
- Location of Mont
- Location within France Location within Occitanie
- Coordinates: 42°49′03″N 0°25′45″E
- Country: France
- Region: Occitania
- Department: Hautes-Pyrénées
- Arrondissement: Bagnères-de-Bigorre
- Canton: Neste, Aure et Louron

Government
  - Mayor (2020–2026): Emmanuel Climent
- Area^{1}: 8.41 km^{2} (3.25 sq mi)
- Highest elevation: 2,064 m (6,772 ft)
- Lowest elevation: 1,157 m (3,796 ft)
- Population (2023): 37
  - Density: 4.4/km^{2} (11/sq mi)
- Time zone: UTC+01:00 (CET)
  - Summer (DST): UTC+02:00 (CEST)
- INSEE/Postal code: 65317 /65510
- ^{1} French Land Register data, which excludes lakes, ponds, glaciers > 1 km^{2} (0.386 sq mi or 247 acres) and river estuaries.

Mont (Occitan: Montanha) is a commune in the Hautes-Pyrénées department in south-western France.

== See also ==
- Communes of the Hautes-Pyrénées department
