= Barrancoueu =

- Commune
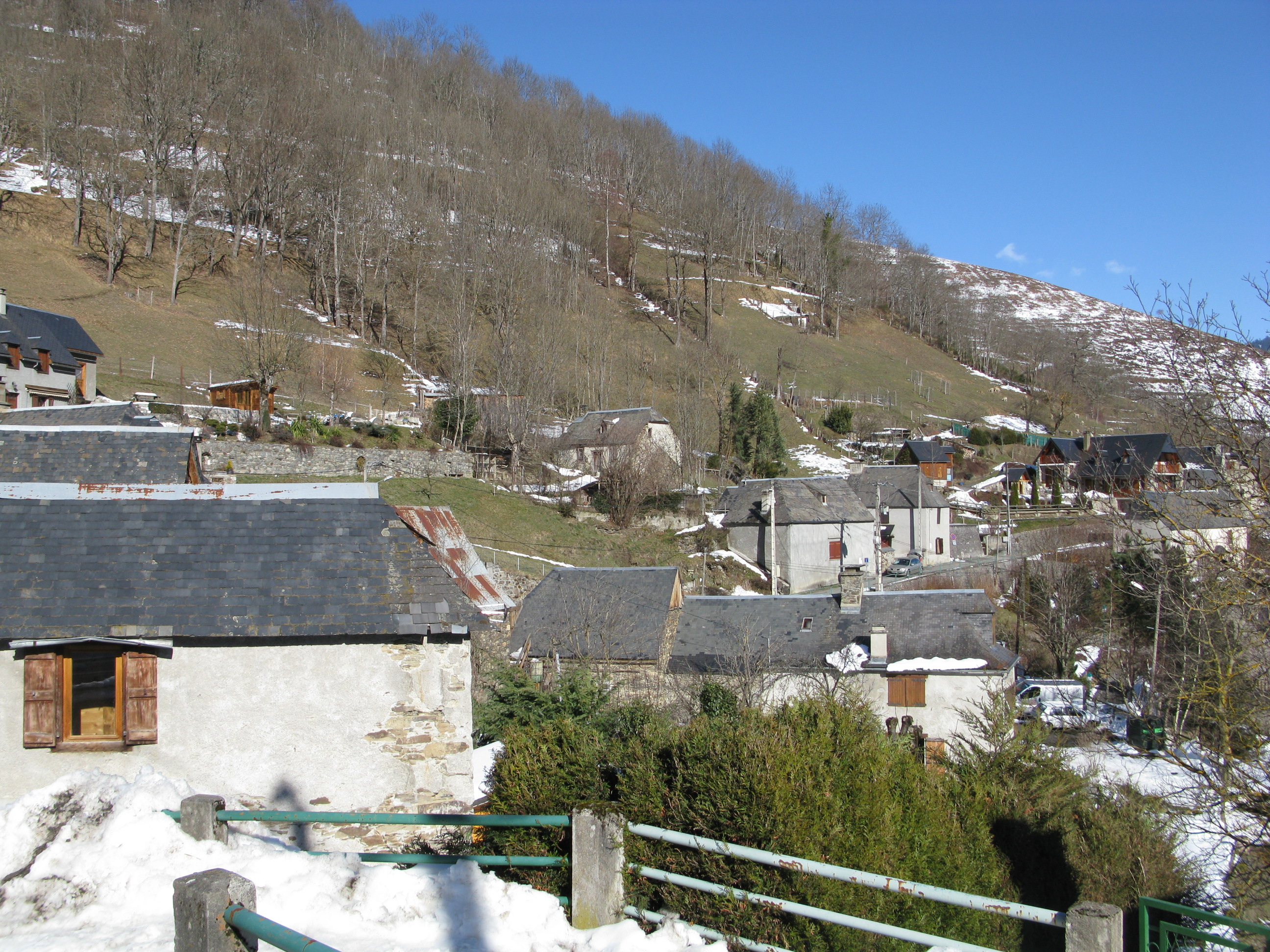
- An overall view of Barrancoueu

- Coat of arms
- Location of Barrancoueu
- Location within France Location within Occitanie
- Coordinates: 42°54′36″N 0°20′08″E
- Country: France
- Region: Occitania
- Department: Hautes-Pyrénées
- Arrondissement: Bagnères-de-Bigorre
- Canton: Neste, Aure et Louron

Government
  - Mayor (2020–2026): Marcel Saint-Pasteur
- Area^{1}: 3.8 km^{2} (1.5 sq mi)
- Elevation: 900 m (3,000 ft)
- Highest elevation: 1,691 m (5,548 ft)
- Lowest elevation: 784 m (2,572 ft)
- Population (2023): 40
  - Density: 11/km^{2} (27/sq mi)
- Time zone: UTC+01:00 (CET)
  - Summer (DST): UTC+02:00 (CEST)
- INSEE/Postal code: 65066 /65240
- ^{1} French Land Register data, which excludes lakes, ponds, glaciers > 1 km^{2} (0.386 sq mi or 247 acres) and river estuaries.

Barrancoueu (French pronunciation: [baʁɑ̃kwø]; Occitan: Barrancoèu) is a commune in the Hautes-Pyrénées department in southwestern France.

== Population ==
Historical population
Year	Pop.	±% p.a.
1968	28	—
1975	25	−1.61%
1982	21	−2.46%
1990	30	+4.56%
1999	36	+2.05%
2007	31	−1.85%
2012	33	+1.26%
2017	33	+0.00%
2023	40	+3.26%
Source: INSEE

== See also ==
- Communes of the Hautes-Pyrénées department
