= Germ, Hautes-Pyrénées =

Germ
- Commune
- Coat of arms
- Location of Germ
- Location within France Location within Occitanie
- Coordinates: 42°47′39″N 0°25′36″E
- Country: France
- Region: Occitania
- Department: Hautes-Pyrénées
- Arrondissement: Bagnères-de-Bigorre
- Canton: Neste, Aure et Louron

Government
  - Mayor (2020–2026): François Mur
- Area^{1}: 12.55 km^{2} (4.85 sq mi)
- Elevation: 1,300 m (4,300 ft)
- Highest elevation: 2,683 m (8,802 ft)
- Lowest elevation: 1,160 m (3,810 ft)
- Population (2023): 33
  - Density: 2.6/km^{2} (6.8/sq mi)
- Time zone: UTC+01:00 (CET)
  - Summer (DST): UTC+02:00 (CEST)
- INSEE/Postal code: 65199 /65510
- ^{1} French Land Register data, which excludes lakes, ponds, glaciers > 1 km^{2} (0.386 sq mi or 247 acres) and river estuaries.

Germ (French pronunciation: [ʒɛʁm]; Occitan: Gèrm) is a commune in the Hautes-Pyrénées department in south-western France.

== See also ==
- Communes of the Hautes-Pyrénées department
