= Ilhet =

- Commune
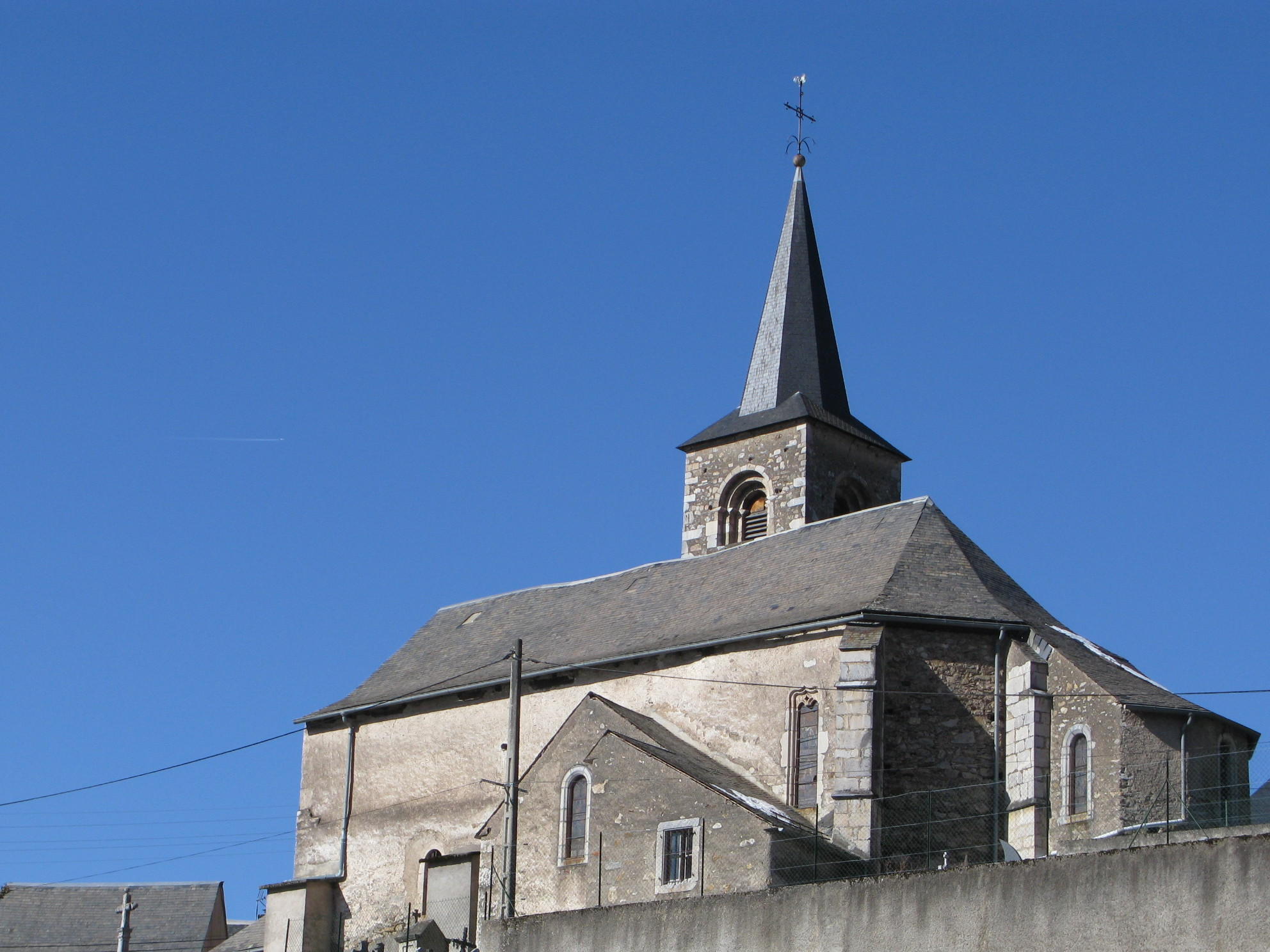
- The church

- Coat of arms
- Location of Ilhet
- Location within France Location within Occitanie
- Coordinates: 42°57′54″N 0°23′00″E
- Country: France
- Region: Occitania
- Department: Hautes-Pyrénées
- Arrondissement: Bagnères-de-Bigorre
- Canton: Neste, Aure et Louron
- Intercommunality: Aure-Louron
- Area^{1}: 8.02 km^{2} (3.10 sq mi)
- Elevation: 634 m (2,080 ft)
- Highest elevation: 1,520 m (4,990 ft)
- Lowest elevation: 634 m (2,080 ft)
- Population (2023): 122
  - Density: 15.2/km^{2} (39.4/sq mi)
- Time zone: UTC+01:00 (CET)
  - Summer (DST): UTC+02:00 (CEST)
- INSEE/Postal code: 65228 /65410
- ^{1} French Land Register data, which excludes lakes, ponds, glaciers > 1 km^{2} (0.386 sq mi or 247 acres) and river estuaries.

Ilhet is a commune in the Hautes-Pyrénées department in south-western France.

== See also ==
- Communes of the Hautes-Pyrénées department
