= Fréchet-Aure =

- Commune
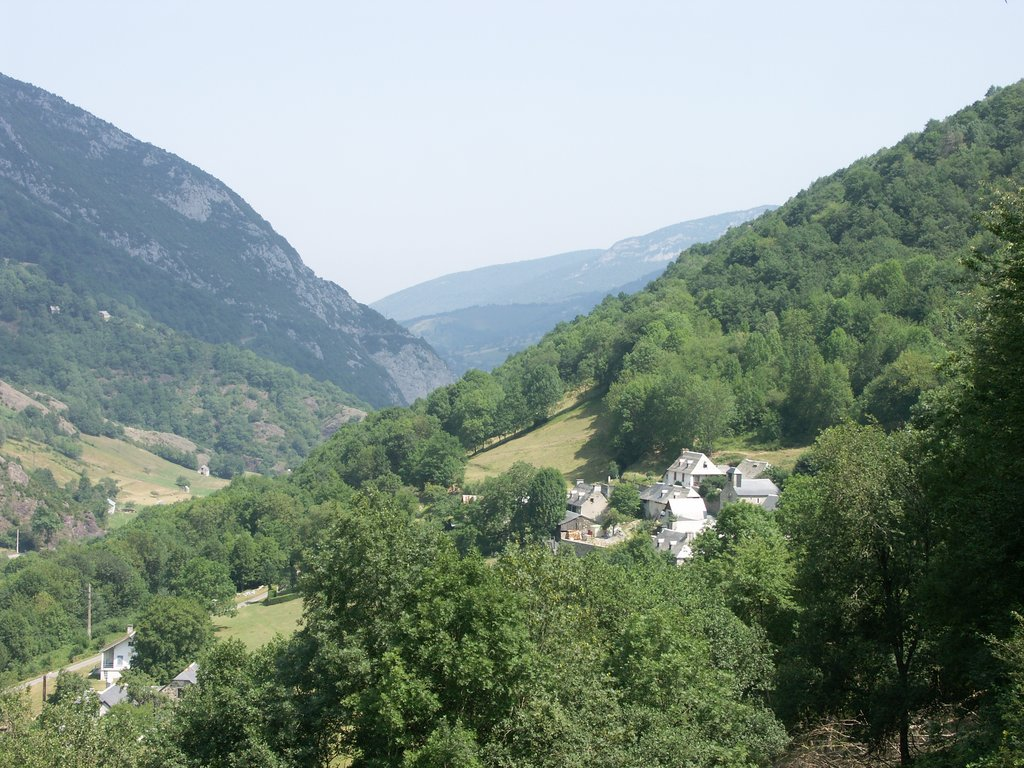
- View of Fréchet-Aure

- Coat of arms
- Location of Fréchet-Aure
- Location within France Location within Occitanie
- Coordinates: 42°55′55″N 0°22′19″E
- Country: France
- Region: Occitania
- Department: Hautes-Pyrénées
- Arrondissement: Bagnères-de-Bigorre
- Canton: Neste, Aure et Louron
- Intercommunality: Aure Louron

Government
  - Mayor (2020–2026): Marie-José Rodriguez
- Area^{1}: 3.4 km^{2} (1.3 sq mi)
- Elevation: 672 m (2,205 ft)
- Highest elevation: 1,450 m (4,760 ft)
- Lowest elevation: 655 m (2,149 ft)
- Population (2023): 16
  - Density: 4.7/km^{2} (12/sq mi)
- Time zone: UTC+01:00 (CET)
  - Summer (DST): UTC+02:00 (CEST)
- INSEE/Postal code: 65180 /65240
- ^{1} French Land Register data, which excludes lakes, ponds, glaciers > 1 km^{2} (0.386 sq mi or 247 acres) and river estuaries.

Fréchet-Aure is a commune in the Hautes-Pyrénées department in south-western France.

== Population ==
Historical population
Year	Pop.	±% p.a.
1968	15	—
1975	7	−10.32%
1982	10	+5.23%
1990	15	+5.20%
1999	10	−4.41%
2007	13	+3.33%
2012	13	+0.00%
2017	12	−1.59%
2023	16	+4.91%
Source: INSEE

== See also ==
- Communes of the Hautes-Pyrénées department
