= Aulon, Hautes-Pyrénées =

Aulon
- Commune
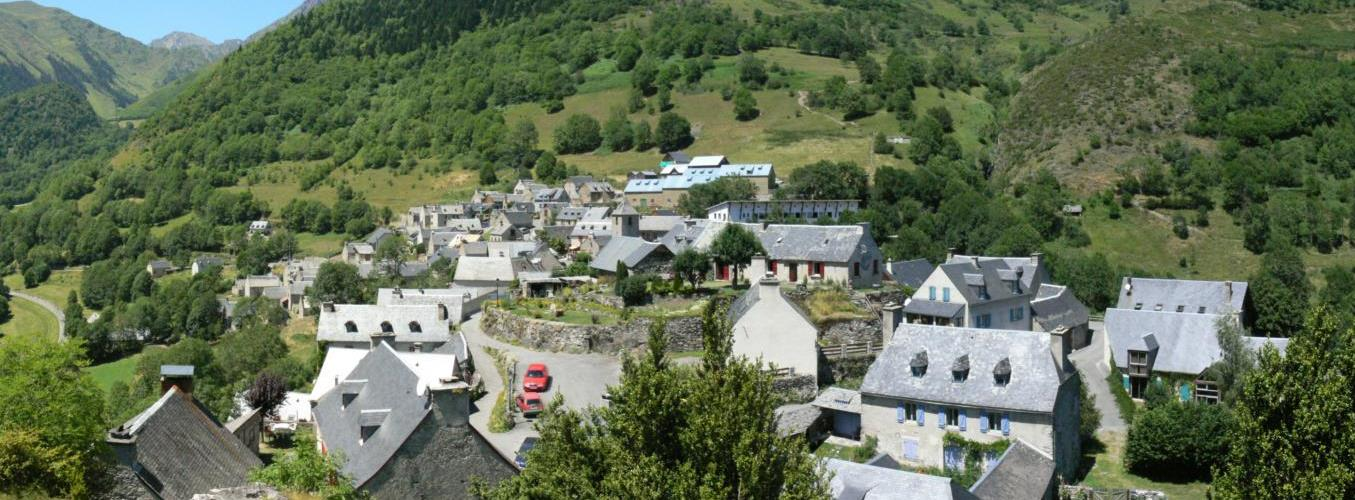
- An overall view of the village of Aulon in the Hautes-Pyrénées.

- Coat of arms
- Location of Aulon
- Location within France Location within Occitanie
- Coordinates: 42°51′07″N 0°17′47″E
- Country: France
- Region: Occitania
- Department: Hautes-Pyrénées
- Arrondissement: Bagnères-de-Bigorre
- Canton: Neste, Aure et Louron
- Intercommunality: CC Aure Louron

Government
  - Mayor (2020–2026): Jean-Bertrand Dubarry
- Area^{1}: 28.84 km^{2} (11.14 sq mi)
- Elevation: 1,227 m (4,026 ft)
- Highest elevation: 2,843 m (9,327 ft)
- Lowest elevation: 1,061 m (3,481 ft)
- Population (2023): 99
  - Density: 3.4/km^{2} (8.9/sq mi)
- Time zone: UTC+01:00 (CET)
  - Summer (DST): UTC+02:00 (CEST)
- INSEE/Postal code: 65046 /65440
- ^{1} French Land Register data, which excludes lakes, ponds, glaciers > 1 km^{2} (0.386 sq mi or 247 acres) and river estuaries.

Aulon (French pronunciation: [olɔ̃]) is a commune in the Hautes-Pyrénées department in southwestern France.

== Population ==
Historical population
Year	Pop.	±% p.a.
1968	68	—
1975	66	−0.43%
1982	60	−1.35%
1990	80	+3.66%
1999	84	+0.54%
2007	76	−1.24%
2012	80	+1.03%
2017	84	+0.98%
2023	99	+2.78%
Source: INSEE

== See also ==
- Communes of the Hautes-Pyrénées department
