= Sailhan =

- Commune
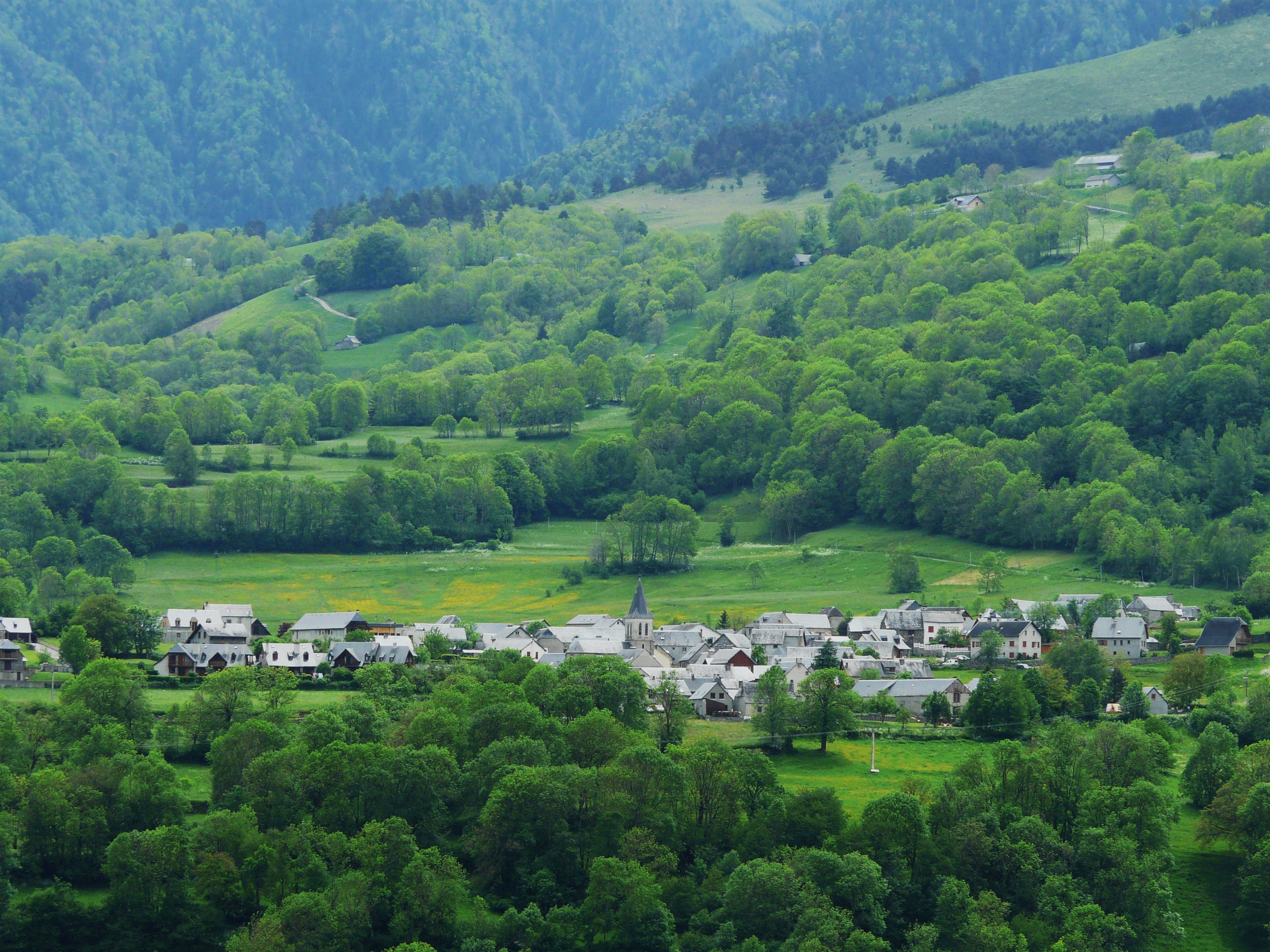
- The village of Sailhan

- Coat of arms
- Location of Sailhan
- Location within France Location within Occitanie
- Coordinates: 42°49′12″N 0°20′06″E
- Country: France
- Region: Occitania
- Department: Hautes-Pyrénées
- Arrondissement: Bagnères-de-Bigorre
- Canton: Neste, Aure et Louron
- Intercommunality: Aure-Louron

Government
  - Mayor (2020–2026): Didier Brun
- Area^{1}: 2.64 km^{2} (1.02 sq mi)
- Elevation: 1,100 m (3,600 ft)
- Highest elevation: 2,067 m (6,781 ft)
- Lowest elevation: 827 m (2,713 ft)
- Population (2023): 172
  - Density: 65.2/km^{2} (169/sq mi)
- Time zone: UTC+01:00 (CET)
  - Summer (DST): UTC+02:00 (CEST)
- INSEE/Postal code: 65384 /65170
- ^{1} French Land Register data, which excludes lakes, ponds, glaciers > 1 km^{2} (0.386 sq mi or 247 acres) and river estuaries.

Sailhan (French pronunciation: [sajɑ̃]; Occitan: Salhan) is a commune in the Hautes-Pyrénées department in south-western France.

== See also ==
- Communes of the Hautes-Pyrénées department
