= Hèches =

- Commune
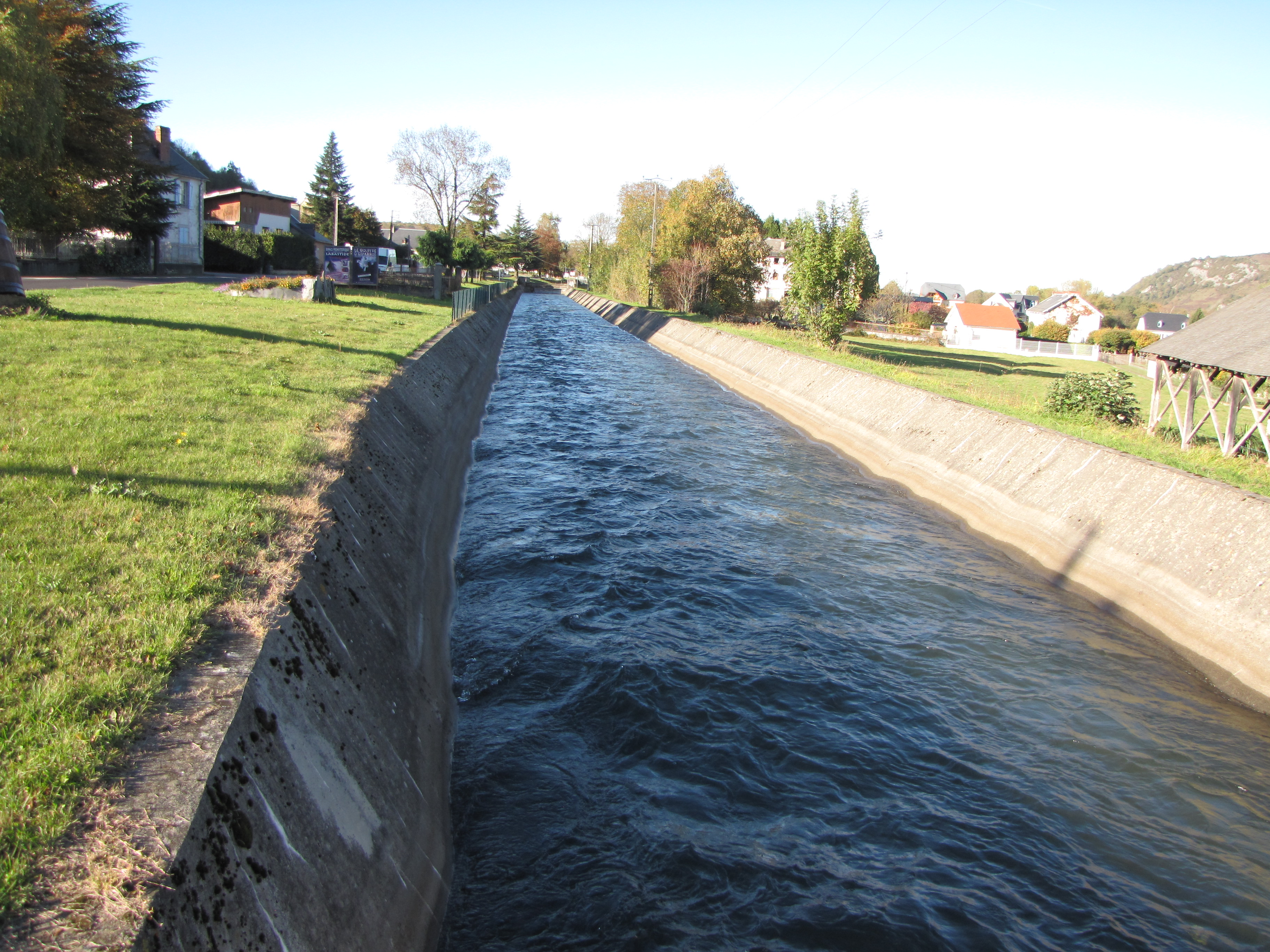
- The Canal de la Neste at Hèches

- Coat of arms
- Location of Hèches
- Location within France Location within Occitanie
- Coordinates: 43°01′03″N 0°22′23″E
- Country: France
- Region: Occitania
- Department: Hautes-Pyrénées
- Arrondissement: Bagnères-de-Bigorre
- Canton: Neste, Aure et Louron
- Intercommunality: Plateau de Lannemezan

Government
  - Mayor (2020–2026): Patricia Corrège
- Area^{1}: 35.44 km^{2} (13.68 sq mi)
- Elevation: 610 m (2,000 ft)
- Highest elevation: 1,903 m (6,243 ft)
- Lowest elevation: 564 m (1,850 ft)
- Population (2023): 577
  - Density: 16.3/km^{2} (42.2/sq mi)
- Time zone: UTC+01:00 (CET)
  - Summer (DST): UTC+02:00 (CEST)
- INSEE/Postal code: 65218 /65250
- ^{1} French Land Register data, which excludes lakes, ponds, glaciers > 1 km^{2} (0.386 sq mi or 247 acres) and river estuaries.

Hèches (French pronunciation: [ɛʃ]; Occitan: Hèishas) is a commune in the Hautes-Pyrénées department of South-Western France.

== See also ==
- Communes of the Hautes-Pyrénées department
