= Mazouau =

- Commune
- Coat of arms
- Location of Mazouau
- Location within France Location within Occitanie
- Coordinates: 43°02′04″N 0°24′01″E
- Country: France
- Region: Occitania
- Department: Hautes-Pyrénées
- Arrondissement: Bagnères-de-Bigorre
- Canton: Neste, Aure et Louron
- Intercommunality: Plateau de Lannemezan

Government
  - Mayor (2020–2026): Joëlle Vigneaux
- Area^{1}: 1.4 km^{2} (0.54 sq mi)
- Elevation: 570 m (1,870 ft)
- Highest elevation: 1,211 m (3,973 ft)
- Lowest elevation: 540 m (1,770 ft)
- Population (2023): 13
  - Density: 9.3/km^{2} (24/sq mi)
- Time zone: UTC+01:00 (CET)
  - Summer (DST): UTC+02:00 (CEST)
- INSEE/Postal code: 65309 /65250
- ^{1} French Land Register data, which excludes lakes, ponds, glaciers > 1 km^{2} (0.386 sq mi or 247 acres) and river estuaries.

Mazouau (French pronunciation: [mazwo]; Occitan: Masoau) is a commune in the Hautes-Pyrénées department in south-western France.

== See also ==
- Communes of the Hautes-Pyrénées department
