= Ens, Hautes-Pyrénées =

Ens
- Commune
- Coat of arms
- Location of Ens
- Location within France Location within Occitanie
- Coordinates: 42°48′26″N 0°20′26″E
- Country: France
- Region: Occitania
- Department: Hautes-Pyrénées
- Arrondissement: Bagnères-de-Bigorre
- Canton: Neste, Aure et Louron
- Intercommunality: Aure-Louron
- Area^{1}: 3.49 km^{2} (1.35 sq mi)
- Elevation: 1,100 m (3,600 ft)
- Highest elevation: 2,204 m (7,231 ft)
- Lowest elevation: 1,126 m (3,694 ft)
- Population (2023): 28
  - Density: 8.0/km^{2} (21/sq mi)
- Time zone: UTC+01:00 (CET)
  - Summer (DST): UTC+02:00 (CEST)
- INSEE/Postal code: 65157 /65170
- ^{1} French Land Register data, which excludes lakes, ponds, glaciers > 1 km^{2} (0.386 sq mi or 247 acres) and river estuaries.

Ens is a commune in the Hautes-Pyrénées department in south-western France.

== See also ==
- Communes of the Hautes-Pyrénées department
