= Canton of Neste, Aure et Louron =

Coordinates: 43.10°N 0.32°E

The canton of Neste, Aure et Louron is an administrative division of the Hautes-Pyrénées department, southwestern France. It was created at the French canton reorganisation which came into effect in March 2015. Its seat is in Capvern.

It consists of the following communes:

1. Adervielle-Pouchergues
2. Ancizan
3. Aragnouet
4. Ardengost
5. Arreau
6. Aspin-Aure
7. Aulon
8. Avajan
9. Avezac-Prat-Lahitte
10. Azet
11. Bareilles
12. Barrancoueu
13. La Barthe-de-Neste
14. Bazus-Aure
15. Bazus-Neste
16. Beyrède-Jumet-Camous
17. Bordères-Louron
18. Bourisp
19. Cadéac
20. Cadeilhan-Trachère
21. Camparan
22. Capvern
23. Cazaux-Debat
24. Cazaux-Fréchet-Anéran-Camors
25. Ens
26. Escala
27. Esparros
28. Estarvielle
29. Estensan
30. Fréchet-Aure
31. Gazave
32. Génos
33. Germ
34. Gouaux
35. Grailhen
36. Grézian
37. Guchan
38. Guchen
39. Hèches
40. Ilhet
41. Izaux
42. Jézeau
43. Labastide
44. Laborde
45. Lançon
46. Lortet
47. Loudenvielle
48. Loudervielle
49. Mazouau
50. Mont
51. Montoussé
52. Pailhac
53. Ris
54. Sailhan
55. Saint-Arroman
56. Saint-Lary-Soulan
57. Sarrancolin
58. Tramezaïgues
59. Vielle-Aure
60. Vielle-Louron
61. Vignec
