= Guchan =

- Commune
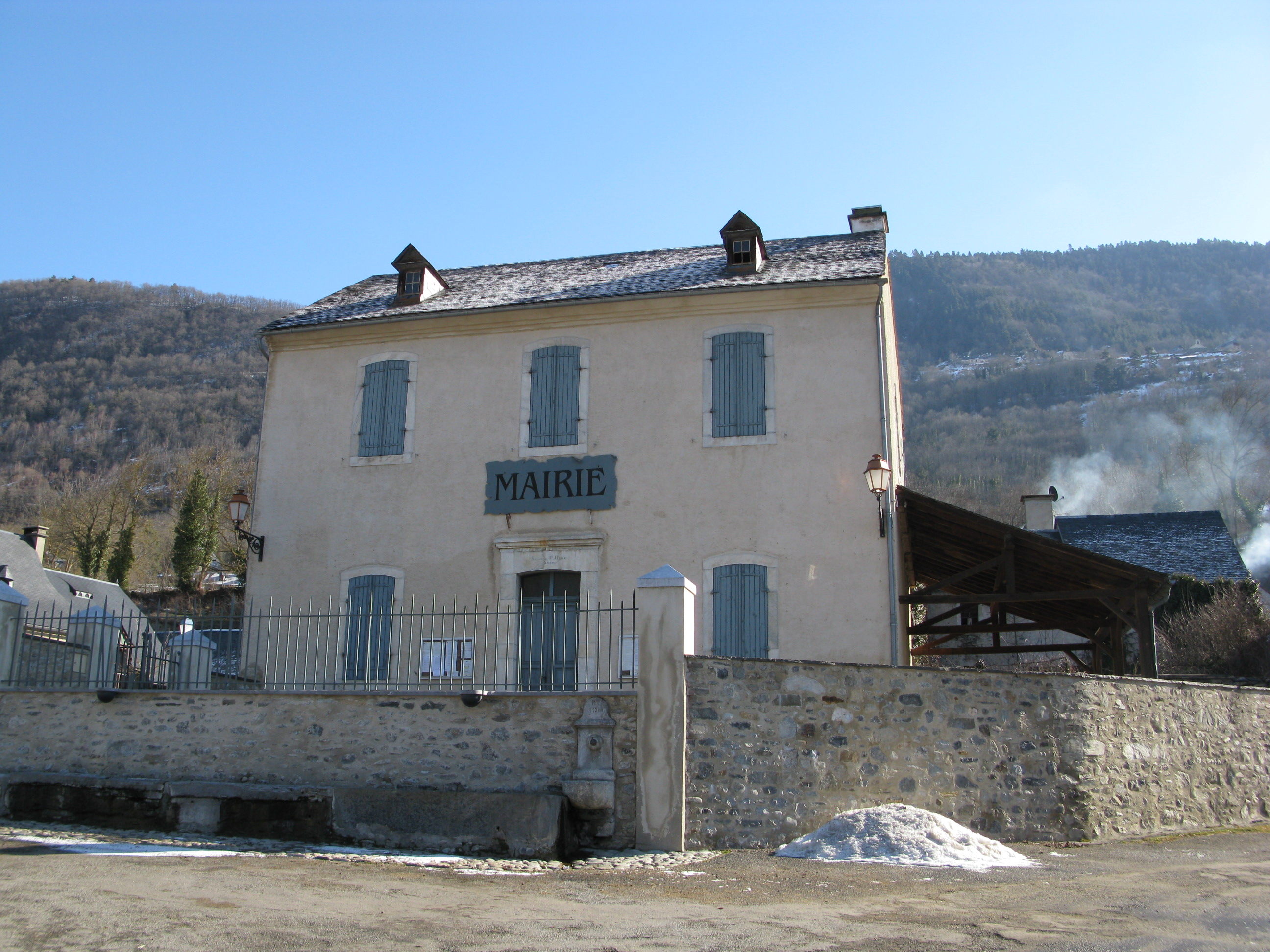
- The town hall

- Coat of arms
- Location of Guchan
- Location within France Location within Occitanie
- Coordinates: 42°50′54″N 0°21′02″E
- Country: France
- Region: Occitania
- Department: Hautes-Pyrénées
- Arrondissement: Bagnères-de-Bigorre
- Canton: Neste, Aure et Louron
- Intercommunality: Aure-Louron

Government
  - Mayor (2020–2026): Alain Rivière
- Area^{1}: 2.59 km^{2} (1.00 sq mi)
- Elevation: 734 m (2,408 ft)
- Highest elevation: 1,526 m (5,007 ft)
- Lowest elevation: 761 m (2,497 ft)
- Population (2023): 151
  - Density: 58.3/km^{2} (151/sq mi)
- Time zone: UTC+01:00 (CET)
  - Summer (DST): UTC+02:00 (CEST)
- INSEE/Postal code: 65211 /65170
- ^{1} French Land Register data, which excludes lakes, ponds, glaciers > 1 km^{2} (0.386 sq mi or 247 acres) and river estuaries.

Guchan (French pronunciation: [ɡyʃɑ̃]; Occitan: Gusha) is a commune in the Hautes-Pyrénées department in south-western France.

== See also ==
- Communes of the Hautes-Pyrénées department
