= Esparros =

- Commune
- Coat of arms
- Location of Esparros
- Location within France Location within Occitanie
- Coordinates: 43°01′58″N 0°19′18″E
- Country: France
- Region: Occitania
- Department: Hautes-Pyrénées
- Arrondissement: Bagnères-de-Bigorre
- Canton: Neste, Aure et Louron
- Intercommunality: Plateau de Lannemezan

Government
  - Mayor (2020–2026): Jean-Marie Duthu
- Area^{1}: 32.56 km^{2} (12.57 sq mi)
- Elevation: 420 m (1,380 ft)
- Highest elevation: 1,924 m (6,312 ft)
- Lowest elevation: 439 m (1,440 ft)
- Population (2023): 165
  - Density: 5.07/km^{2} (13.1/sq mi)
- Time zone: UTC+01:00 (CET)
  - Summer (DST): UTC+02:00 (CEST)
- INSEE/Postal code: 65165 /65130
- ^{1} French Land Register data, which excludes lakes, ponds, glaciers > 1 km^{2} (0.386 sq mi or 247 acres) and river estuaries.

Esparros (French pronunciation: [ɛspaʁɔs]; Occitan: Esparròs) is a commune in the Hautes-Pyrénées department in south-western France.

== See also ==
- Communes of the Hautes-Pyrénées department
