= Laborde, Hautes-Pyrénées =

Laborde
- Commune
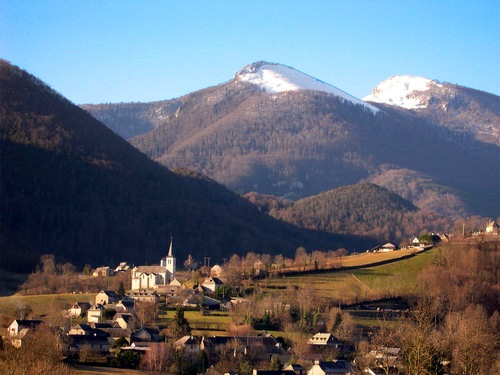
- A view of Laborde

- Coat of arms
- Location of Laborde
- Location within France Location within Occitanie
- Coordinates: 43°02′03″N 0°18′02″E
- Country: France
- Region: Occitania
- Department: Hautes-Pyrénées
- Arrondissement: Bagnères-de-Bigorre
- Canton: Neste, Aure et Louron
- Intercommunality: Plateau de Lannemezan

Government
  - Mayor (2020–2026): Geneviève Pflimlin
- Area^{1}: 1.82 km^{2} (0.70 sq mi)
- Elevation: 480 m (1,570 ft)
- Highest elevation: 610 m (2,000 ft)
- Lowest elevation: 416 m (1,365 ft)
- Population (2023): 83
  - Density: 46/km^{2} (120/sq mi)
- Time zone: UTC+01:00 (CET)
  - Summer (DST): UTC+02:00 (CEST)
- INSEE/Postal code: 65241 /65130
- ^{1} French Land Register data, which excludes lakes, ponds, glaciers > 1 km^{2} (0.386 sq mi or 247 acres) and river estuaries.

Laborde (French pronunciation: [labɔʁd]; Occitan: Era Bòrda) is a commune in the Hautes-Pyrénées department in south-western France.

== See also ==
- Communes of the Hautes-Pyrénées department
