= Jézeau =

- Commune
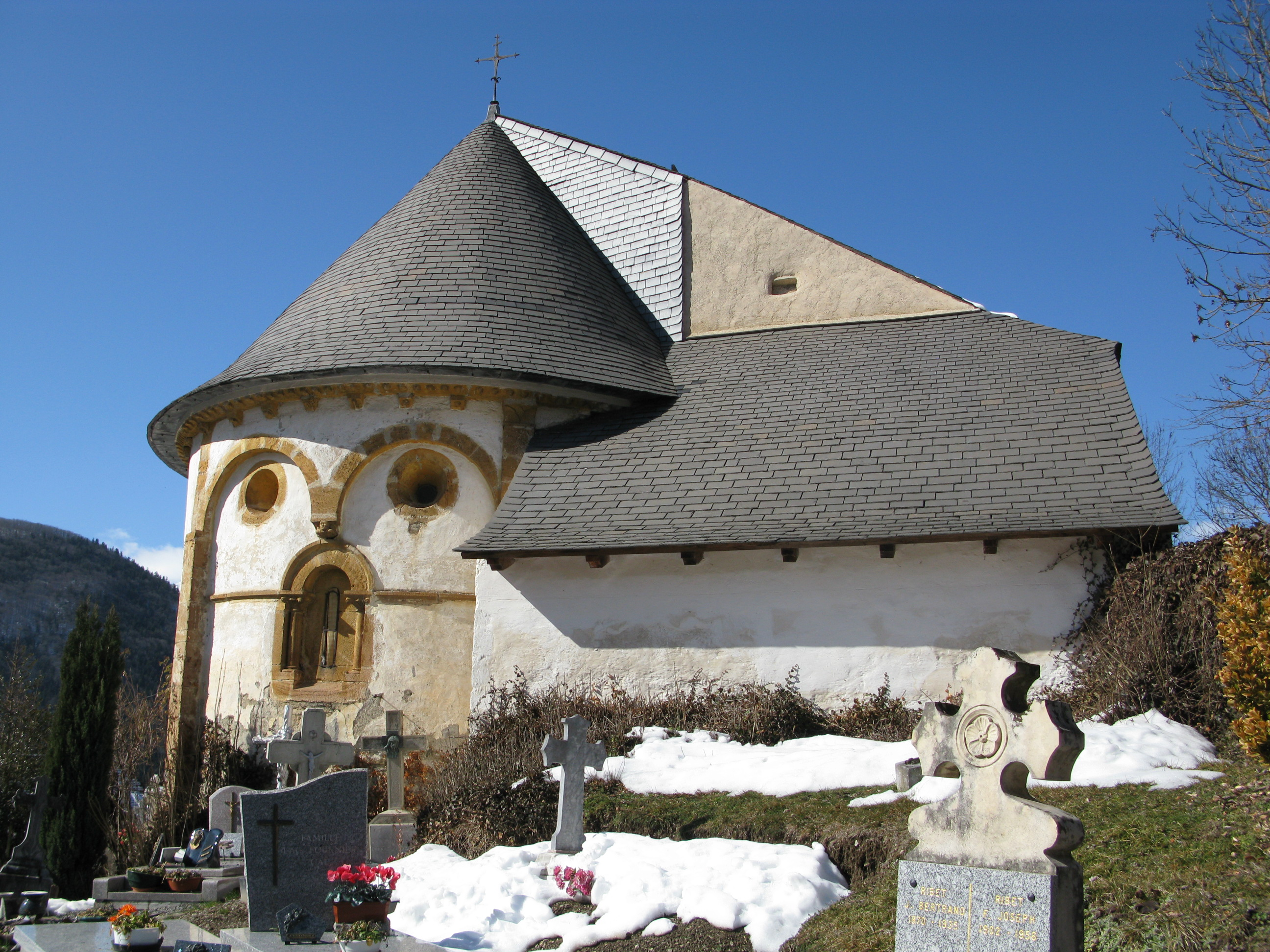
- The church of Jézeau

- Coat of arms
- Location of Jézeau
- Location within France Location within Occitanie
- Coordinates: 42°54′06″N 0°22′55″E
- Country: France
- Region: Occitania
- Department: Hautes-Pyrénées
- Arrondissement: Bagnères-de-Bigorre
- Canton: Neste, Aure et Louron
- Intercommunality: Aure-Louron

Government
  - Mayor (2020–2026): Patrice Balagna
- Area^{1}: 12.2 km^{2} (4.7 sq mi)
- Elevation: 900 m (3,000 ft)
- Highest elevation: 2,079 m (6,821 ft)
- Lowest elevation: 726 m (2,382 ft)
- Population (2023): 108
  - Density: 8.85/km^{2} (22.9/sq mi)
- Time zone: UTC+01:00 (CET)
  - Summer (DST): UTC+02:00 (CEST)
- INSEE/Postal code: 65234 /65240
- ^{1} French Land Register data, which excludes lakes, ponds, glaciers > 1 km^{2} (0.386 sq mi or 247 acres) and river estuaries.

Jézeau (French pronunciation: [ʒezo]; Occitan: Gèdeu) is a commune in the Hautes-Pyrénées department in south-western France.

== See also ==
- Communes of the Hautes-Pyrénées department
