= Estarvielle =

Commune in France

- Commune
- Coat of arms
- Location of Estarvielle
- Location within France Location within Occitanie
- Coordinates: 42°49′15″N 0°24′58″E
- Country: France
- Region: Occitania
- Department: Hautes-Pyrénées
- Arrondissement: Bagnères-de-Bigorre
- Canton: Neste, Aure et Louron

Government
  - Mayor (2020–2026): Henri Armanet
- Area^{1}: 0.8 km^{2} (0.31 sq mi)
- Elevation: 994 m (3,261 ft)
- Highest elevation: 1,168 m (3,832 ft)
- Lowest elevation: 923 m (3,028 ft)
- Population (2023): 30
  - Density: 38/km^{2} (97/sq mi)
- Time zone: UTC+01:00 (CET)
  - Summer (DST): UTC+02:00 (CEST)
- INSEE/Postal code: 65171 /65510
- ^{1} French Land Register data, which excludes lakes, ponds, glaciers > 1 km^{2} (0.386 sq mi or 247 acres) and river estuaries.

Estarvielle (French pronunciation: [ɛstaʁvjɛl]; Occitan: Estarvièla) is a commune in the Hautes-Pyrénées department in south-western France.

== See also ==
- Communes of the Hautes-Pyrénées department
