= Camparan =

- Commune
- Coat of arms
- Location of Camparan
- Location within France Location within Occitanie
- Coordinates: 42°50′20″N 0°21′21″E
- Country: France
- Region: Occitania
- Department: Hautes-Pyrénées
- Arrondissement: Bagnères-de-Bigorre
- Canton: Neste, Aure et Louron
- Intercommunality: Aure-Louron

Government
  - Mayor (2020–2026): Frédéric Fines
- Area^{1}: 2.35 km^{2} (0.91 sq mi)
- Elevation: 960 m (3,150 ft)
- Highest elevation: 1,620 m (5,310 ft)
- Lowest elevation: 790 m (2,590 ft)
- Population (2023): 51
  - Density: 22/km^{2} (56/sq mi)
- Time zone: UTC+01:00 (CET)
  - Summer (DST): UTC+02:00 (CEST)
- INSEE/Postal code: 65124 /65170
- ^{1} French Land Register data, which excludes lakes, ponds, glaciers > 1 km^{2} (0.386 sq mi or 247 acres) and river estuaries.

Camparan (French pronunciation: [kɑ̃paʁɑ̃]) is a commune in the Hautes-Pyrénées department in south-western France.

== See also ==
- Communes of the Hautes-Pyrénées department
