= Grailhen =

- Commune
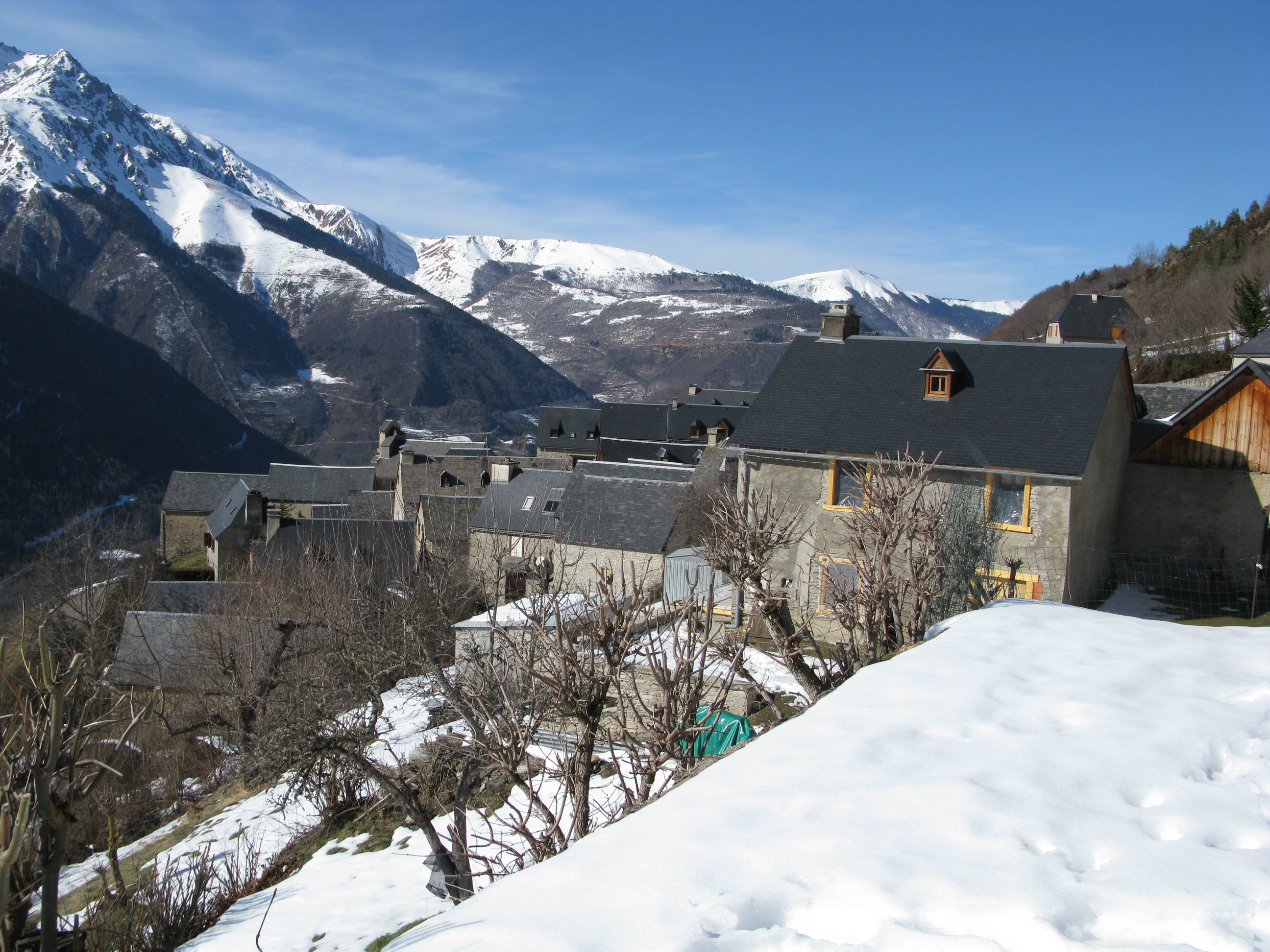
- A view of the village

- Coat of arms
- Location of Grailhen
- Location within France Location within Occitanie
- Coordinates: 42°50′51″N 0°21′44″E
- Country: France
- Region: Occitania
- Department: Hautes-Pyrénées
- Arrondissement: Bagnères-de-Bigorre
- Canton: Neste, Aure et Louron
- Intercommunality: Aure-Louron
- Area^{1}: 6.06 km^{2} (2.34 sq mi)
- Elevation: 1,110 m (3,640 ft)
- Highest elevation: 1,728 m (5,669 ft)
- Lowest elevation: 1,000 m (3,300 ft)
- Population (2023): 22
  - Density: 3.6/km^{2} (9.4/sq mi)
- Time zone: UTC+01:00 (CET)
  - Summer (DST): UTC+02:00 (CEST)
- INSEE/Postal code: 65208 /65170
- ^{1} French Land Register data, which excludes lakes, ponds, glaciers > 1 km^{2} (0.386 sq mi or 247 acres) and river estuaries.

Grailhen is a commune in the Hautes-Pyrénées department in south-western France.

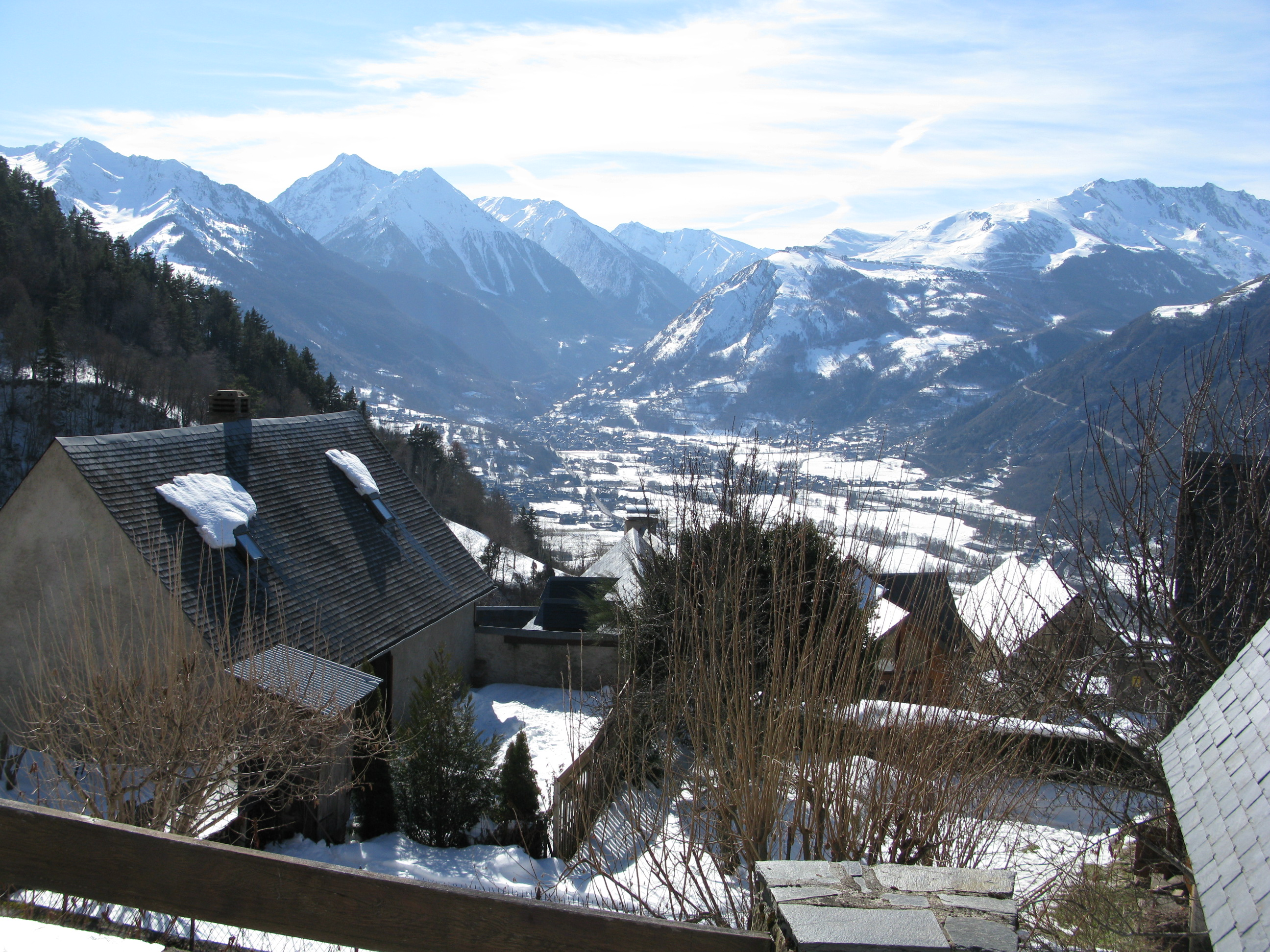
A view of the valley.

== See also ==
- Communes of the Hautes-Pyrénées department
