= Lortet =

- Commune
- Coat of arms
- Location of Lortet
- Location within France Location within Occitanie
- Coordinates: 43°02′38″N 0°22′48″E
- Country: France
- Region: Occitania
- Department: Hautes-Pyrénées
- Arrondissement: Bagnères-de-Bigorre
- Canton: Neste, Aure et Louron
- Intercommunality: Plateau de Lannemezan

Government
  - Mayor (2020–2026): Chrystelle Maupas
- Area^{1}: 3.63 km^{2} (1.40 sq mi)
- Elevation: 624 m (2,047 ft)
- Highest elevation: 809 m (2,654 ft)
- Lowest elevation: 545 m (1,788 ft)
- Population (2023): 210
  - Density: 58/km^{2} (150/sq mi)
- Time zone: UTC+01:00 (CET)
  - Summer (DST): UTC+02:00 (CEST)
- INSEE/Postal code: 65279 /65250
- ^{1} French Land Register data, which excludes lakes, ponds, glaciers > 1 km^{2} (0.386 sq mi or 247 acres) and river estuaries.

Lortet (French pronunciation: [lɔʁtɛ]; Occitan: Lortèth) is a commune in the Hautes-Pyrénées department in south-western France.

== See also ==
- Communes of the Hautes-Pyrénées department
