= Montoussé =

- Commune
- Coat of arms
- Location of Montoussé
- Location within France Location within Occitanie
- Coordinates: 43°04′03″N 0°24′56″E
- Country: France
- Region: Occitania
- Department: Hautes-Pyrénées
- Arrondissement: Bagnères-de-Bigorre
- Canton: Neste, Aure et Louron
- Intercommunality: Plateau de Lannemezan

Government
  - Mayor (2020–2026): Christiane Rotgé
- Area^{1}: 7.88 km^{2} (3.04 sq mi)
- Elevation: 600 m (2,000 ft)
- Highest elevation: 688 m (2,257 ft)
- Lowest elevation: 496 m (1,627 ft)
- Population (2023): 250
  - Density: 32/km^{2} (82/sq mi)
- Time zone: UTC+01:00 (CET)
  - Summer (DST): UTC+02:00 (CEST)
- INSEE/Postal code: 65322 /65250
- ^{1} French Land Register data, which excludes lakes, ponds, glaciers > 1 km^{2} (0.386 sq mi or 247 acres) and river estuaries.

Montoussé (French pronunciation: [mɔ̃tuse]; Occitan: Montossèr) is a commune in the Hautes-Pyrénées department in south-western France.

== See also ==
- Communes of the Hautes-Pyrénées department
