= Bareilles =

- Commune
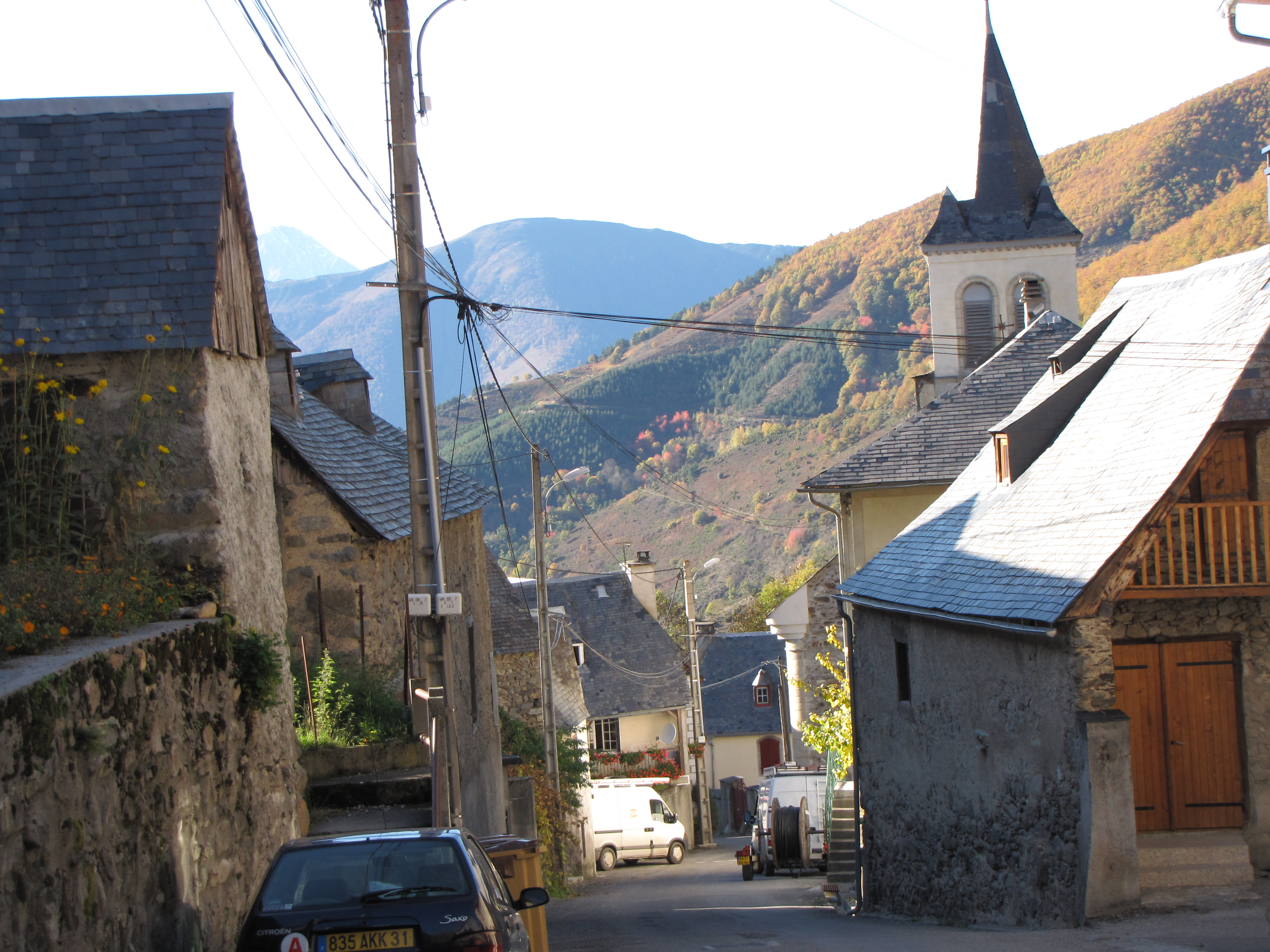
- The village of Bareilles

- Coat of arms
- Location of Bareilles
- Location within France Location within Occitanie
- Coordinates: 42°53′51″N 0°25′29″E
- Country: France
- Region: Occitania
- Department: Hautes-Pyrénées
- Arrondissement: Bagnères-de-Bigorre
- Canton: Neste, Aure et Louron

Government
  - Mayor (2020–2026): Jocelyne Vidaillet
- Area^{1}: 20.84 km^{2} (8.05 sq mi)
- Elevation: 1,000 m (3,300 ft)
- Highest elevation: 2,150 m (7,050 ft)
- Lowest elevation: 823 m (2,700 ft)
- Population (2023): 39
  - Density: 1.9/km^{2} (4.8/sq mi)
- Time zone: UTC+01:00 (CET)
  - Summer (DST): UTC+02:00 (CEST)
- INSEE/Postal code: 65064 /65240
- ^{1} French Land Register data, which excludes lakes, ponds, glaciers > 1 km^{2} (0.386 sq mi or 247 acres) and river estuaries.

Bareilles (French pronunciation: [baʁɛj]; Occitan: Era Varelha) is a commune in the Hautes-Pyrénées department in southwestern France.

== Population ==
Historical population
Year	Pop.	±% p.a.
1968	102	—
1975	80	−3.41%
1982	69	−2.09%
1990	57	−2.36%
1999	67	+1.81%
2007	63	−0.77%
2012	59	−1.30%
2017	47	−4.45%
2023	39	−3.06%
Source: INSEE

== See also ==
- Communes of the Hautes-Pyrénées department
