= Avezac-Prat-Lahitte =

- Commune
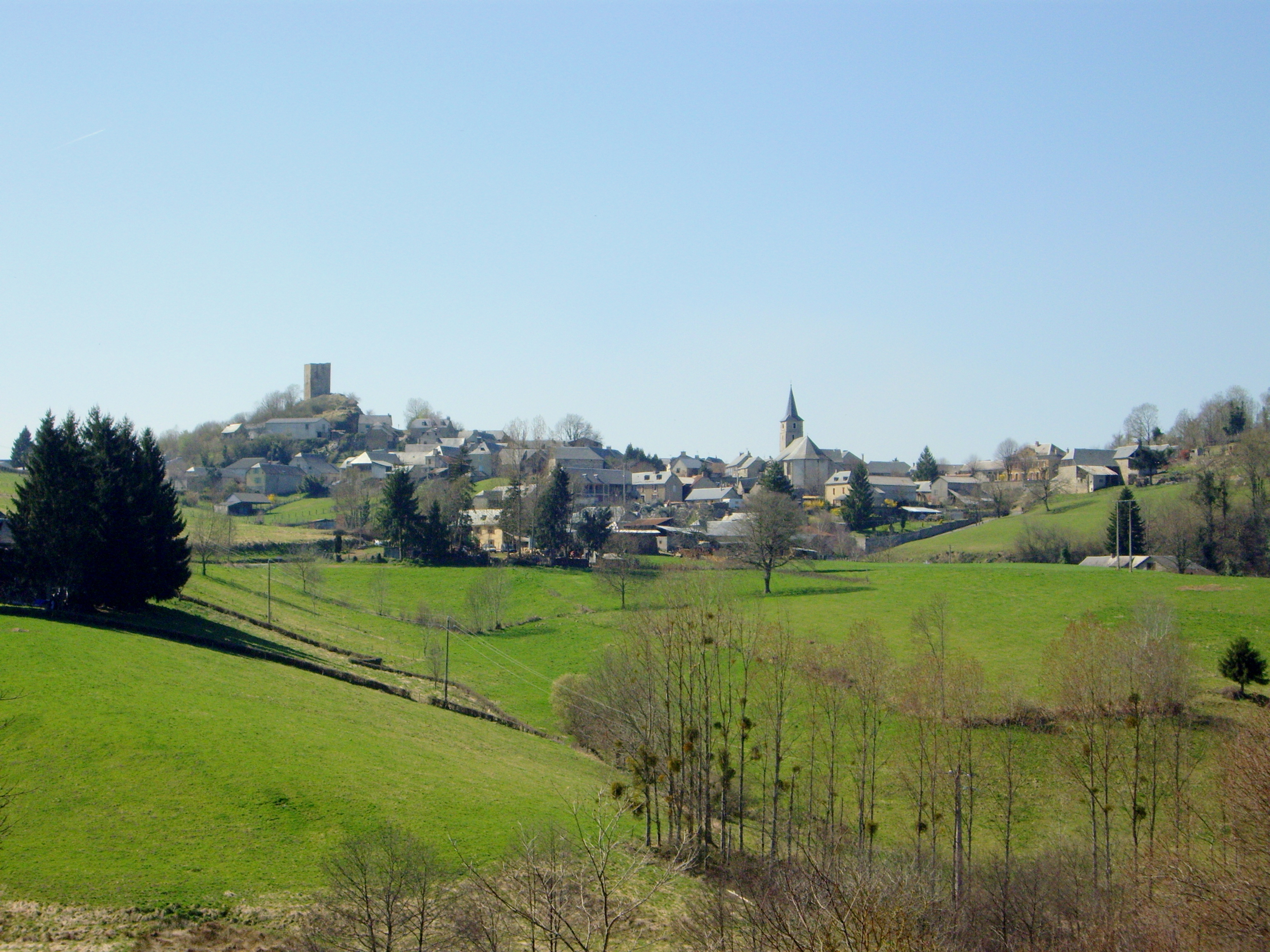
- A general view of Avezac

- Coat of arms
- Location of Avezac-Prat-Lahitte
- Location within France Location within Occitanie
- Coordinates: 43°04′00″N 0°20′17″E
- Country: France
- Region: Occitania
- Department: Hautes-Pyrénées
- Arrondissement: Bagnères-de-Bigorre
- Canton: Neste, Aure et Louron
- Intercommunality: CC Plateau de Lannemezan

Government
  - Mayor (2020–2026): Albert Bégué
- Area^{1}: 17.81 km^{2} (6.88 sq mi)
- Elevation: 650 m (2,130 ft)
- Highest elevation: 733 m (2,405 ft)
- Lowest elevation: 380 m (1,250 ft)
- Population (2023): 581
  - Density: 32.6/km^{2} (84.5/sq mi)
- Time zone: UTC+01:00 (CET)
  - Summer (DST): UTC+02:00 (CEST)
- INSEE/Postal code: 65054 /65130
- ^{1} French Land Register data, which excludes lakes, ponds, glaciers > 1 km^{2} (0.386 sq mi or 247 acres) and river estuaries.

Avezac-Prat-Lahitte (French pronunciation: [avzak pʁat la.it]; Occitan: Avesac, Prat e era Hita) is a commune in the Hautes-Pyrénées department in southwestern France. It was created in 1973 by the merger of two former communes: Lahitte and Avezac-Prat.

== Population ==
Historical population
Year	Pop.	±% p.a.
1968	544	—
1975	622	+1.93%
1982	600	−0.51%
1990	596	−0.08%
1999	514	−1.63%
2007	563	+1.14%
2012	564	+0.04%
2017	602	+1.31%
2023	581	−0.59%
Source: INSEE

== See also ==
- Communes of the Hautes-Pyrénées department
