= Vignec =

- Commune
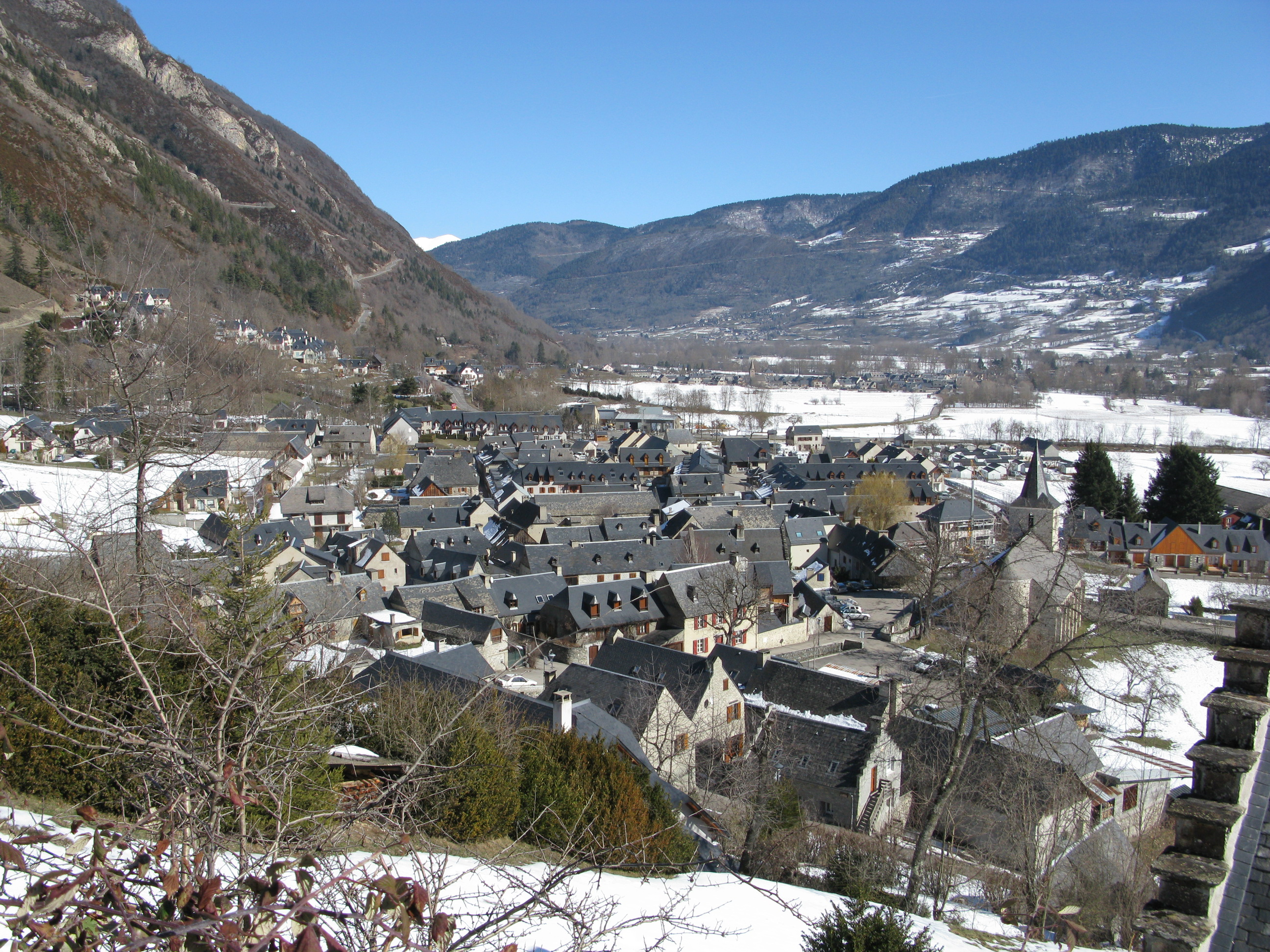
- An overview of the commune

- Coat of arms
- Location of Vignec
- Location within France Location within Occitanie
- Coordinates: 42°49′33″N 0°19′02″E
- Country: France
- Region: Occitania
- Department: Hautes-Pyrénées
- Arrondissement: Bagnères-de-Bigorre
- Canton: Neste, Aure et Louron
- Intercommunality: Aure Louron

Government
  - Mayor (2020–2026): Jean-Michel Isoart
- Area^{1}: 6.42 km^{2} (2.48 sq mi)
- Elevation: 800 m (2,600 ft)
- Highest elevation: 2,530 m (8,300 ft)
- Lowest elevation: 797 m (2,615 ft)
- Population (2023): 191
  - Density: 29.8/km^{2} (77.1/sq mi)
- Time zone: UTC+01:00 (CET)
  - Summer (DST): UTC+02:00 (CEST)
- INSEE/Postal code: 65471 /65170
- ^{1} French Land Register data, which excludes lakes, ponds, glaciers > 1 km^{2} (0.386 sq mi or 247 acres) and river estuaries.

Vignec (French pronunciation: [viɲɛk]; Occitan: Biec) is a commune in the Hautes-Pyrénées department in south-western France.

== See also ==
- Communes of the Hautes-Pyrénées department
