= Estensan =

- Commune
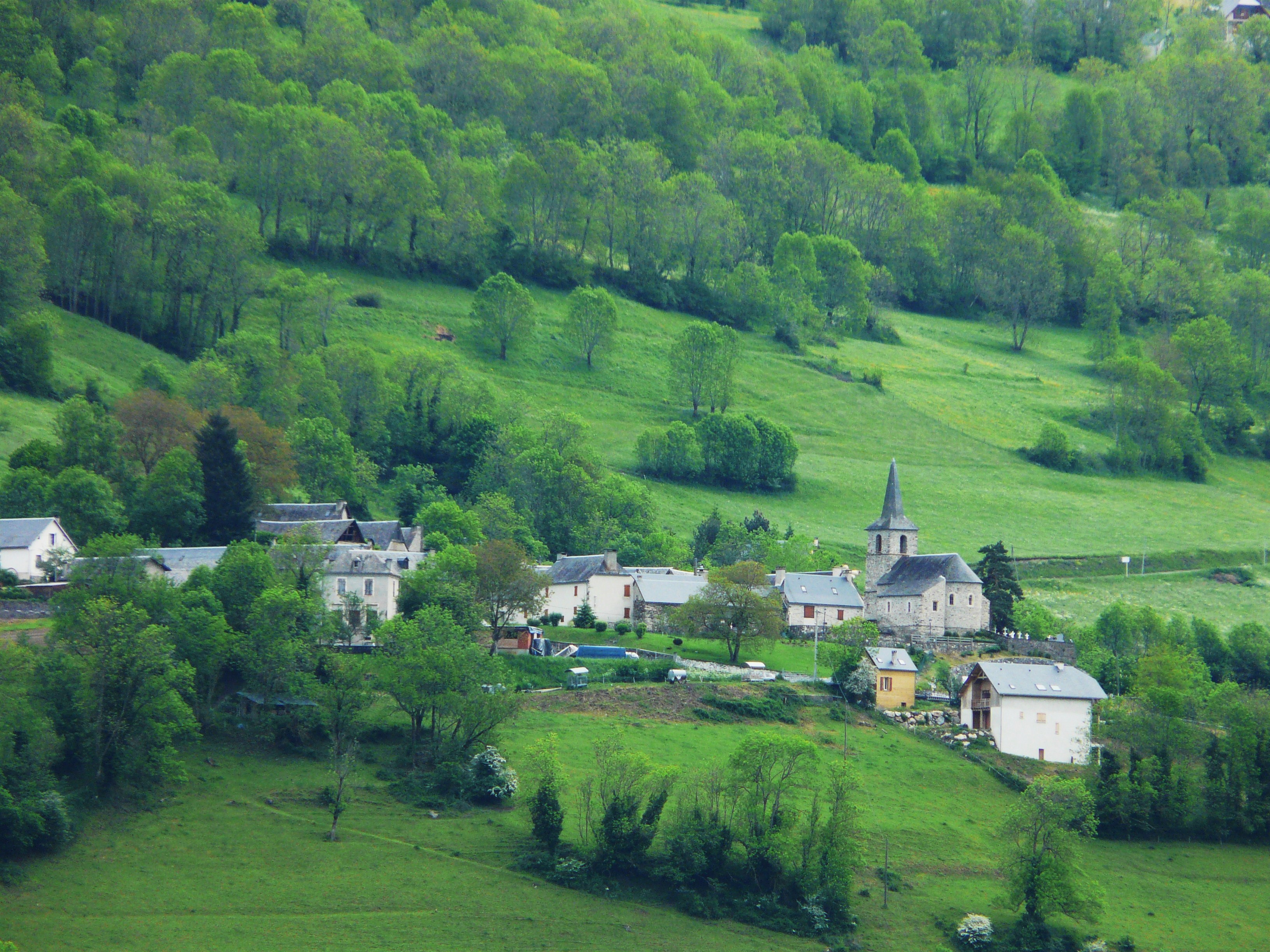
- The village of Estensan

- Coat of arms
- Location of Estensan
- Location within France Location within Occitanie
- Coordinates: 42°49′10″N 0°20′44″E
- Country: France
- Region: Occitania
- Department: Hautes-Pyrénées
- Arrondissement: Bagnères-de-Bigorre
- Canton: Neste, Aure et Louron
- Intercommunality: Aure-Louron

Government
  - Mayor (2020–2026): Louis Ricard
- Area^{1}: 1.54 km^{2} (0.59 sq mi)
- Elevation: 974 m (3,196 ft)
- Highest elevation: 1,255 m (4,117 ft)
- Lowest elevation: 880 m (2,890 ft)
- Population (2023): 48
  - Density: 31/km^{2} (81/sq mi)
- Time zone: UTC+01:00 (CET)
  - Summer (DST): UTC+02:00 (CEST)
- INSEE/Postal code: 65172 /65170
- ^{1} French Land Register data, which excludes lakes, ponds, glaciers > 1 km^{2} (0.386 sq mi or 247 acres) and river estuaries.

Estensan is a commune in the Hautes-Pyrénées department in south-western France.

== See also ==
- Communes of the Hautes-Pyrénées department
