= Gouaux =

- Commune
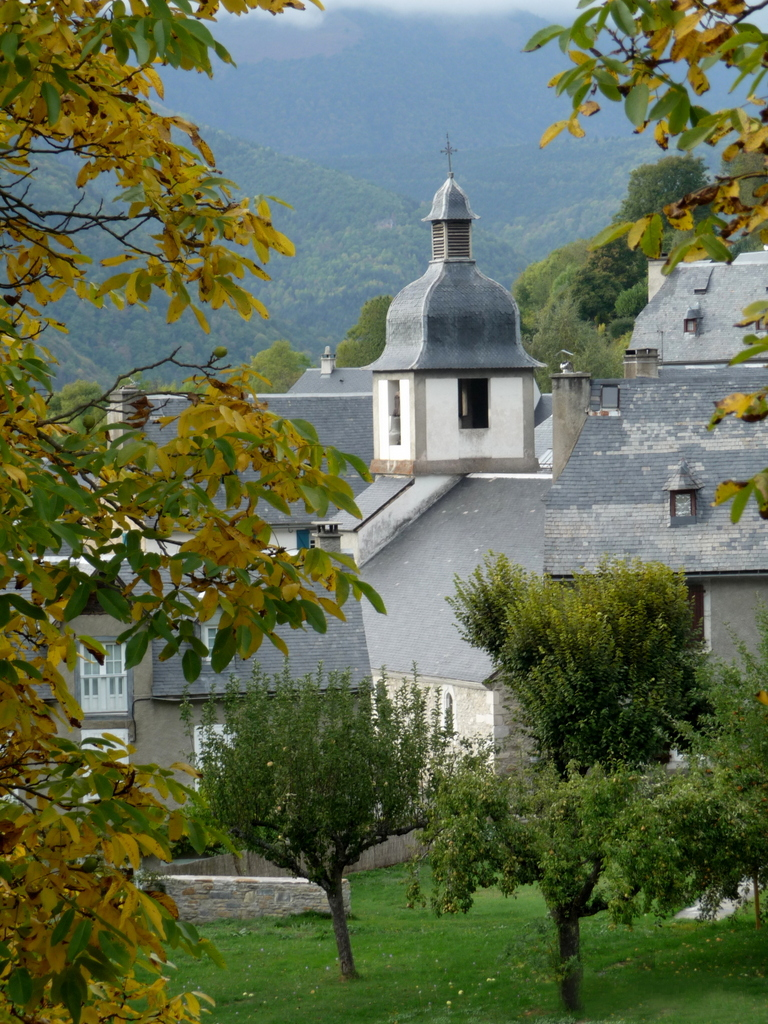
- The church of Notre-Dame

- Coat of arms
- Location of Gouaux
- Location within France Location within Occitanie
- Coordinates: 42°51′58″N 0°21′45″E
- Country: France
- Region: Occitania
- Department: Hautes-Pyrénées
- Arrondissement: Bagnères-de-Bigorre
- Canton: Neste, Aure et Louron
- Intercommunality: Aure-Louron

Government
  - Mayor (2020–2026): Michel Chazottes
- Area^{1}: 6.02 km^{2} (2.32 sq mi)
- Elevation: 945 m (3,100 ft)
- Highest elevation: 1,687 m (5,535 ft)
- Lowest elevation: 852 m (2,795 ft)
- Population (2023): 54
  - Density: 9.0/km^{2} (23/sq mi)
- Time zone: UTC+01:00 (CET)
  - Summer (DST): UTC+02:00 (CEST)
- INSEE/Postal code: 65205 /65440
- ^{1} French Land Register data, which excludes lakes, ponds, glaciers > 1 km^{2} (0.386 sq mi or 247 acres) and river estuaries.

Gouaux is a commune in the Hautes-Pyrénées department in south-western France.

== See also ==
- Communes of the Hautes-Pyrénées department
