= Avajan =

- Commune
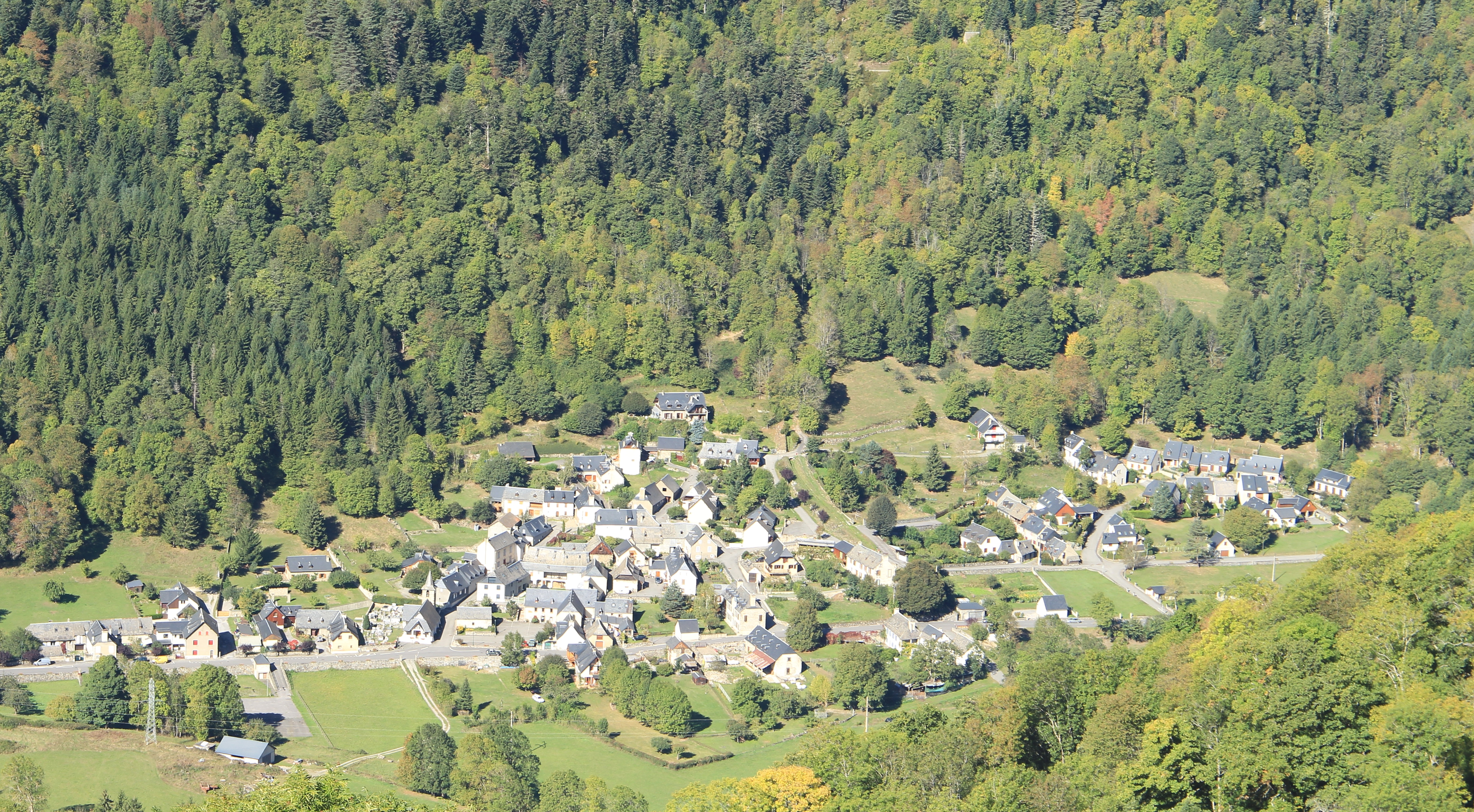

- Coat of arms
- Location of Avajan
- Location within France Location within Occitanie
- Coordinates: 42°50′36″N 0°24′29″E
- Country: France
- Region: Occitania
- Department: Hautes-Pyrénées
- Arrondissement: Bagnères-de-Bigorre
- Canton: Neste, Aure et Louron
- Intercommunality: CC Aure Louron

Government
  - Mayor (2020–2026): Patrick Gistau
- Area^{1}: 3.29 km^{2} (1.27 sq mi)
- Elevation: 913 m (2,995 ft)
- Highest elevation: 1,687 m (5,535 ft)
- Lowest elevation: 880 m (2,890 ft)
- Population (2023): 82
  - Density: 25/km^{2} (65/sq mi)
- Time zone: UTC+01:00 (CET)
  - Summer (DST): UTC+02:00 (CEST)
- INSEE/Postal code: 65050 /65240
- ^{1} French Land Register data, which excludes lakes, ponds, glaciers > 1 km^{2} (0.386 sq mi or 247 acres) and river estuaries.

Avajan (French pronunciation: [avaʒɑ̃]; Occitan: Avanha) is a commune in the Louron Valley in the Hautes-Pyrénées department in southwestern France.

The center of the commune is the old village, centered on the church and town hall. Many developments have grown up on the outskirts of the old village since the 1970s, including a man-made lake and camping area.

== Population ==
Historical population
Year	Pop.	±% p.a.
1968	45	—
1975	30	−5.63%
1982	52	+8.17%
1990	58	+1.37%
1999	68	+1.78%
2007	76	+1.40%
2012	67	−2.49%
2017	78	+3.09%
2023	82	+0.84%
Source: INSEE

== See also ==
- Communes of the Hautes-Pyrénées department
