= Cadeilhan-Trachère =

- Commune
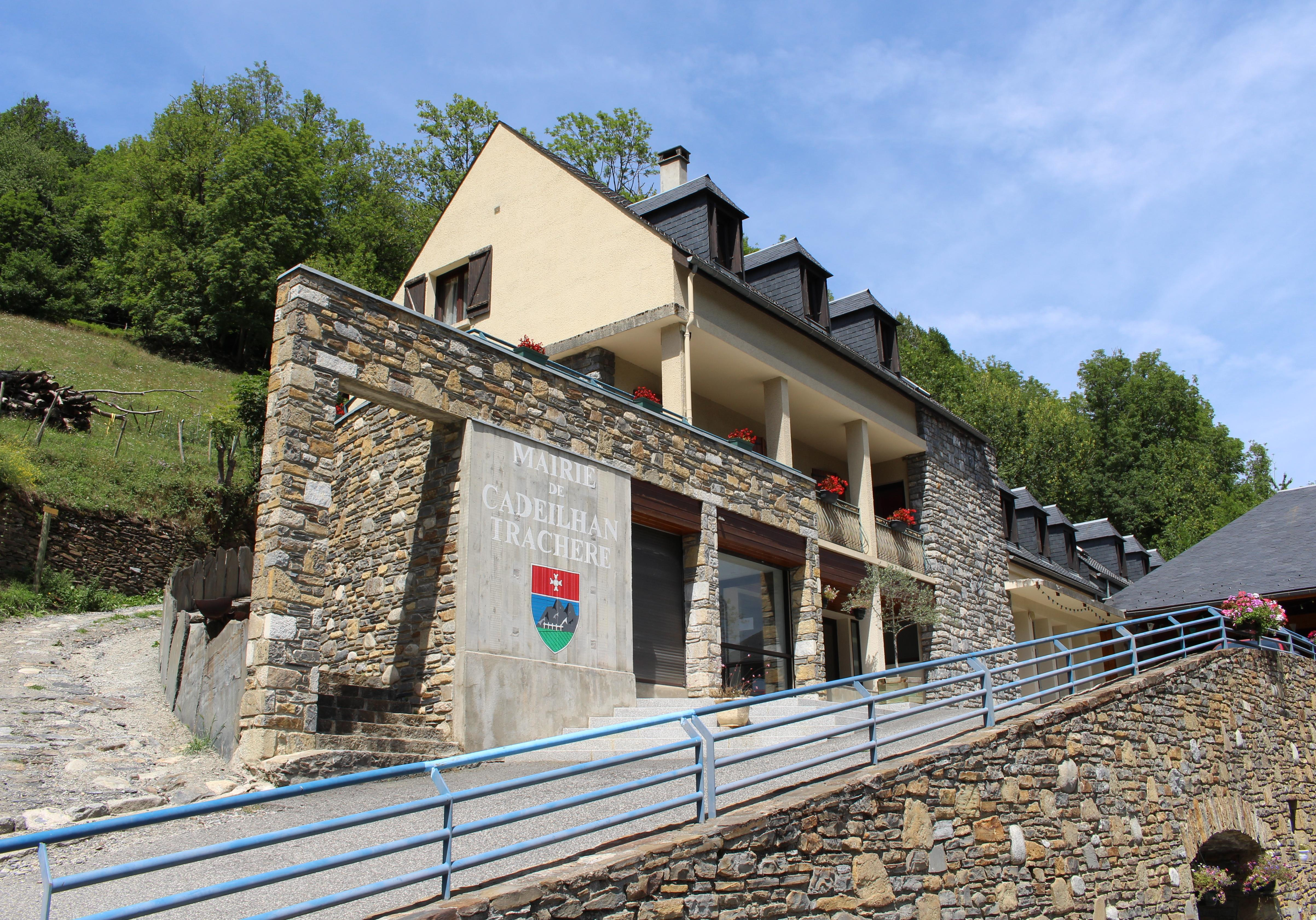
- Town hall of Cadeilhan-Trachère

- Coat of arms
- Location of Cadeilhan-Trachère
- Location within France Location within Occitanie
- Coordinates: 42°49′02″N 0°18′55″E
- Country: France
- Region: Occitania
- Department: Hautes-Pyrénées
- Arrondissement: Bagnères-de-Bigorre
- Canton: Neste, Aure et Louron

Government
  - Mayor (2020–2026): Michel Bessone
- Area^{1}: 4.86 km^{2} (1.88 sq mi)
- Elevation: 840 m (2,760 ft)
- Highest elevation: 1,924 m (6,312 ft)
- Lowest elevation: 834 m (2,736 ft)
- Population (2023): 43
  - Density: 8.8/km^{2} (23/sq mi)
- Time zone: UTC+01:00 (CET)
  - Summer (DST): UTC+02:00 (CEST)
- INSEE/Postal code: 65117 /65170
- ^{1} French Land Register data, which excludes lakes, ponds, glaciers > 1 km^{2} (0.386 sq mi or 247 acres) and river estuaries.

Cadeilhan-Trachère (French pronunciation: [kadɛjɑ̃ tʁaʃɛʁ]; Occitan: Cadelha e Trashèrra) is a commune in the Hautes-Pyrénées department in south-western France.

== See also ==
- Communes of the Hautes-Pyrénées department
