= Pailhac =

- Commune
- Coat of arms
- Location of Pailhac
- Location within France Location within Occitanie
- Coordinates: 42°54′32″N 0°22′08″E
- Country: France
- Region: Occitania
- Department: Hautes-Pyrénées
- Arrondissement: Bagnères-de-Bigorre
- Canton: Neste, Aure et Louron
- Intercommunality: Aure-Louron

Government
  - Mayor (2020–2026): Isabelle Robin
- Area^{1}: 0.9 km^{2} (0.35 sq mi)
- Elevation: 745 m (2,444 ft)
- Highest elevation: 977 m (3,205 ft)
- Lowest elevation: 720 m (2,360 ft)
- Population (2023): 85
  - Density: 94/km^{2} (240/sq mi)
- Time zone: UTC+01:00 (CET)
  - Summer (DST): UTC+02:00 (CEST)
- INSEE/Postal code: 65354 /65240
- ^{1} French Land Register data, which excludes lakes, ponds, glaciers > 1 km^{2} (0.386 sq mi or 247 acres) and river estuaries.

Pailhac (French pronunciation: [pajak]; Occitan: Palhac) is a commune in the Hautes-Pyrénées department in south-western France.

== History ==
On June 25, 1687, a fire destroyed almost the entire village. Only the church and one house were spared.

== Toponymy ==
The Occitan name of the municipality is Palhac.

Its origin lies in an ancient estate. It derives from the Latin personal name Palius with the suffix -acum ("Palius's estate").

Toponyms and mentions of Pailhac include:

- De Palhaco (1387, Church Register of the Comminges),
- Pailhac (1750 and 1793, Map of Cassini and Notice Communale, respectively),
- Paillac (1801, Bulletin des lois).

== See also ==
- Communes of the Hautes-Pyrénées department
