= Bazus-Aure =

- Commune
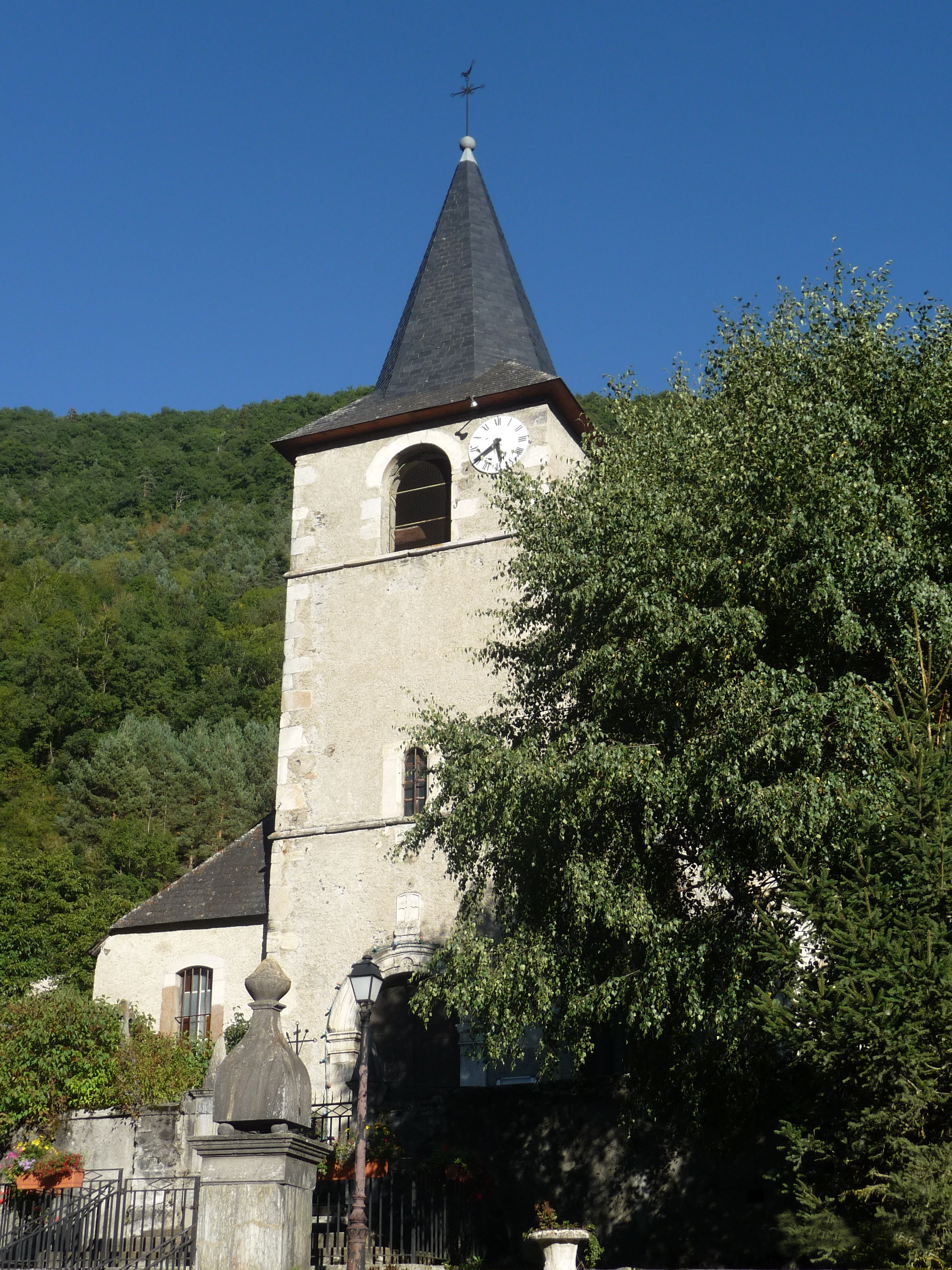

- Coat of arms
- Location of Bazus-Aure
- Location within France Location within Occitanie
- Coordinates: 42°51′24″N 0°21′00″E
- Country: France
- Region: Occitania
- Department: Hautes-Pyrénées
- Arrondissement: Bagnères-de-Bigorre
- Canton: Neste, Aure et Louron

Government
  - Mayor (2020–2026): Hélène Malère
- Area^{1}: 1.95 km^{2} (0.75 sq mi)
- Elevation: 777 m (2,549 ft)
- Highest elevation: 1,504 m (4,934 ft)
- Lowest elevation: 755 m (2,477 ft)
- Population (2023): 147
  - Density: 75.4/km^{2} (195/sq mi)
- Time zone: UTC+01:00 (CET)
  - Summer (DST): UTC+02:00 (CEST)
- INSEE/Postal code: 65075 /65170
- ^{1} French Land Register data, which excludes lakes, ponds, glaciers > 1 km^{2} (0.386 sq mi or 247 acres) and river estuaries.

Bazus-Aure is a commune in the Hautes-Pyrénées department in southwestern France.

== Geography ==
=== Climate ===
Bazus-Aure has an oceanic climate (Köppen climate classification Cfb). The average annual temperature in Bazus-Aure is 10.7 °C (51.3 °F). The average annual rainfall is 843.5 mm (33.21 in) with November as the wettest month. The temperatures are highest on average in July, at around 18.5 °C (65.3 °F), and lowest in January, at around 3.5 °C (38.3 °F). The highest temperature ever recorded in Bazus-Aure was 38.6 °C (101.5 °F) on 27 June 2019; the coldest temperature ever recorded was −20.1 °C (−4.2 °F) on 8 February 2012.

Climate data for Bazus-Aure (1991−2020 normals, extremes 2003−present)
Month	Jan	Feb	Mar	Apr	May	Jun	Jul	Aug	Sep	Oct	Nov	Dec	Year
Record high °C (°F)	21.3 (70.3)	24.3 (75.7)	24.6 (76.3)	28.3 (82.9)	34.5 (94.1)	38.6 (101.5)	37.5 (99.5)	37.5 (99.5)	34.7 (94.5)	30.9 (87.6)	25.7 (78.3)	24.9 (76.8)	38.6 (101.5)
Mean daily maximum °C (°F)	9.3 (48.7)	10.3 (50.5)	13.1 (55.6)	15.7 (60.3)	18.8 (65.8)	22.6 (72.7)	24.8 (76.6)	24.7 (76.5)	22.1 (71.8)	19.3 (66.7)	13.3 (55.9)	10.2 (50.4)	17.0 (62.6)
Daily mean °C (°F)	3.5 (38.3)	3.9 (39.0)	6.6 (43.9)	9.6 (49.3)	12.7 (54.9)	16.3 (61.3)	18.5 (65.3)	18.2 (64.8)	15.3 (59.5)	12.4 (54.3)	7.1 (44.8)	4.1 (39.4)	10.7 (51.3)
Mean daily minimum °C (°F)	−2.4 (27.7)	−2.5 (27.5)	0.2 (32.4)	3.4 (38.1)	6.6 (43.9)	10.0 (50.0)	12.2 (54.0)	11.7 (53.1)	8.4 (47.1)	5.6 (42.1)	1.0 (33.8)	−2.0 (28.4)	4.3 (39.7)
Record low °C (°F)	−17.8 (0.0)	−20.1 (−4.2)	−19.2 (−2.6)	−5.5 (22.1)	−3.1 (26.4)	−1.2 (29.8)	2.5 (36.5)	4.2 (39.6)	−2.5 (27.5)	−6.4 (20.5)	−11.7 (10.9)	−14.8 (5.4)	−20.1 (−4.2)
Average precipitation mm (inches)	89.8 (3.54)	67.8 (2.67)	70.8 (2.79)	83.5 (3.29)	87.7 (3.45)	70.4 (2.77)	51.9 (2.04)	49.8 (1.96)	49.7 (1.96)	59.1 (2.33)	97.6 (3.84)	65.4 (2.57)	843.5 (33.21)
Average precipitation days (≥ 1.0 mm)	9.2	8.4	9.7	12.4	11.4	10.1	7.5	6.9	7.3	8.4	9.8	8.7	109.7
Source: Météo-France

== Population ==
Historical population
Year	Pop.	±% p.a.
1968	122	—
1975	101	−2.66%
1982	112	+1.49%
1990	112	+0.00%
1999	118	+0.58%
2007	132	+1.41%
2012	134	+0.30%
2017	131	−0.45%
2023	147	+1.94%
Source: INSEE

== See also ==
- Communes of the Hautes-Pyrénées department
