= Ris, Hautes-Pyrénées =

Ris
- Commune
- Coat of arms
- Location of Ris
- Location within France Location within Occitanie
- Coordinates: 42°53′17″N 0°23′55″E
- Country: France
- Region: Occitania
- Department: Hautes-Pyrénées
- Arrondissement: Bagnères-de-Bigorre
- Canton: Neste, Aure et Louron
- Area^{1}: 1.89 km^{2} (0.73 sq mi)
- Elevation: 1,000 m (3,300 ft)
- Highest elevation: 1,604 m (5,262 ft)
- Lowest elevation: 920 m (3,020 ft)
- Population (2023): 13
  - Density: 6.9/km^{2} (18/sq mi)
- Time zone: UTC+01:00 (CET)
  - Summer (DST): UTC+02:00 (CEST)
- INSEE/Postal code: 65379 /65590
- ^{1} French Land Register data, which excludes lakes, ponds, glaciers > 1 km^{2} (0.386 sq mi or 247 acres) and river estuaries.

Ris is a commune in the Hautes-Pyrénées department in south-western France.

== See also ==
- Communes of the Hautes-Pyrénées department
