= Aspin-Aure =

- Commune
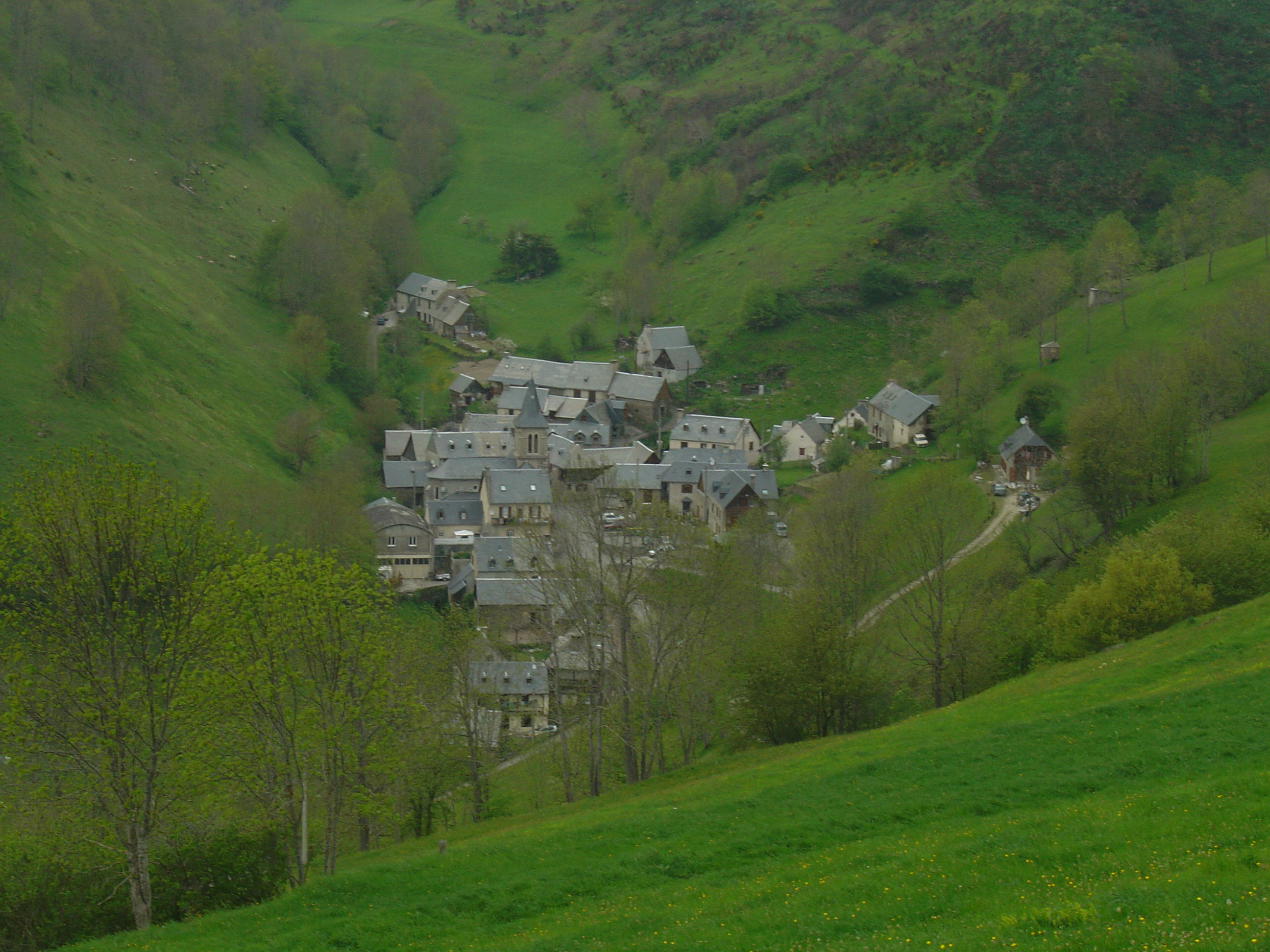
- The village seen from the road to the Col d'Aspin

- Coat of arms
- Location of Aspin-Aure
- Location within France Location within Occitanie
- Coordinates: 42°55′59″N 0°20′28″E
- Country: France
- Region: Occitania
- Department: Hautes-Pyrénées
- Arrondissement: Bagnères-de-Bigorre
- Canton: Neste, Aure et Louron
- Intercommunality: CC Aure Louron

Government
  - Mayor (2020–2026): Pierre Estrade
- Area^{1}: 12.27 km^{2} (4.74 sq mi)
- Elevation: 900 m (3,000 ft)
- Highest elevation: 1,759 m (5,771 ft)
- Lowest elevation: 739 m (2,425 ft)
- Population (2023): 43
  - Density: 3.5/km^{2} (9.1/sq mi)
- Time zone: UTC+01:00 (CET)
  - Summer (DST): UTC+02:00 (CEST)
- INSEE/Postal code: 65039 /65240
- ^{1} French Land Register data, which excludes lakes, ponds, glaciers > 1 km^{2} (0.386 sq mi or 247 acres) and river estuaries.

Aspin-Aure (French pronunciation: [aspɛ̃ ɔʁ]; Occitan: Aspin) is a commune in the Hautes-Pyrénées department in southwestern France.

== Population ==
Historical population
Year	Pop.	±% p.a.
1968	82	—
1975	64	−3.48%
1982	69	+1.08%
1990	51	−3.71%
1999	42	−2.13%
2007	51	+2.46%
2012	54	+1.15%
2017	45	−3.58%
2023	43	−0.75%
Source: INSEE

== See also ==
- Communes of the Hautes-Pyrénées department
