= Lançon, Hautes-Pyrénées =

Lançon
- Commune
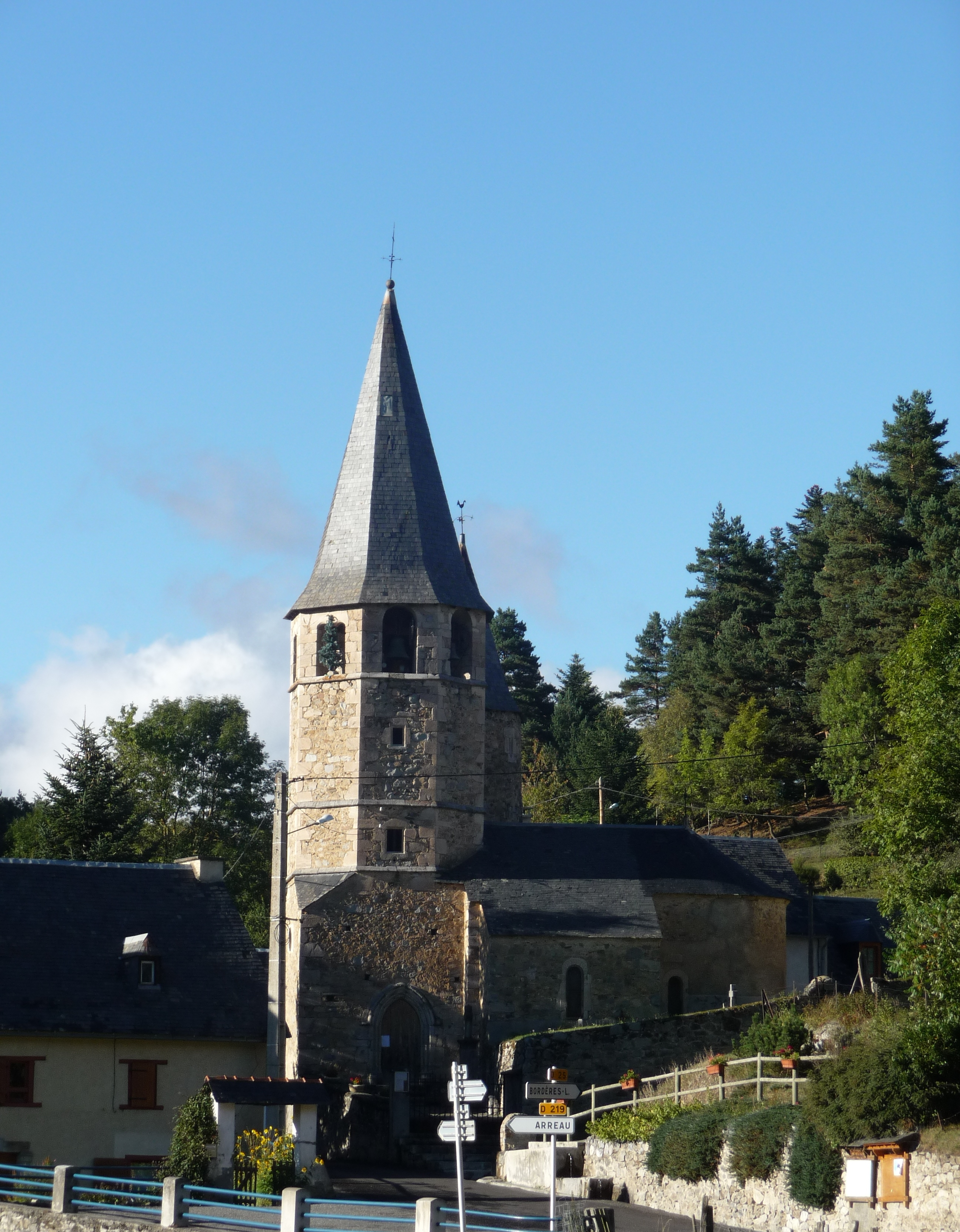
- The church of Sainte-Eulalie

- Coat of arms
- Location of Lançon
- Location within France Location within Occitanie
- Coordinates: 42°53′11″N 0°22′02″E
- Country: France
- Region: Occitania
- Department: Hautes-Pyrénées
- Arrondissement: Bagnères-de-Bigorre
- Canton: Neste, Aure et Louron
- Intercommunality: Aure-Louron

Government
  - Mayor (2020–2026): Éric Gay
- Area^{1}: 2.8 km^{2} (1.1 sq mi)
- Elevation: 1,089 m (3,573 ft)
- Highest elevation: 1,365 m (4,478 ft)
- Lowest elevation: 918 m (3,012 ft)
- Population (2023): 34
  - Density: 12/km^{2} (31/sq mi)
- Time zone: UTC+01:00 (CET)
  - Summer (DST): UTC+02:00 (CEST)
- INSEE/Postal code: 65255 /65240
- ^{1} French Land Register data, which excludes lakes, ponds, glaciers > 1 km^{2} (0.386 sq mi or 247 acres) and river estuaries.

Lançon (French pronunciation: [lɑ̃sɔ̃]; Occitan: Lançon) is a commune in the Hautes-Pyrénées department in south-western France.

== See also ==
- Communes of the Hautes-Pyrénées department
