= Cazaux-Debat =

- Commune
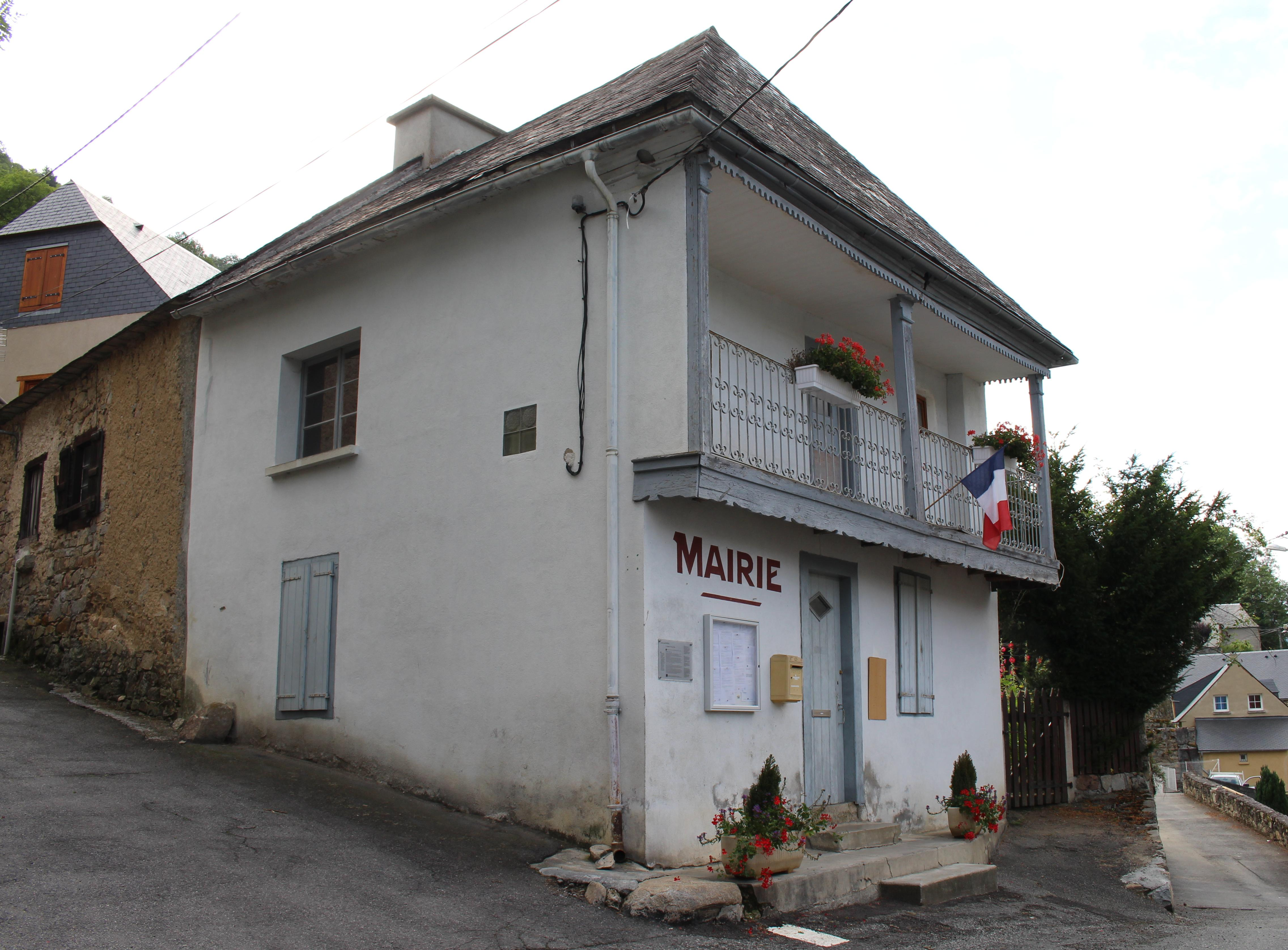
- View of Cazaux-Debat town hall

- Coat of arms
- Location of Cazaux-Debat
- Location within France Location within Occitanie
- Coordinates: 42°53′21″N 0°23′07″E
- Country: France
- Region: Occitania
- Department: Hautes-Pyrénées
- Arrondissement: Bagnères-de-Bigorre
- Canton: Neste, Aure et Louron

Government
  - Mayor (2020–2026): Bernard Escoula
- Area^{1}: 1.48 km^{2} (0.57 sq mi)
- Elevation: 800 m (2,600 ft)
- Highest elevation: 1,106 m (3,629 ft)
- Lowest elevation: 753 m (2,470 ft)
- Population (2023): 34
  - Density: 23/km^{2} (59/sq mi)
- Time zone: UTC+01:00 (CET)
  - Summer (DST): UTC+02:00 (CEST)
- INSEE/Postal code: 65140 /65590
- ^{1} French Land Register data, which excludes lakes, ponds, glaciers > 1 km^{2} (0.386 sq mi or 247 acres) and river estuaries.

Cazaux-Debat is a commune in the Hautes-Pyrénées department in south-western France.

== See also ==
- Communes of the Hautes-Pyrénées department
