= Cazaux-Fréchet-Anéran-Camors =

- Commune
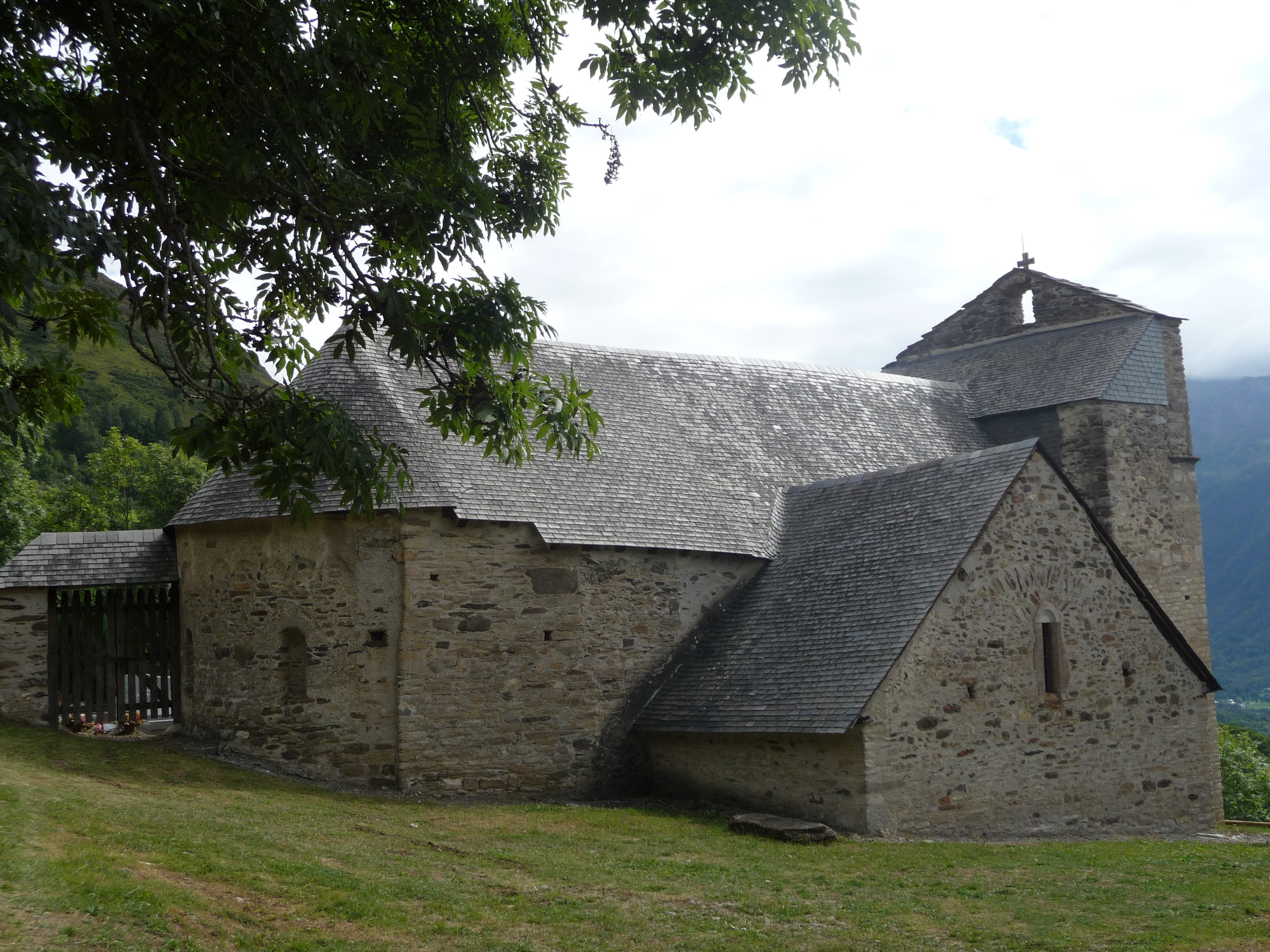
- Cazaux-Fréchet-Anéran-Camors (church)

- Coat of arms
- Location of Cazaux-Fréchet-Anéran-Camors
- Location within France Location within Occitanie
- Coordinates: 42°49′51″N 0°25′15″E
- Country: France
- Region: Occitania
- Department: Hautes-Pyrénées
- Arrondissement: Bagnères-de-Bigorre
- Canton: Neste, Aure et Louron

Government
  - Mayor (2020–2026): Dominique Galaup
- Area^{1}: 12.35 km^{2} (4.77 sq mi)
- Elevation: 1,150 m (3,770 ft)
- Highest elevation: 2,173 m (7,129 ft)
- Lowest elevation: 908 m (2,979 ft)
- Population (2023): 68
  - Density: 5.5/km^{2} (14/sq mi)
- Time zone: UTC+01:00 (CET)
  - Summer (DST): UTC+02:00 (CEST)
- INSEE/Postal code: 65141 /65510
- ^{1} French Land Register data, which excludes lakes, ponds, glaciers > 1 km^{2} (0.386 sq mi or 247 acres) and river estuaries.

Cazaux-Fréchet-Anéran-Camors is a commune in the Hautes-Pyrénées department in south-western France.

== See also ==
- Communes of the Hautes-Pyrénées department
