= Lézignan =

Lézignan may refer to:

In geography:

- Lézignan, Hautes-Pyrénées, a commune in the Hautes-Pyrénées department, France
- Lézignan-Corbières, a commune in the Aude department, France
- Lézignan-la-Cèbe, a commune in the Hérault department, France

In other uses:

- Lézignan Sangliers, a rugby league football club based in Lézignan-Corbières
