= Cheust =

- Commune
- Coat of arms
- Location of Cheust
- Location within France Location within Occitanie
- Coordinates: 43°03′06″N 0°00′59″E
- Country: France
- Region: Occitania
- Department: Hautes-Pyrénées
- Arrondissement: Argelès-Gazost
- Canton: Lourdes-2
- Intercommunality: CA Tarbes-Lourdes-Pyrénées

Government
  - Mayor (2020–2026): Paul Laffaille
- Area^{1}: 3.06 km^{2} (1.18 sq mi)
- Elevation: 458 m (1,503 ft)
- Highest elevation: 862 m (2,828 ft)
- Lowest elevation: 532 m (1,745 ft)
- Population (2023): 85
  - Density: 28/km^{2} (72/sq mi)
- Time zone: UTC+01:00 (CET)
  - Summer (DST): UTC+02:00 (CEST)
- INSEE/Postal code: 65144 /65100
- ^{1} French Land Register data, which excludes lakes, ponds, glaciers > 1 km^{2} (0.386 sq mi or 247 acres) and river estuaries.

Cheust is a commune in the Hautes-Pyrénées department in south-western France.

== See also ==
- Communes of the Hautes-Pyrénées department
