= Peyrouse =

- Commune
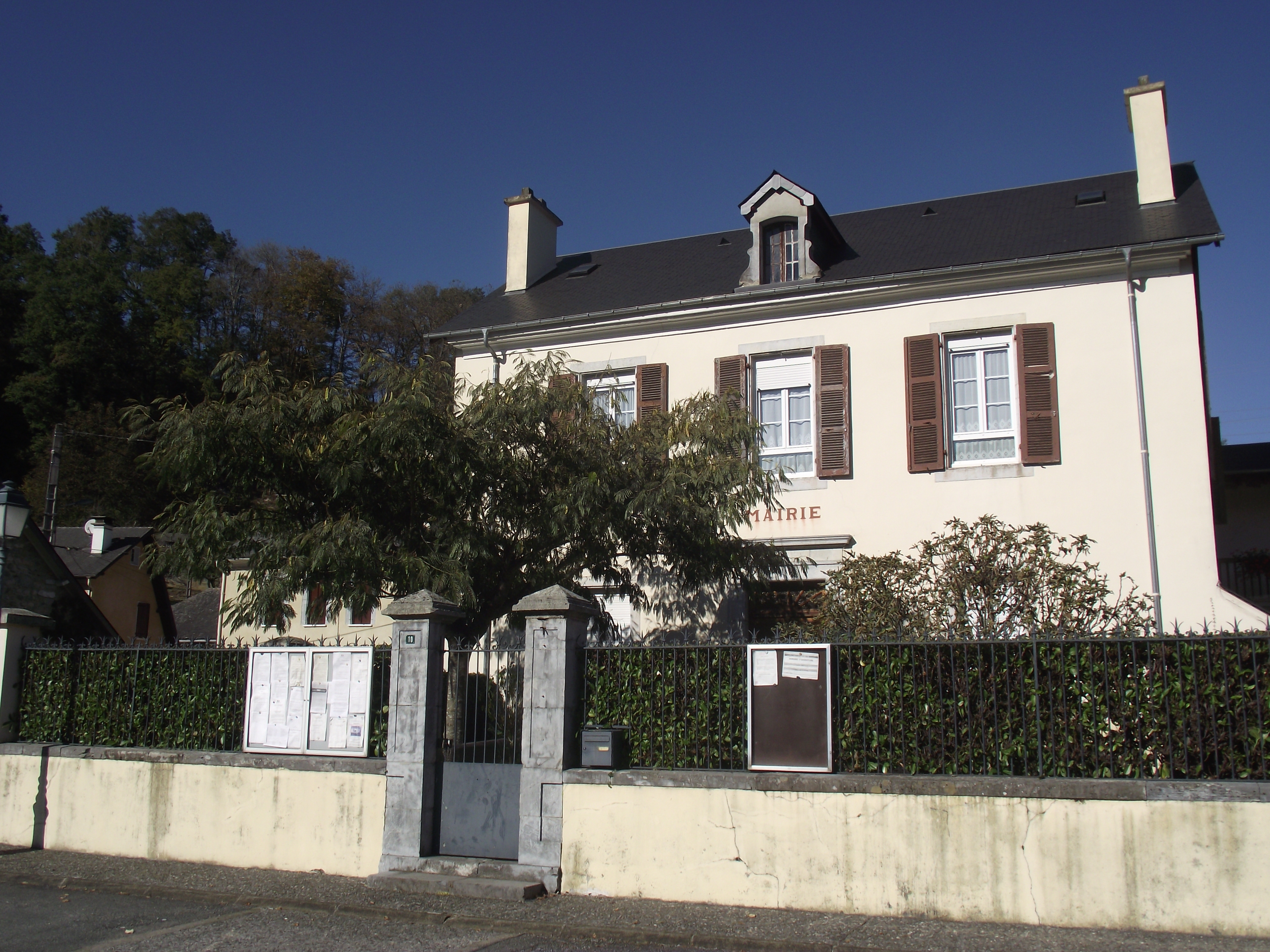
- The town hall

- Coat of arms
- Location of Peyrouse
- Location within France Location within Occitanie
- Coordinates: 43°06′19″N 0°06′57″W
- Country: France
- Region: Occitania
- Department: Hautes-Pyrénées
- Arrondissement: Argelès-Gazost
- Canton: Lourdes-1
- Intercommunality: CA Tarbes-Lourdes-Pyrénées

Government
  - Mayor (2020–2026): Claude Caussade
- Area^{1}: 4.8 km^{2} (1.9 sq mi)
- Elevation: 56 m (184 ft)
- Highest elevation: 784 m (2,572 ft)
- Lowest elevation: 350 m (1,150 ft)
- Population (2023): 275
  - Density: 57/km^{2} (150/sq mi)
- Time zone: UTC+01:00 (CET)
  - Summer (DST): UTC+02:00 (CEST)
- INSEE/Postal code: 65360 /65270
- ^{1} French Land Register data, which excludes lakes, ponds, glaciers > 1 km^{2} (0.386 sq mi or 247 acres) and river estuaries.

Peyrouse (French pronunciation: [pejʁuz]; Occitan: Peirosa) is a commune in the Hautes-Pyrénées department in south-western France.

== See also ==
- Communes of the Hautes-Pyrénées department
