= Adé, Hautes-Pyrénées =

Adé
- Commune
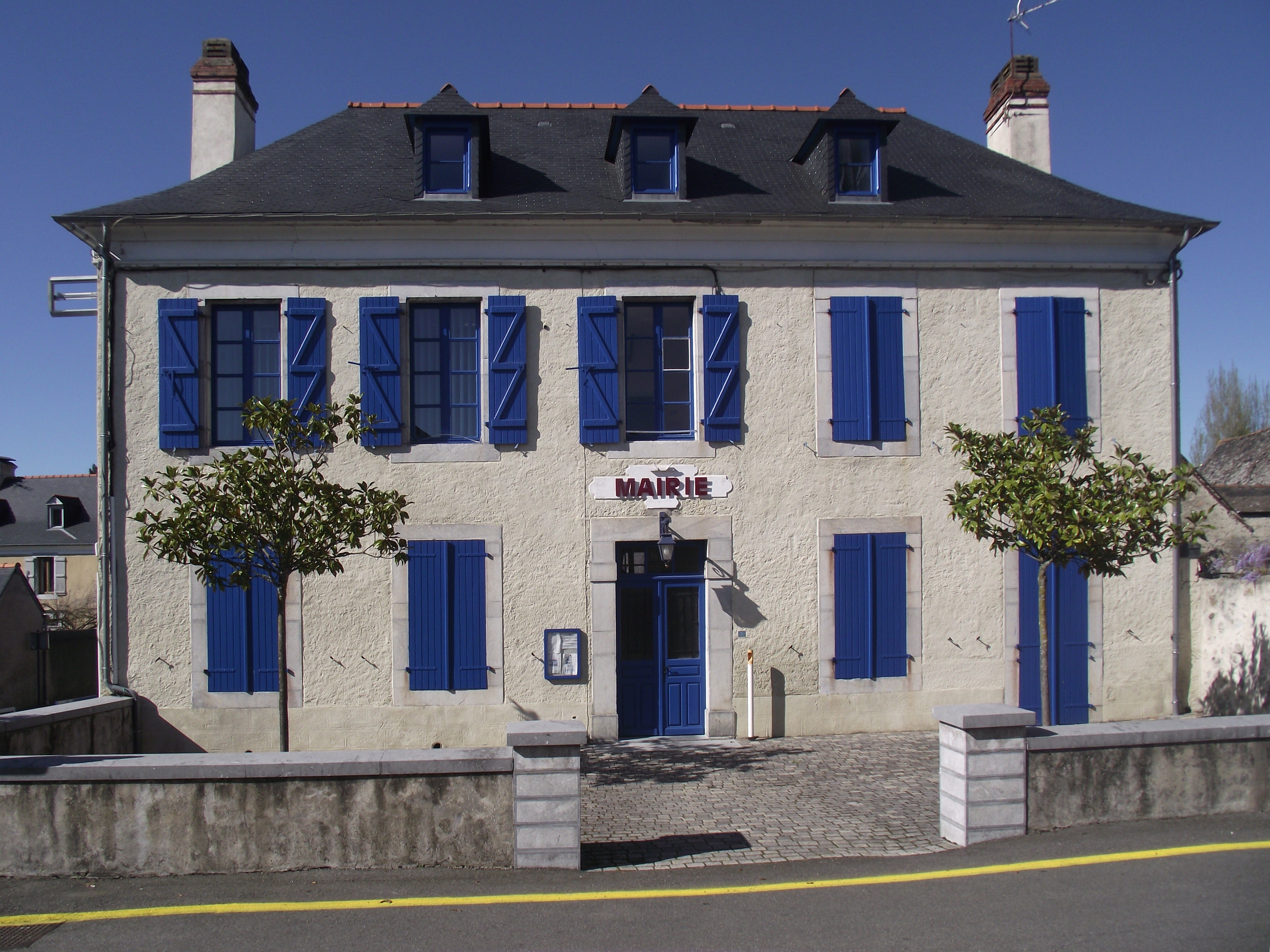
- The town hall of Adé.

- Coat of arms
- Location of Adé
- Location within France Location within Occitanie
- Coordinates: 43°08′05″N 0°01′34″W
- Country: France
- Region: Occitania
- Department: Hautes-Pyrénées
- Arrondissement: Argelès-Gazost
- Canton: Lourdes-2
- Intercommunality: Tarbes-Lourdes-Pyrénées

Government
  - Mayor (2020–2026): Jean-Marc Boya
- Area^{1}: 7.24 km^{2} (2.80 sq mi)
- Elevation: 428 m (1,404 ft)
- Highest elevation: 583 m (1,913 ft)
- Lowest elevation: 382 m (1,253 ft)
- Population (2023): 856
  - Density: 118/km^{2} (306/sq mi)
- Time zone: UTC+01:00 (CET)
  - Summer (DST): UTC+02:00 (CEST)
- INSEE/Postal code: 65002 /65100
- ^{1} French Land Register data, which excludes lakes, ponds, glaciers > 1 km^{2} (0.386 sq mi or 247 acres) and river estuaries.

Adé (French pronunciation: [ade]; Occitan: Adèr) is a commune in the Hautes-Pyrénées department in southwestern France.

== Geography ==
Adé is a commune in the Hautes-Pyrénées and part of the agglomeration of Lourdes, 5 km (3.1 mi) north of the centre of Lourdes, itself.

The commune has a weakly extended territory of 7.24 km^{2} (2.80 sq mi), which sprawls 382 m (1,253 ft) to the north-east, where the Geune leaves the town and enters Lanne, and 583 m (1,913 ft) to the south-east, near the locality of le Sarraut.

== Transport ==
The N21 road travels through the commune, from north to south. The commune is also immediately adjacent to the south-western end of the Tarbes–Lourdes–Pyrénées Airport, to the north-east, along the N21 road.

== Sites and monuments ==
- The chapel of Notre-Dame du Rosaire.
- The church of Saint-Hippolyte of Adé and the Basilica of the Immaculate Conception de Lourdes are the works of the same architect. This building with three naves was built on the former feudal motte. The cellar of the rectory is the former armory of the castle which was built in the 11th Century. Inside, a tympanum represents the martyrdom of St. Hippolytus, patron saint of the village.
- The old château, of which remain the ancient walls.
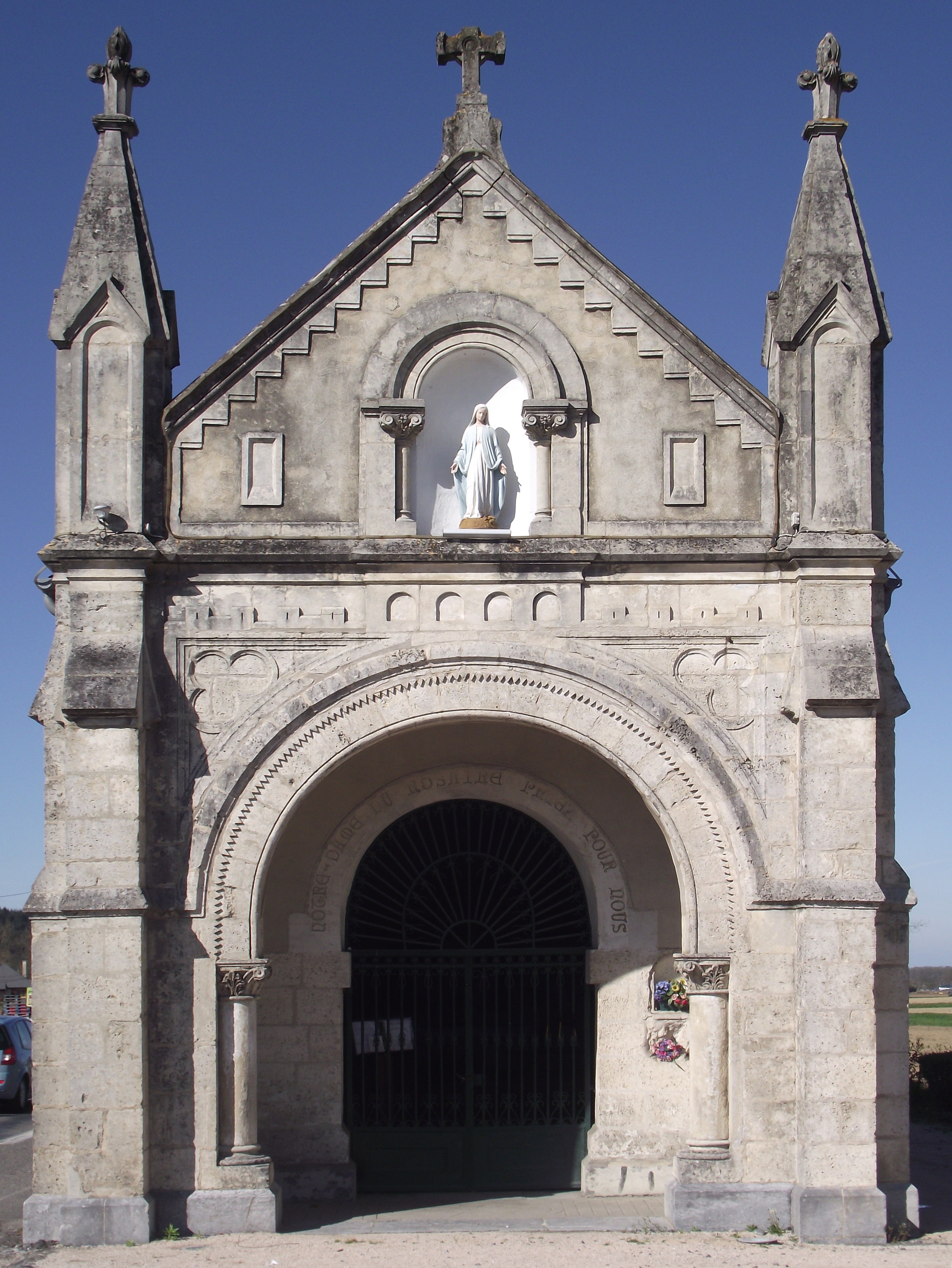
The chapel of Notre-Dame du Rosaire

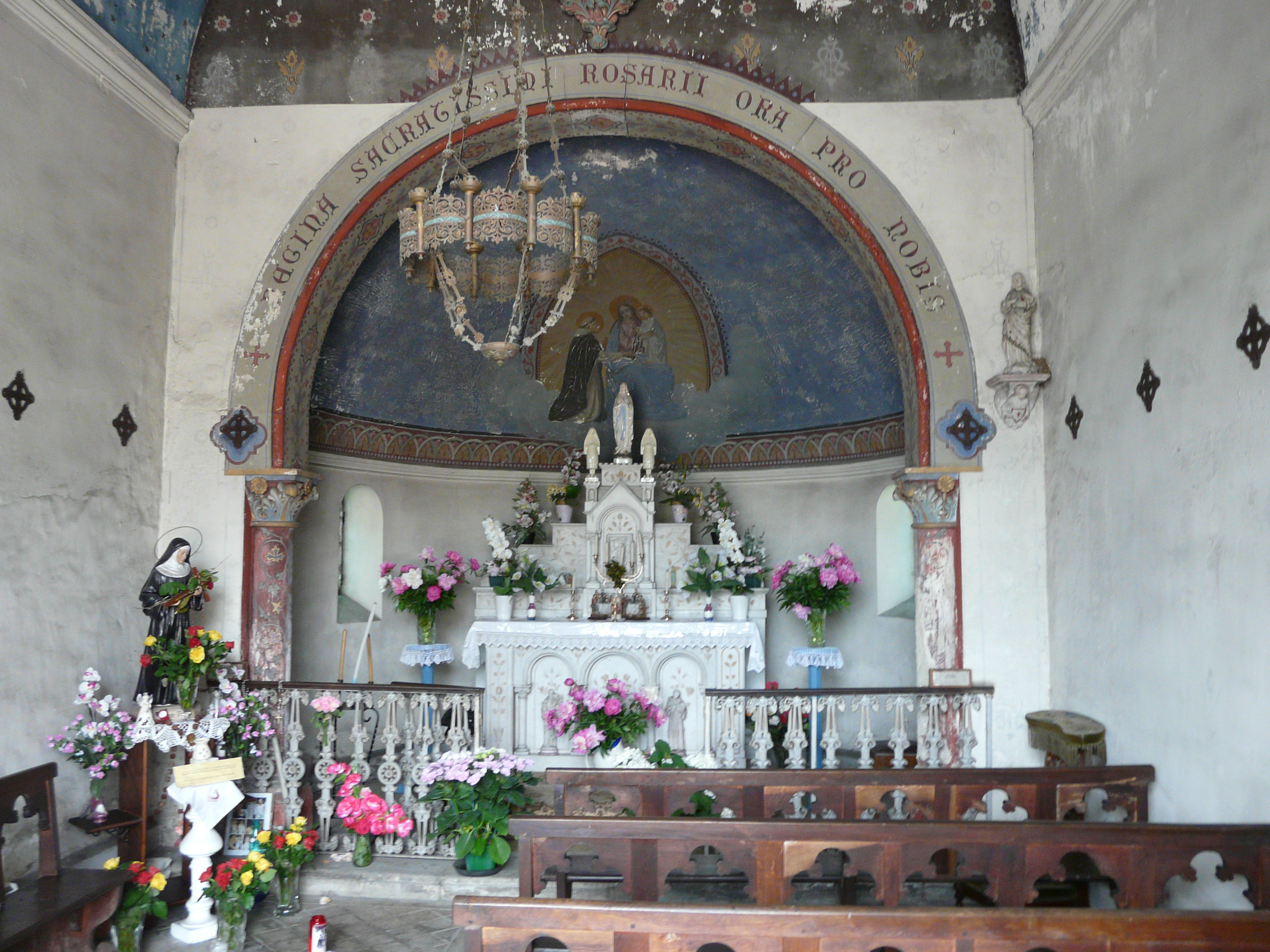
The Interior of the chapel of Notre-Dame du Rosaire

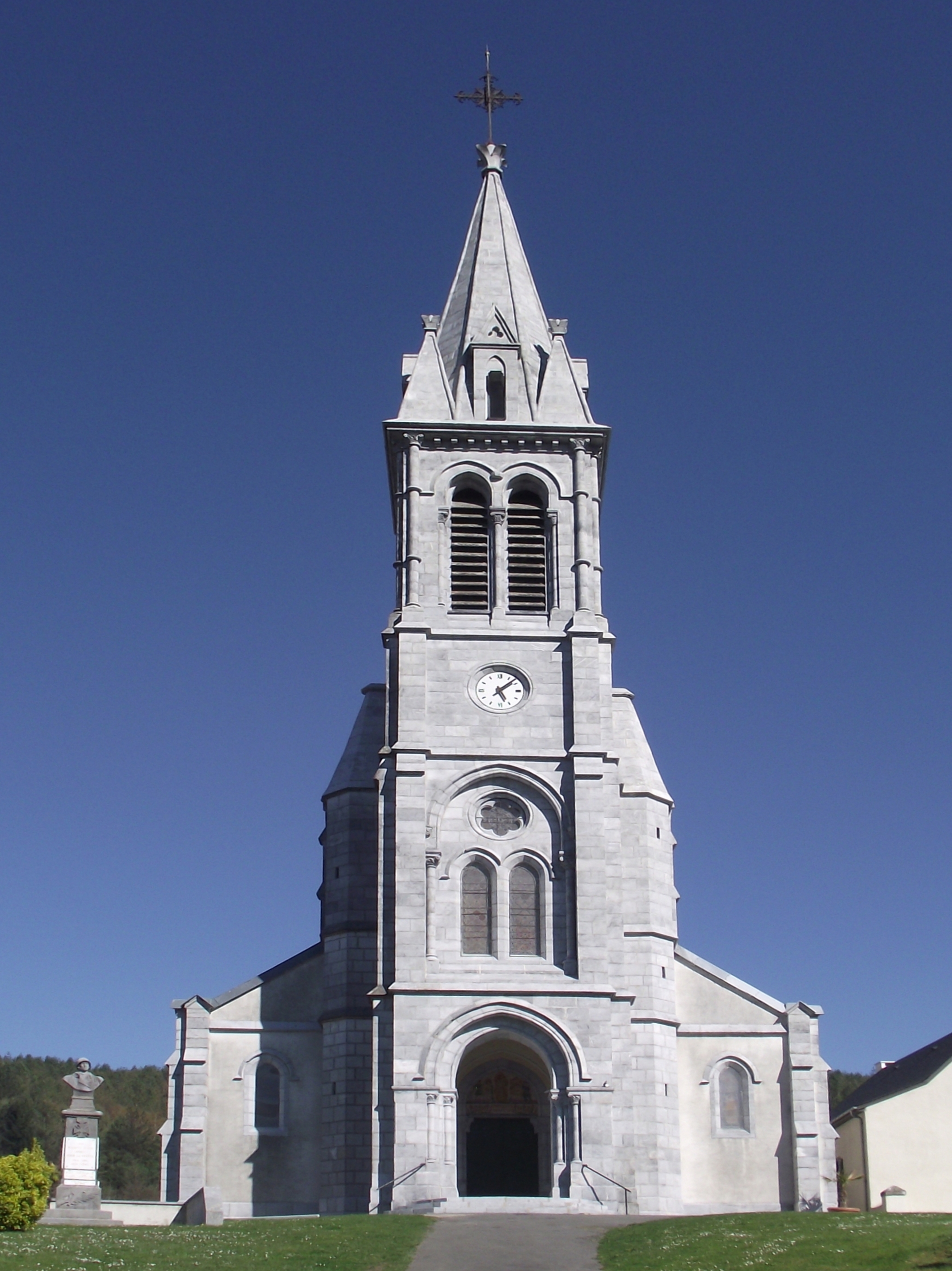
The Church of Saint-Hippolyte

== Population ==
Historical population
Year	Pop.	±% p.a.
1968	445	—
1975	465	+0.63%
1982	514	+1.44%
1990	637	+2.72%
1999	674	+0.63%
2007	731	+1.02%
2012	762	+0.83%
2017	802	+1.03%
2023	856	+1.09%
Source: INSEE

== See also ==
- Communes of the Hautes-Pyrénées department
