= Ger, Hautes-Pyrénées =

Ger
- Commune
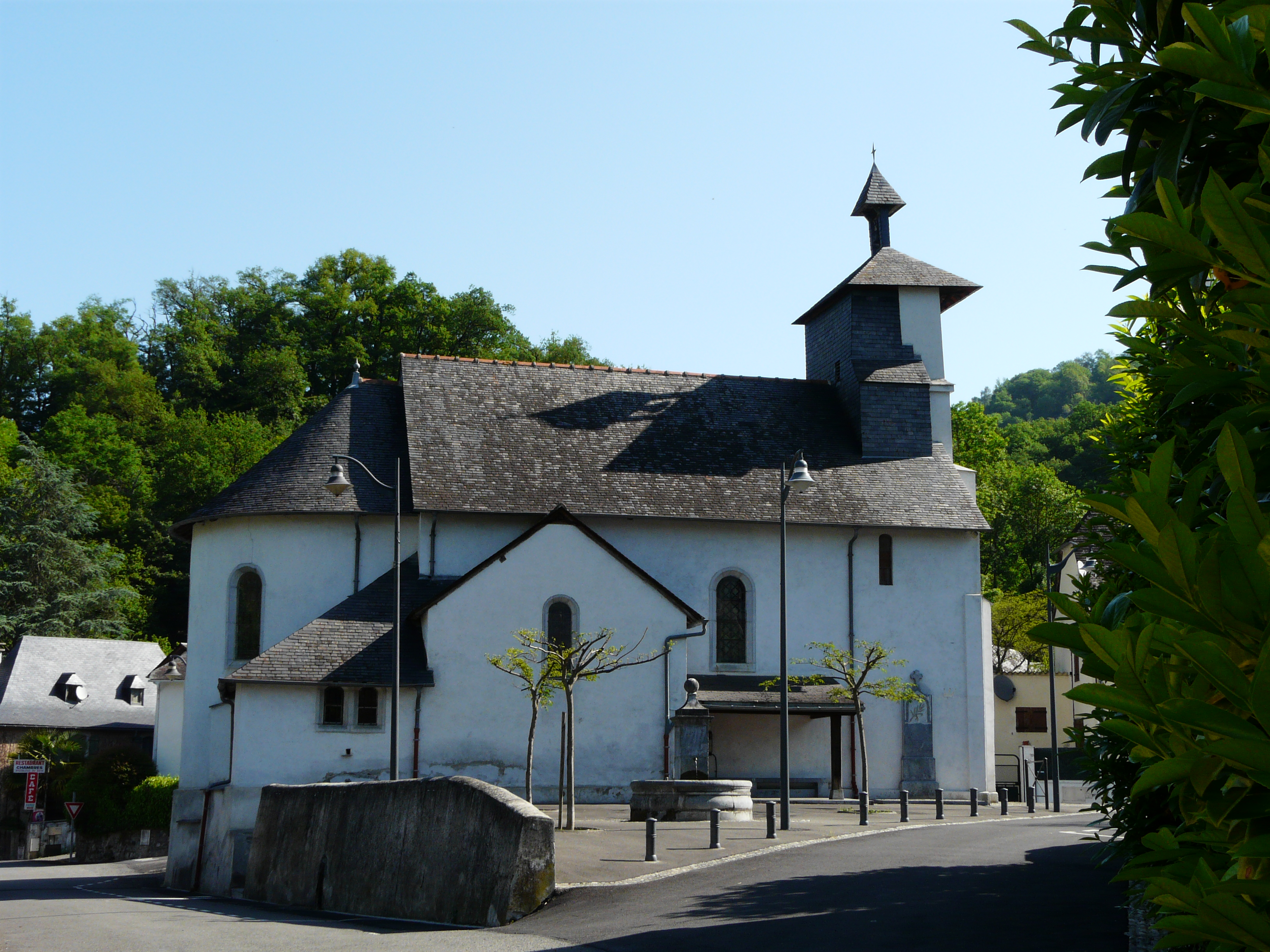
- The church of Ger

- Coat of arms
- Location of Ger
- Location within France Location within Occitanie
- Coordinates: 43°03′19″N 0°02′19″W
- Country: France
- Region: Occitania
- Department: Hautes-Pyrénées
- Arrondissement: Argelès-Gazost
- Canton: Lourdes-2
- Intercommunality: CA Tarbes-Lourdes-Pyrénées

Government
  - Mayor (2020–2026): Joseph Fourcade
- Area^{1}: 1.94 km^{2} (0.75 sq mi)
- Elevation: 290 m (950 ft)
- Highest elevation: 720 m (2,360 ft)
- Lowest elevation: 390 m (1,280 ft)
- Population (2023): 160
  - Density: 82/km^{2} (210/sq mi)
- Time zone: UTC+01:00 (CET)
  - Summer (DST): UTC+02:00 (CEST)
- INSEE/Postal code: 65197 /65100
- ^{1} French Land Register data, which excludes lakes, ponds, glaciers > 1 km^{2} (0.386 sq mi or 247 acres) and river estuaries.

Ger (French pronunciation: [ʒɛʁ]; Occitan: Gèr) is a commune in the Hautes-Pyrénées department in south-western France.

== See also ==
- Communes of the Hautes-Pyrénées department
