= Paréac =

- Commune
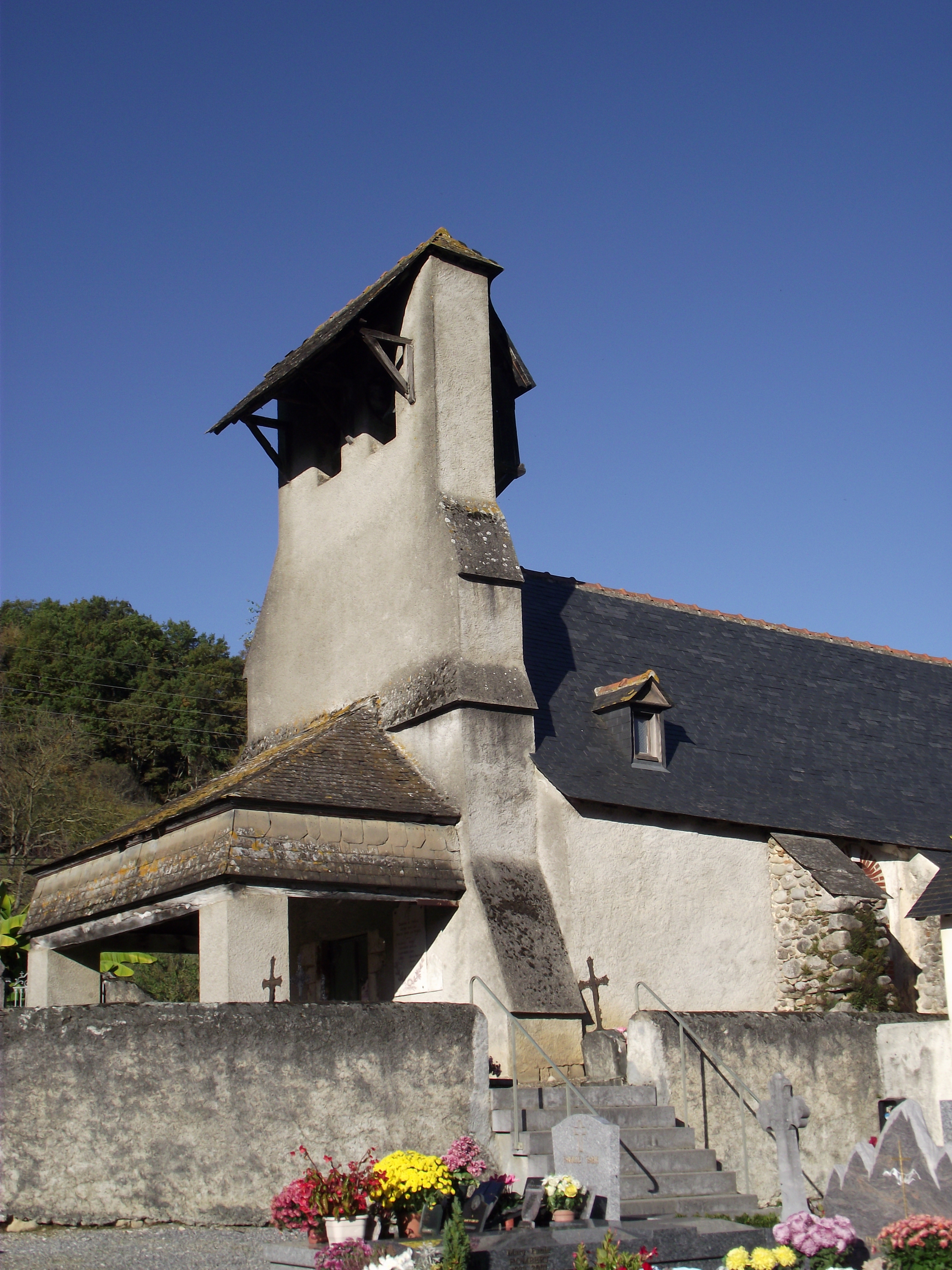
- The church of Notre-Dame de l'Assomption

- Coat of arms
- Location of Paréac
- Location within France Location within Occitanie
- Coordinates: 43°07′00″N 0°01′29″E
- Country: France
- Region: Occitania
- Department: Hautes-Pyrénées
- Arrondissement: Argelès-Gazost
- Canton: Lourdes-2
- Intercommunality: CA Tarbes-Lourdes-Pyrénées

Government
  - Mayor (2020–2026): Christelle Coatrine
- Area^{1}: 2.42 km^{2} (0.93 sq mi)
- Elevation: 500 m (1,600 ft)
- Highest elevation: 600 m (2,000 ft)
- Lowest elevation: 387 m (1,270 ft)
- Population (2023): 73
  - Density: 30/km^{2} (78/sq mi)
- Time zone: UTC+01:00 (CET)
  - Summer (DST): UTC+02:00 (CEST)
- INSEE/Postal code: 65355 /65100
- ^{1} French Land Register data, which excludes lakes, ponds, glaciers > 1 km^{2} (0.386 sq mi or 247 acres) and river estuaries.

Paréac (French pronunciation: [paʁeak]; Occitan: Pariac) is a commune in the Hautes-Pyrénées department in south-western France.

== See also ==
- Communes of the Hautes-Pyrénées department
