= Ousté =

- Commune
- Coat of arms
- Location of Ousté
- Location within France Location within Occitanie
- Coordinates: 43°03′01″N 0°00′42″W
- Country: France
- Region: Occitania
- Department: Hautes-Pyrénées
- Arrondissement: Argelès-Gazost
- Canton: Lourdes-2
- Intercommunality: CA Tarbes-Lourdes-Pyrénées

Government
  - Mayor (2020–2026): Jean-Pierre Frechin
- Area^{1}: 2.35 km^{2} (0.91 sq mi)
- Elevation: 700 m (2,300 ft)
- Highest elevation: 1,000 m (3,300 ft)
- Lowest elevation: 478 m (1,568 ft)
- Population (2023): 35
  - Density: 15/km^{2} (39/sq mi)
- Time zone: UTC+01:00 (CET)
  - Summer (DST): UTC+02:00 (CEST)
- INSEE/Postal code: 65351 /65100
- ^{1} French Land Register data, which excludes lakes, ponds, glaciers > 1 km^{2} (0.386 sq mi or 247 acres) and river estuaries.

Ousté (French pronunciation: [uste]; Occitan: Ostèr) is a commune in the Hautes-Pyrénées department in south-western France.

== See also ==
- Communes of the Hautes-Pyrénées department
