= Arcizac-ez-Angles =

- Commune
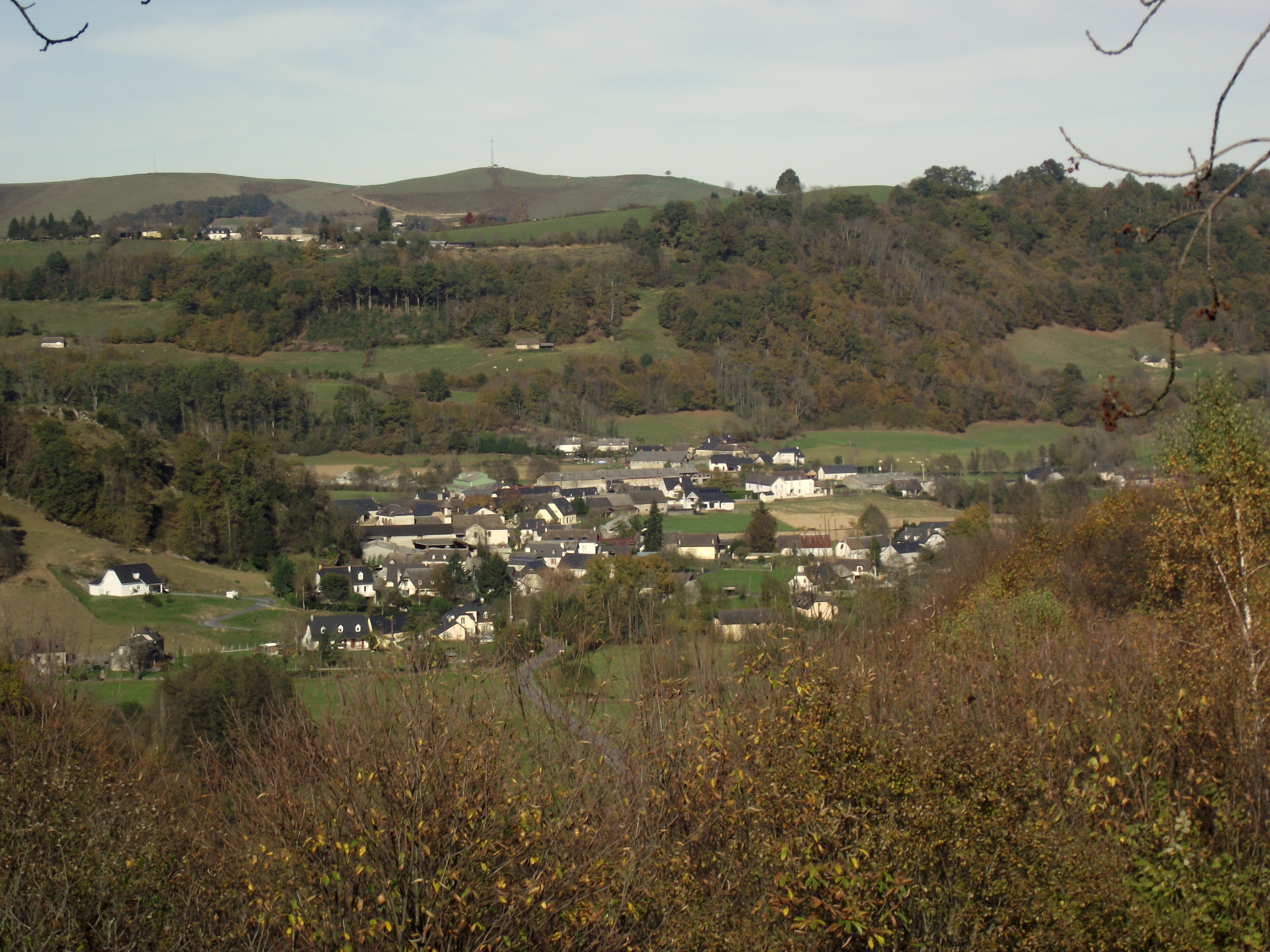
- Arcizac-ez-Angles seen from the hillside

- Coat of arms
- Location of Arcizac-ez-Angles
- Location within France Location within Occitanie
- Coordinates: 43°05′38″N 0°00′44″E
- Country: France
- Region: Occitania
- Department: Hautes-Pyrénées
- Arrondissement: Argelès-Gazost
- Canton: Lourdes-2
- Intercommunality: CA Tarbes-Lourdes-Pyrénées

Government
  - Mayor (2023–2026): Ginette Hourné-Raoubet
- Area^{1}: 1.93 km^{2} (0.75 sq mi)
- Elevation: 408 m (1,339 ft)
- Highest elevation: 535 m (1,755 ft)
- Lowest elevation: 380 m (1,250 ft)
- Population (2023): 248
  - Density: 128/km^{2} (333/sq mi)
- Time zone: UTC+01:00 (CET)
  - Summer (DST): UTC+02:00 (CEST)
- INSEE/Postal code: 65020 /65100
- ^{1} French Land Register data, which excludes lakes, ponds, glaciers > 1 km^{2} (0.386 sq mi or 247 acres) and river estuaries.

Arcizac-ez-Angles (French pronunciation: [aʁsizak ez‿ɑ̃ɡl]; Occitan: Arcisac eths Angles) is a commune in the Hautes-Pyrénées department in southwestern France.

== Population ==
Historical population
Year	Pop.	±% p.a.
1968	138	—
1975	130	−0.85%
1982	127	−0.33%
1990	157	+2.69%
1999	191	+2.20%
2007	247	+3.27%
2012	262	+1.19%
2017	259	−0.23%
2023	248	−0.72%
Source: INSEE

== See also ==
- Communes of the Hautes-Pyrénées department
