= Canton of Lourdes-1 =

Coordinates: 43.10°N 0.05°W

The canton of Lourdes-1 is an administrative division of the Hautes-Pyrénées department, southwestern France. It was created at the French canton reorganisation which came into effect in March 2015. Its seat is in Lourdes.

It consists of the following communes:

1. Aspin-en-Lavedan
2. Barlest
3. Bartrès
4. Loubajac
5. Lourdes (partly)
6. Omex
7. Ossen
8. Peyrouse
9. Poueyferré
10. Saint-Pé-de-Bigorre
11. Ségus
12. Viger
