= Barlest =

- Commune
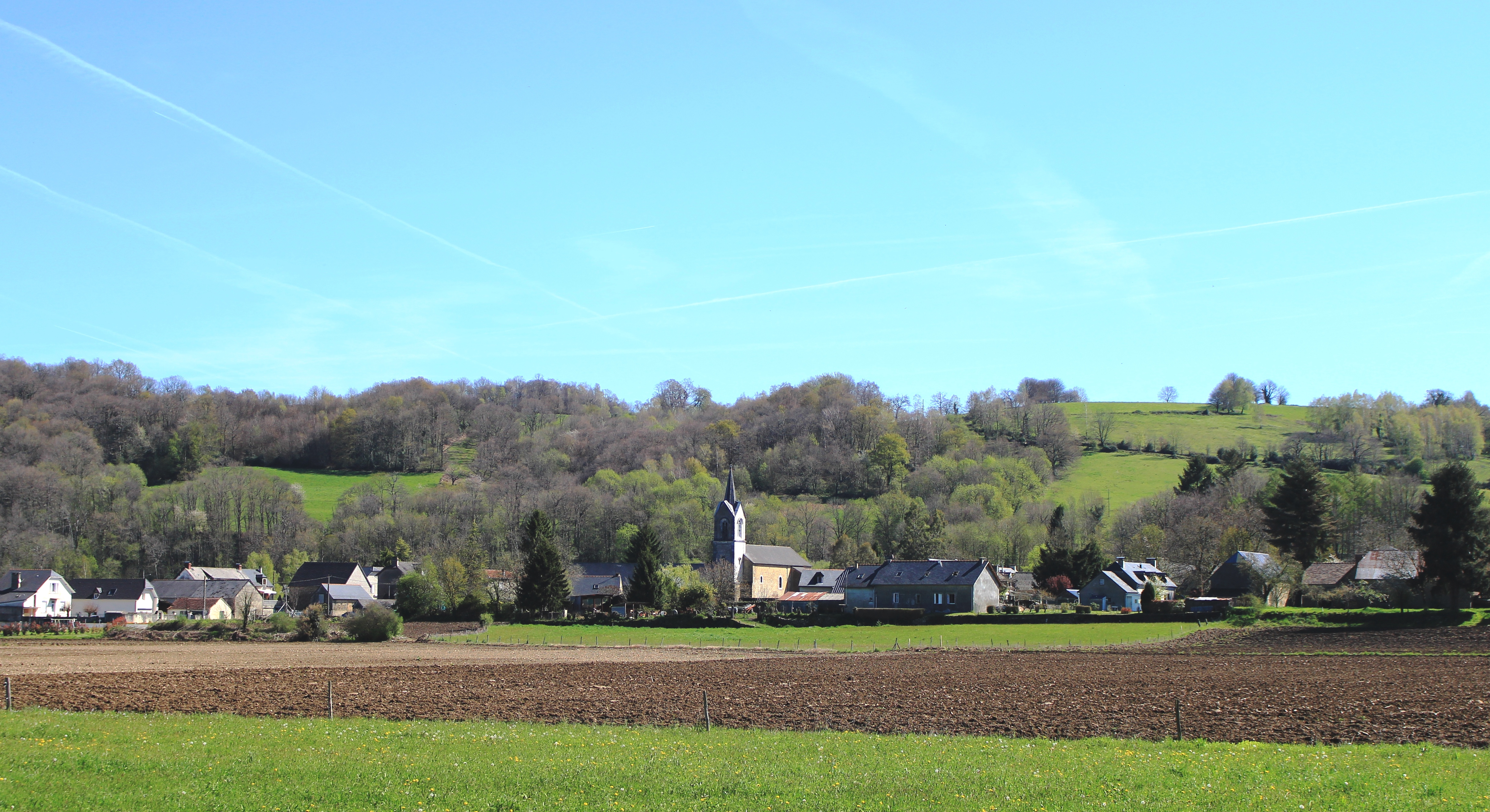
- View of the village.

- Coat of arms
- Location of Barlest
- Location within France Location within Occitanie
- Coordinates: 43°09′07″N 0°05′26″W
- Country: France
- Region: Occitania
- Department: Hautes-Pyrénées
- Arrondissement: Argelès-Gazost
- Canton: Lourdes-1
- Intercommunality: CA Tarbes-Lourdes-Pyrénées

Government
  - Mayor (2020–2026): Francis Lafon-Puyo
- Area^{1}: 4.02 km^{2} (1.55 sq mi)
- Elevation: 839 m (2,753 ft)
- Highest elevation: 513 m (1,683 ft)
- Lowest elevation: 385 m (1,263 ft)
- Population (2023): 334
  - Density: 83.1/km^{2} (215/sq mi)
- Time zone: UTC+01:00 (CET)
  - Summer (DST): UTC+02:00 (CEST)
- INSEE/Postal code: 65065 /65100
- ^{1} French Land Register data, which excludes lakes, ponds, glaciers > 1 km^{2} (0.386 sq mi or 247 acres) and river estuaries.

Barlest (French pronunciation: [baʁlɛst]) is a commune in the Hautes-Pyrénées department in southwestern France.

== Population ==
Historical population
Year	Pop.	±% p.a.
1968	187	—
1975	198	+0.82%
1982	206	+0.57%
1990	233	+1.55%
1999	223	−0.49%
2007	251	+1.49%
2012	286	+2.65%
2017	290	+0.28%
2023	334	+2.38%
Source: INSEE

== See also ==
- Communes of the Hautes-Pyrénées department
