= Jarret, Hautes-Pyrénées =

Jarret
- Commune
- Coat of arms
- Location of Jarret
- Location within France Location within Occitanie
- Coordinates: 43°04′56″N 0°00′47″W
- Country: France
- Region: Occitania
- Department: Hautes-Pyrénées
- Arrondissement: Argelès-Gazost
- Canton: Lourdes-2
- Intercommunality: CA Tarbes-Lourdes-Pyrénées

Government
  - Mayor (2020–2026): Ange Mur
- Area^{1}: 4.44 km^{2} (1.71 sq mi)
- Elevation: 500 m (1,600 ft)
- Highest elevation: 860 m (2,820 ft)
- Lowest elevation: 439 m (1,440 ft)
- Population (2023): 299
  - Density: 67.3/km^{2} (174/sq mi)
- Time zone: UTC+01:00 (CET)
  - Summer (DST): UTC+02:00 (CEST)
- INSEE/Postal code: 65233 /65100
- ^{1} French Land Register data, which excludes lakes, ponds, glaciers > 1 km^{2} (0.386 sq mi or 247 acres) and river estuaries.

Jarret (French pronunciation: [ʒaʁɛ]) is a commune in the Hautes-Pyrénées department in south-western France.

== See also ==
- Communes of the Hautes-Pyrénées department
