= Geu =

- Commune
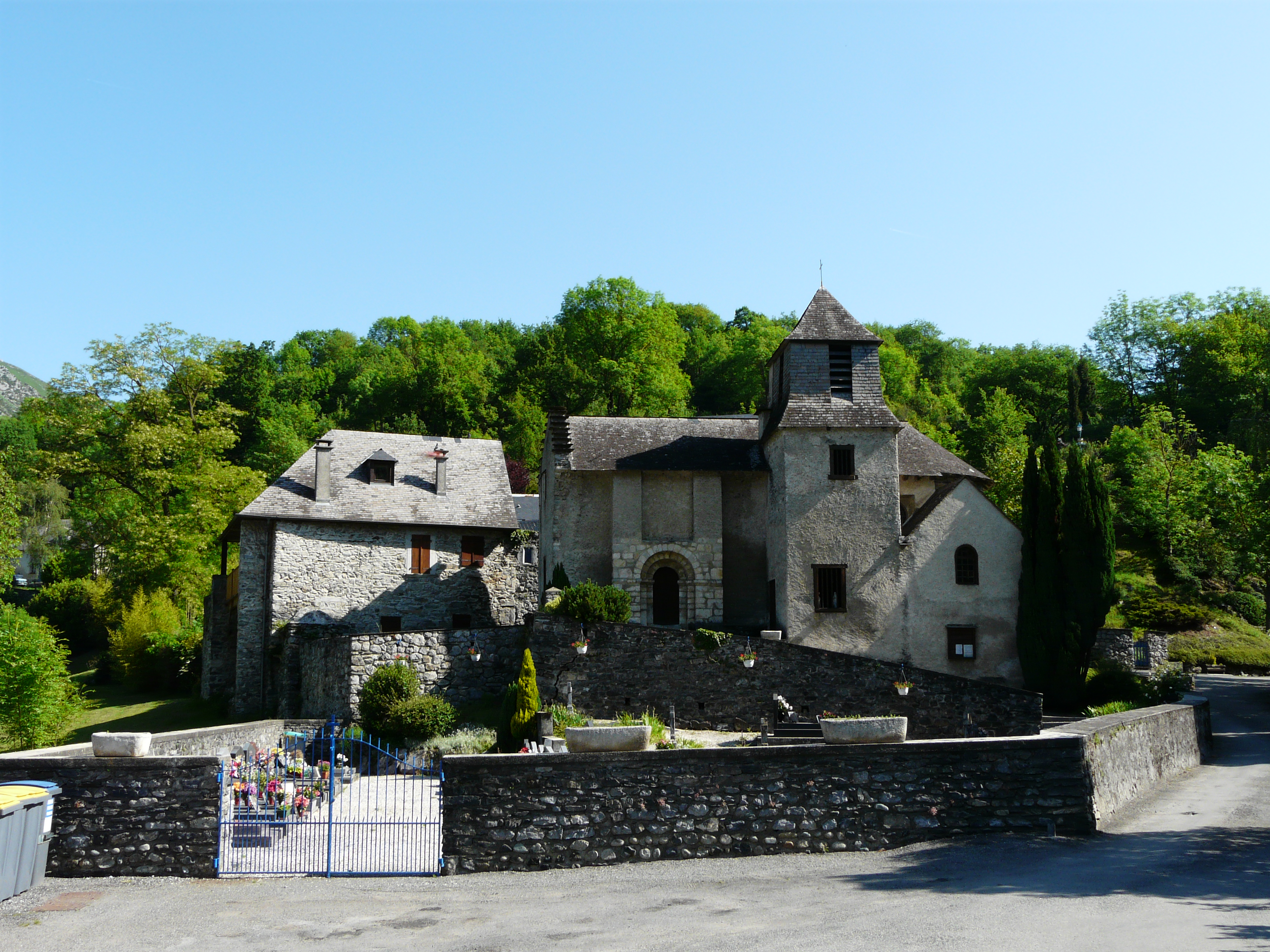
- The church of Saint-Martin

- Coat of arms
- Location of Geu
- Location within France Location within Occitanie
- Coordinates: 43°02′27″N 0°02′56″W
- Country: France
- Region: Occitania
- Department: Hautes-Pyrénées
- Arrondissement: Argelès-Gazost
- Canton: Lourdes-2
- Intercommunality: CA Tarbes-Lourdes-Pyrénées

Government
  - Mayor (2020–2026): Jean-Claude Castérot
- Area^{1}: 2.67 km^{2} (1.03 sq mi)
- Elevation: 400 m (1,300 ft)
- Highest elevation: 779 m (2,556 ft)
- Lowest elevation: 386 m (1,266 ft)
- Population (2023): 186
  - Density: 69.7/km^{2} (180/sq mi)
- Time zone: UTC+01:00 (CET)
  - Summer (DST): UTC+02:00 (CEST)
- INSEE/Postal code: 65201 /65100
- ^{1} French Land Register data, which excludes lakes, ponds, glaciers > 1 km^{2} (0.386 sq mi or 247 acres) and river estuaries.

Geu (French pronunciation: [ʒø]) is a commune in the Hautes-Pyrénées department in south-western France.

== See also ==
- Communes of the Hautes-Pyrénées department
