= Artigues, Hautes-Pyrénées =

Artigues
- Commune
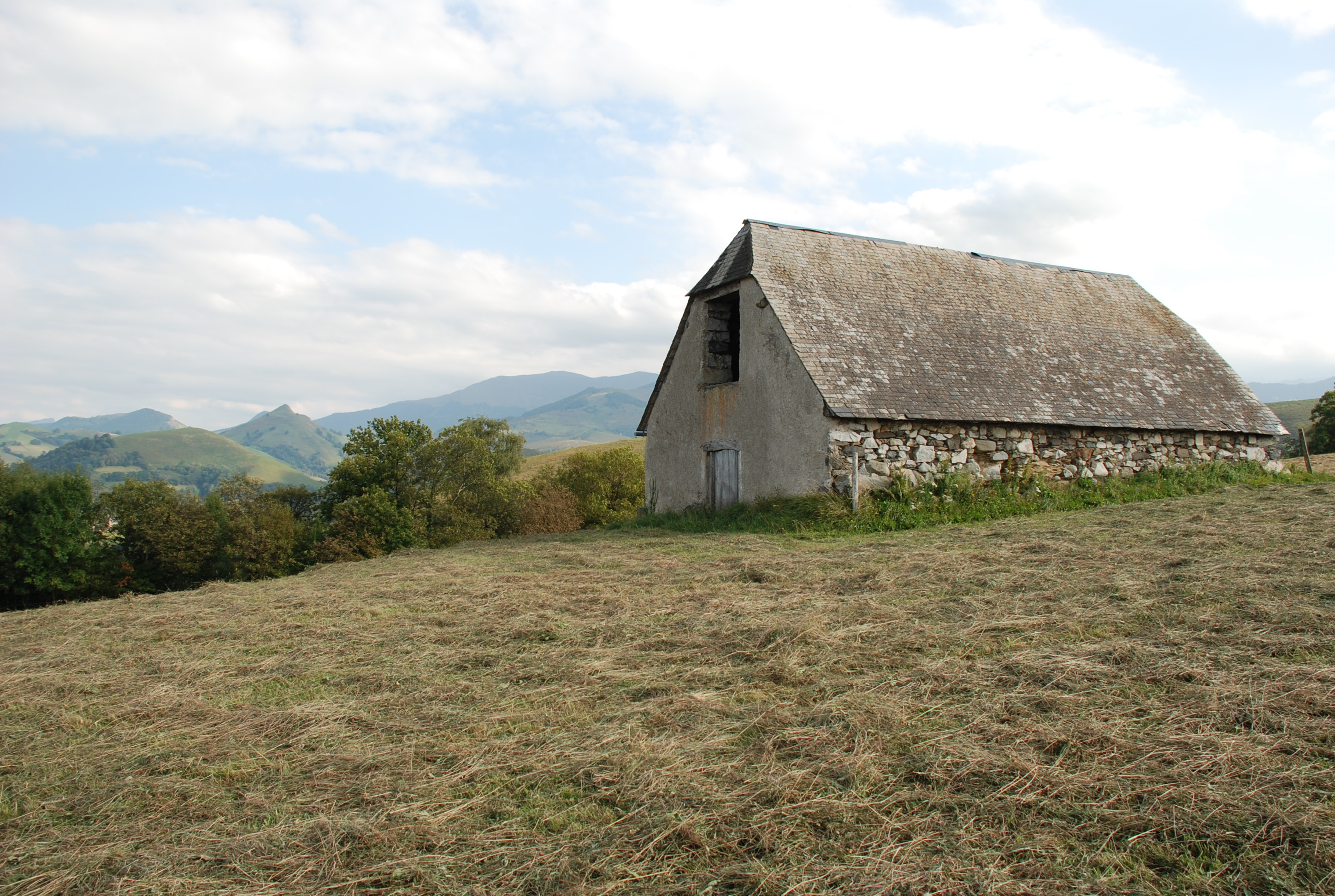
- A barn adjacent to the Artigues airstrip

- Coat of arms
- Location of Artigues
- Location within France Location within Occitanie
- Coordinates: 43°04′32″N 0°00′11″E
- Country: France
- Region: Occitania
- Department: Hautes-Pyrénées
- Arrondissement: Argelès-Gazost
- Canton: Lourdes-2
- Intercommunality: CA Tarbes-Lourdes-Pyrénées

Government
  - Mayor (2020–2026): Marie Plane
- Area^{1}: 1.46 km^{2} (0.56 sq mi)
- Elevation: 600 m (2,000 ft)
- Highest elevation: 860 m (2,820 ft)
- Lowest elevation: 485 m (1,591 ft)
- Population (2023): 13
  - Density: 8.9/km^{2} (23/sq mi)
- Time zone: UTC+01:00 (CET)
  - Summer (DST): UTC+02:00 (CEST)
- INSEE/Postal code: 65038 /65100
- ^{1} French Land Register data, which excludes lakes, ponds, glaciers > 1 km^{2} (0.386 sq mi or 247 acres) and river estuaries.

Artigues (French pronunciation: [aʁtiɡ]; Occitan: Artigas) is a commune in the Hautes-Pyrénées department in southwestern France.

It is a small village retaining traditional architecture of the region. The commune is at the end of a steep dead-end road from the outskirts of Luchon.

== Geography ==
=== Climate ===
Artigues has an oceanic climate (Köppen climate classification Cfb). The average annual temperature in Artigues is 7.7 °C (45.9 °F). The average annual rainfall is 1,220.8 mm (48.06 in) with November as the wettest month. The temperatures are highest on average in August, at around 14.6 °C (58.3 °F), and lowest in January, at around 1.2 °C (34.2 °F). The highest temperature ever recorded in Artigues was 33.0 °C (91.4 °F) on 1 July 2015; the coldest temperature ever recorded was −20.0 °C (−4.0 °F) on 9 January 1985.

Climate data for Artigues (1981−2010 normals, extremes 1959−2015)
Month	Jan	Feb	Mar	Apr	May	Jun	Jul	Aug	Sep	Oct	Nov	Dec	Year
Record high °C (°F)	17.0 (62.6)	26.0 (78.8)	22.0 (71.6)	24.5 (76.1)	29.0 (84.2)	33.0 (91.4)	33.0 (91.4)	32.5 (90.5)	30.0 (86.0)	26.5 (79.7)	22.0 (71.6)	19.0 (66.2)	33.0 (91.4)
Mean daily maximum °C (°F)	4.2 (39.6)	5.5 (41.9)	8.1 (46.6)	9.5 (49.1)	12.8 (55.0)	16.2 (61.2)	18.7 (65.7)	18.7 (65.7)	16.1 (61.0)	13.3 (55.9)	7.9 (46.2)	5.0 (41.0)	11.4 (52.5)
Daily mean °C (°F)	1.2 (34.2)	1.9 (35.4)	4.1 (39.4)	5.6 (42.1)	9.0 (48.2)	12.4 (54.3)	14.6 (58.3)	14.6 (58.3)	12.3 (54.1)	9.6 (49.3)	4.8 (40.6)	2.1 (35.8)	7.7 (45.9)
Mean daily minimum °C (°F)	−1.9 (28.6)	−1.6 (29.1)	0.1 (32.2)	1.8 (35.2)	5.2 (41.4)	8.5 (47.3)	10.4 (50.7)	10.6 (51.1)	8.4 (47.1)	5.8 (42.4)	1.7 (35.1)	−0.9 (30.4)	4.0 (39.2)
Record low °C (°F)	−20.0 (−4.0)	−16.1 (3.0)	−15.0 (5.0)	−10.0 (14.0)	−5.0 (23.0)	−2.0 (28.4)	1.8 (35.2)	1.0 (33.8)	−2.0 (28.4)	−7.0 (19.4)	−11.0 (12.2)	−15.0 (5.0)	−20.0 (−4.0)
Average precipitation mm (inches)	118.4 (4.66)	85.4 (3.36)	96.9 (3.81)	112.3 (4.42)	113.4 (4.46)	93.9 (3.70)	73.3 (2.89)	77.7 (3.06)	88.9 (3.50)	104.5 (4.11)	134.7 (5.30)	121.4 (4.78)	1,220.8 (48.06)
Average precipitation days (≥ 1.0 mm)	11.9	10.7	12.2	15.0	15.4	13.0	10.9	11.2	10.6	13.1	12.6	11.9	148.4
Source: Météo-France

== Population ==
Historical population
Year	Pop.	±% p.a.
1968	30	—
1975	30	+0.00%
1982	27	−1.49%
1990	24	−1.46%
1999	29	+2.12%
2007	22	−3.39%
2012	23	+0.89%
2017	16	−7.00%
2023	13	−3.40%
Source: INSEE

== See also ==
- Communes of the Hautes-Pyrénées department
