= Ourdon =

- Commune
- Coat of arms
- Location of Ourdon
- Location within France Location within Occitanie
- Coordinates: 43°02′12″N 0°00′51″W
- Country: France
- Region: Occitania
- Department: Hautes-Pyrénées
- Arrondissement: Argelès-Gazost
- Canton: Lourdes-2
- Intercommunality: Tarbes-Lourdes-Pyrénées

Government
  - Mayor (2020–2026): Jean-Louis Crampe
- Area^{1}: 2.66 km^{2} (1.03 sq mi)
- Elevation: 743 m (2,438 ft)
- Highest elevation: 1,400 m (4,600 ft)
- Lowest elevation: 560 m (1,840 ft)
- Population (2023): 11
  - Density: 4.1/km^{2} (11/sq mi)
- Time zone: UTC+01:00 (CET)
  - Summer (DST): UTC+02:00 (CEST)
- INSEE/Postal code: 65349 /65100
- ^{1} French Land Register data, which excludes lakes, ponds, glaciers > 1 km^{2} (0.386 sq mi or 247 acres) and river estuaries.

Ourdon (French pronunciation: [uʁdɔ̃]; Occitan: Ordon) is a commune in the Hautes-Pyrénées department in south-western France.

== Population ==
Historical population
Year	Pop.	±% p.a.
1968	17	—
1975	16	−0.86%
1982	17	+0.87%
1990	9	−7.64%
1999	6	−4.41%
2007	7	+1.95%
2012	9	+5.15%
2017	7	−4.90%
2023	11	+7.82%
Source: INSEE

== See also ==
- Communes of the Hautes-Pyrénées department
