= Germs-sur-l'Oussouet =

- Commune
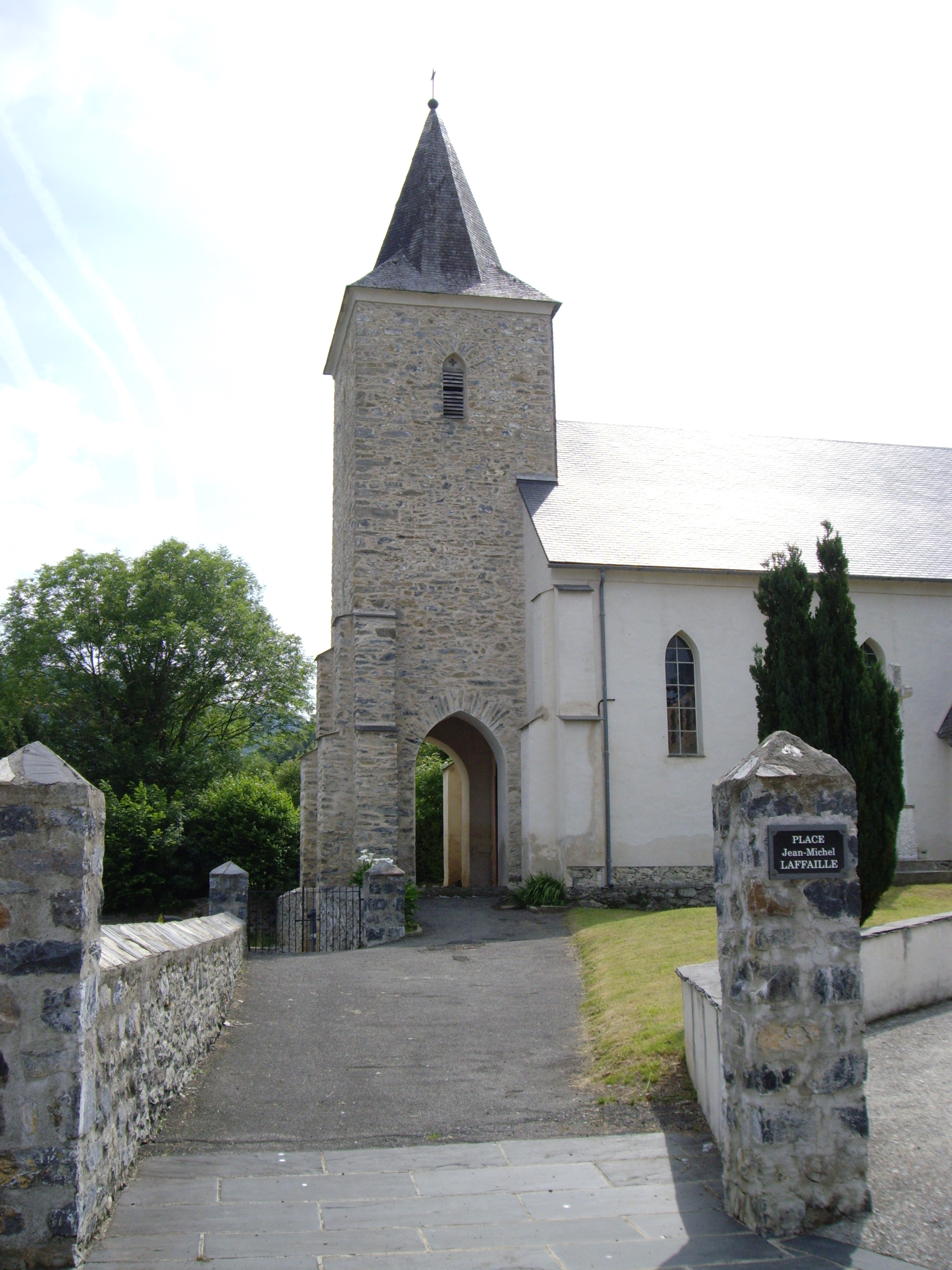
- The church of Saint-Jacques

- Coat of arms
- Location of Germs-sur-l'Oussouet
- Location within France Location within Occitanie
- Coordinates: 43°03′08″N 0°03′31″E
- Country: France
- Region: Occitania
- Department: Hautes-Pyrénées
- Arrondissement: Argelès-Gazost
- Canton: Lourdes-2
- Intercommunality: CA Tarbes-Lourdes-Pyrénées

Government
  - Mayor (2020–2026): Serge Bourdette
- Area^{1}: 12.96 km^{2} (5.00 sq mi)
- Elevation: 800 m (2,600 ft)
- Highest elevation: 1,499 m (4,918 ft)
- Lowest elevation: 555 m (1,821 ft)
- Population (2023): 99
  - Density: 7.6/km^{2} (20/sq mi)
- Time zone: UTC+01:00 (CET)
  - Summer (DST): UTC+02:00 (CEST)
- INSEE/Postal code: 65200 /65200
- ^{1} French Land Register data, which excludes lakes, ponds, glaciers > 1 km^{2} (0.386 sq mi or 247 acres) and river estuaries.

Germs-sur-l'Oussouet (French pronunciation: [ʒɛʁm syʁ luswɛ]; Occitan: Gèrms) is a commune in the Hautes-Pyrénées department in south-western France.

== See also ==
- Communes of the Hautes-Pyrénées department
