= Ségus =

- Commune
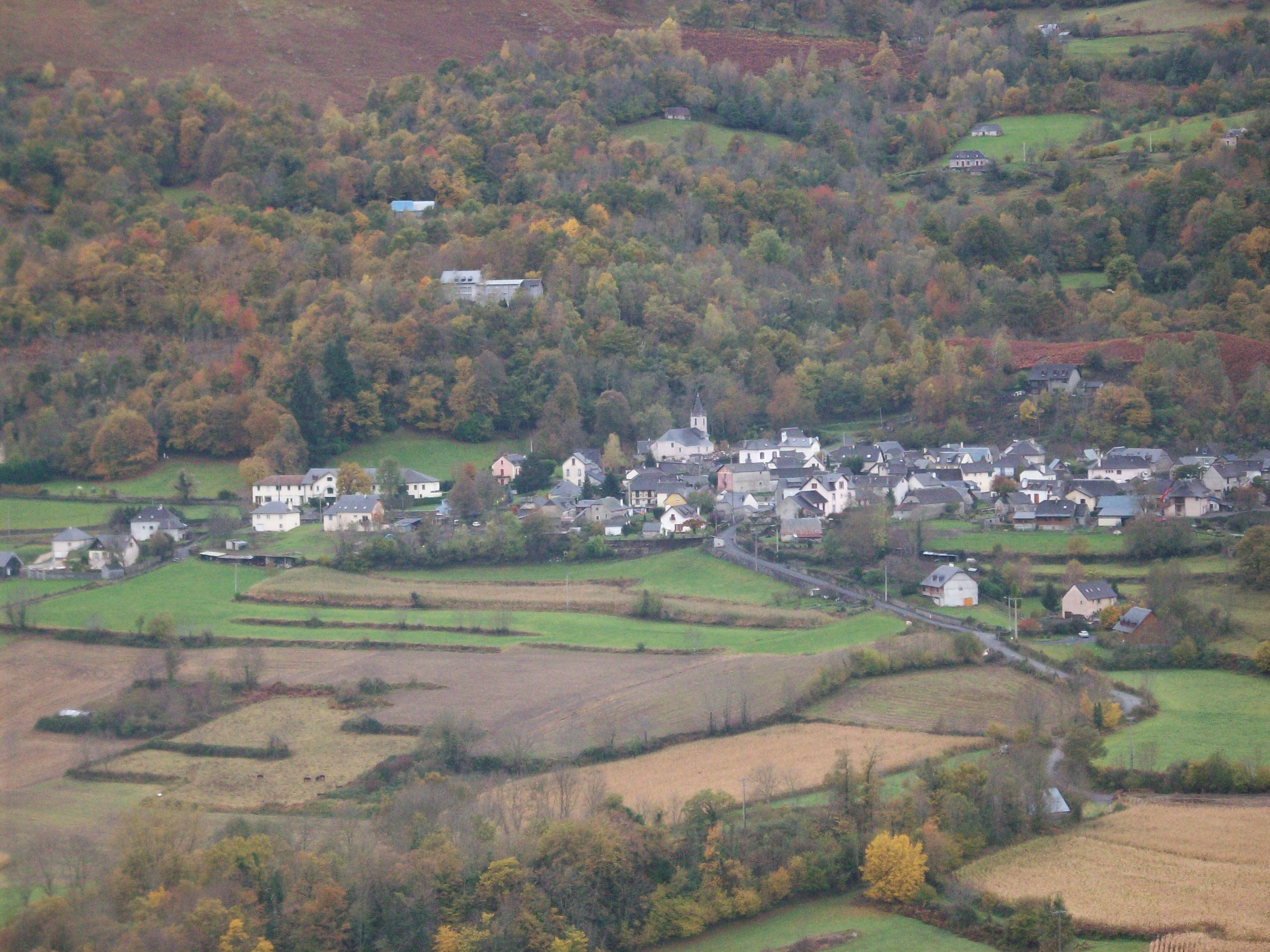
- A view of the village

- Coat of arms
- Location of Ségus
- Location within France Location within Occitanie
- Coordinates: 43°04′15″N 0°04′32″W
- Country: France
- Region: Occitania
- Department: Hautes-Pyrénées
- Arrondissement: Argelès-Gazost
- Canton: Lourdes-1
- Intercommunality: CA Tarbes-Lourdes-Pyrénées

Government
  - Mayor (2020–2026): Lucien Bouzet
- Area^{1}: 10.72 km^{2} (4.14 sq mi)
- Elevation: 540 m (1,770 ft)
- Highest elevation: 1,523 m (4,997 ft)
- Lowest elevation: 434 m (1,424 ft)
- Population (2023): 268
  - Density: 25.0/km^{2} (64.7/sq mi)
- Time zone: UTC+01:00 (CET)
  - Summer (DST): UTC+02:00 (CEST)
- INSEE/Postal code: 65415 /65100
- ^{1} French Land Register data, which excludes lakes, ponds, glaciers > 1 km^{2} (0.386 sq mi or 247 acres) and river estuaries.

Ségus (French pronunciation: [seɡys]; Occitan: Segús) is a commune in the Hautes-Pyrénées department in south-western France.

== See also ==
- Communes of the Hautes-Pyrénées department
