= Ourdis-Cotdoussan =

- Commune
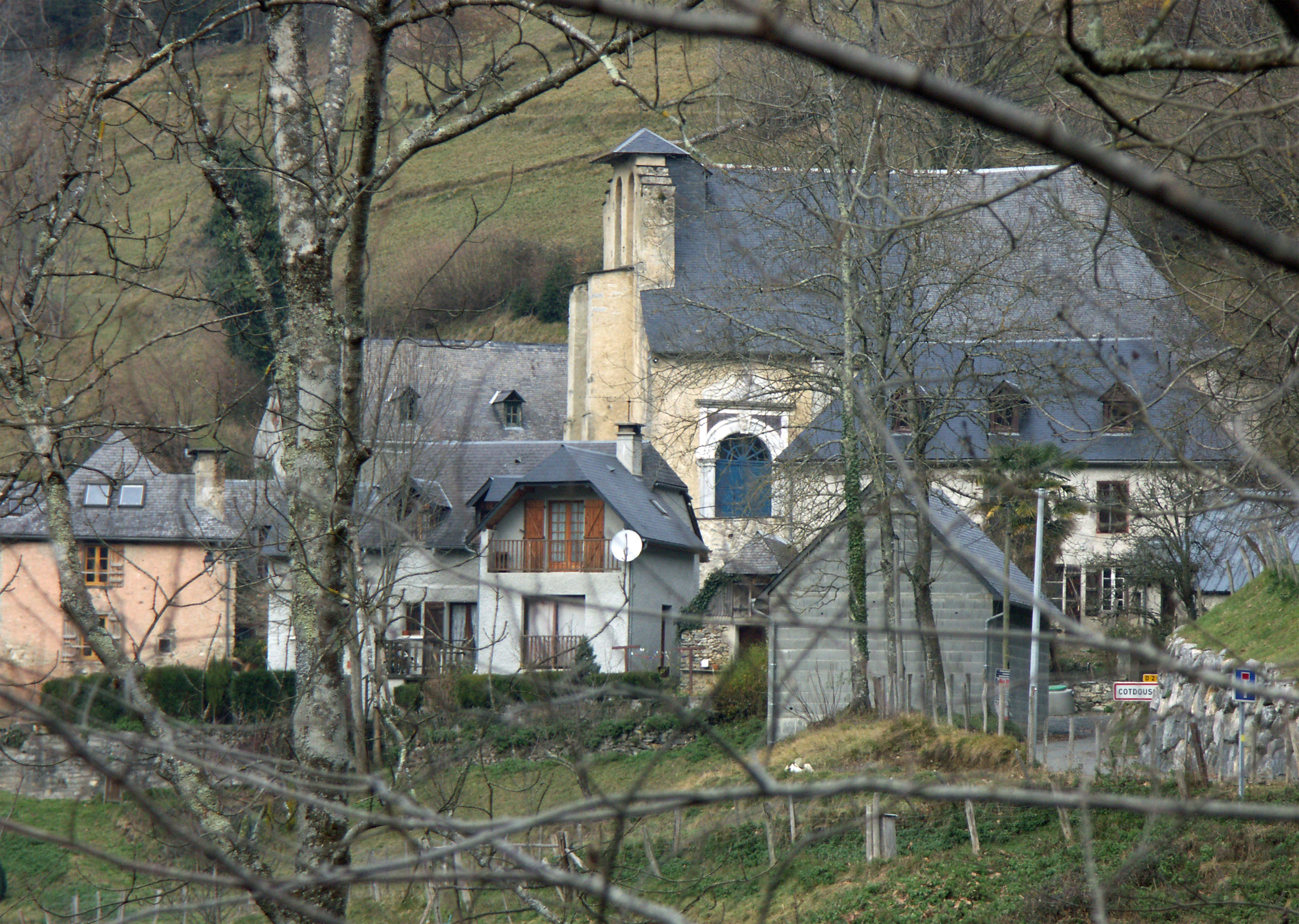
- The hamlet of Cotdoussan and the church of Saint-Jacques

- Coat of arms
- Location of Ourdis-Cotdoussan
- Location within France Location within Occitanie
- Coordinates: 43°02′51″N 0°01′22″E
- Country: France
- Region: Occitania
- Department: Hautes-Pyrénées
- Arrondissement: Argelès-Gazost
- Canton: Lourdes-2
- Intercommunality: CA Tarbes-Lourdes-Pyrénées

Government
  - Mayor (2020–2026): Jean-Noël Cassou
- Area^{1}: 4.85 km^{2} (1.87 sq mi)
- Elevation: 610 m (2,000 ft)
- Highest elevation: 1,499 m (4,918 ft)
- Lowest elevation: 594 m (1,949 ft)
- Population (2023): 41
  - Density: 8.5/km^{2} (22/sq mi)
- Time zone: UTC+01:00 (CET)
  - Summer (DST): UTC+02:00 (CEST)
- INSEE/Postal code: 65348 /65100
- ^{1} French Land Register data, which excludes lakes, ponds, glaciers > 1 km^{2} (0.386 sq mi or 247 acres) and river estuaries.

Ourdis-Cotdoussan (French pronunciation: [uʁdis kɔdusɑ̃]; Occitan: Ordins e Còth d'Ossan) is a commune in the Hautes-Pyrénées department in south-western France.

== See also ==
- Communes of the Hautes-Pyrénées department
