= Arrondissement of Argelès-Gazost =

Coordinates: 43°00′N 0°06′W

Argelès-Gazost
- Arrondissement
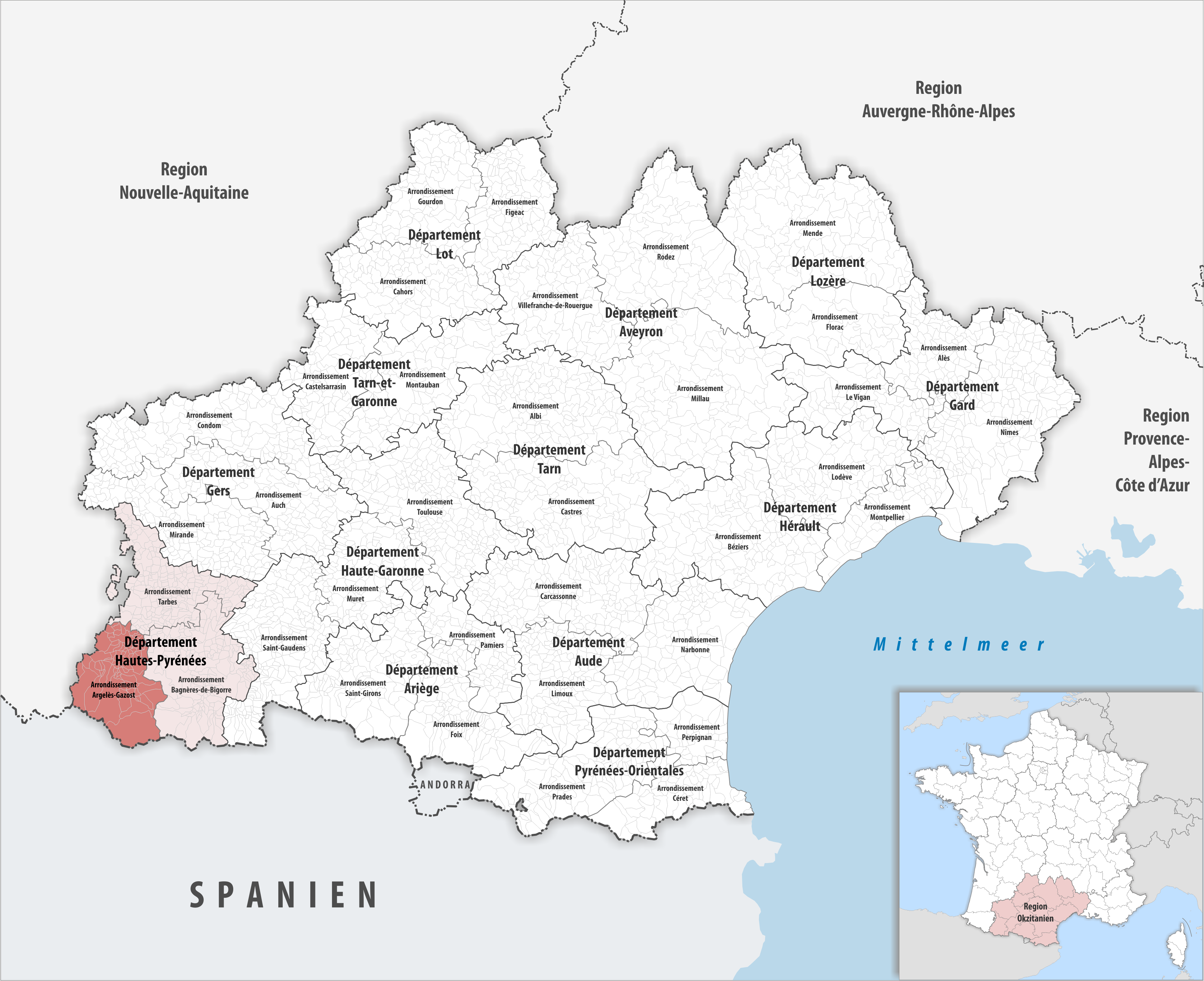
- Location within the region Occitanie
- Country: France
- Region: Occitania
- Department: Hautes-Pyrénées
- No. of communes: {{{nbcomm}}}
- Area: 1,300.2 km^{2} (502.0 sq mi)
- Population (2023): 37,348
  - Density: 28.725/km^{2} (74.397/sq mi)
- INSEE code: 651

The arrondissement of Argelès-Gazost is an arrondissement of France in the Hautes-Pyrénées department in the Occitanie region. It has 87 communes. Its population is 37,801 (2021), and its area is 1,300.2 km^{2} (502.0 sq mi).

== Composition ==
The communes of the arrondissement of Argelès-Gazost, and their INSEE codes, are:

1. Adast (65001)
2. Adé (65002)
3. Agos-Vidalos (65004)
4. Les Angles (65011)
5. Arbéost (65018)
6. Arcizac-ez-Angles (65020)
7. Arcizans-Avant (65021)
8. Arcizans-Dessus (65022)
9. Argelès-Gazost (65025)
10. Arras-en-Lavedan (65029)
11. Arrayou-Lahitte (65247)
12. Arrens-Marsous (65032)
13. Arrodets-ez-Angles (65033)
14. Artalens-Souin (65036)
15. Artigues (65038)
16. Aspin-en-Lavedan (65040)
17. Aucun (65045)
18. Ayros-Arbouix (65055)
19. Ayzac-Ost (65056)
20. Barèges (65481)
21. Barlest (65065)
22. Bartrès (65070)
23. Beaucens (65077)
24. Berbérust-Lias (65082)
25. Betpouey (65089)
26. Boô-Silhen (65098)
27. Bourréac (65107)
28. Bun (65112)
29. Cauterets (65138)
30. Cheust (65144)
31. Chèze (65145)
32. Escoubès-Pouts (65164)
33. Esquièze-Sère (65168)
34. Estaing (65169)
35. Esterre (65173)
36. Ferrières (65176)
37. Gaillagos (65182)
38. Gavarnie-Gèdre (65192)
39. Gazost (65191)
40. Ger (65197)
41. Germs-sur-l'Oussouet (65200)
42. Geu (65201)
43. Gez (65202)
44. Gez-ez-Angles (65203)
45. Grust (65210)
46. Jarret (65233)
47. Julos (65236)
48. Juncalas (65237)
49. Lau-Balagnas (65267)
50. Lézignan (65271)
51. Loubajac (65280)
52. Lourdes (65286)
53. Lugagnan (65291)
54. Luz-Saint-Sauveur (65295)
55. Omex (65334)
56. Ossen (65343)
57. Ossun-ez-Angles (65345)
58. Ourdis-Cotdoussan (65348)
59. Ourdon (65349)
60. Ousté (65351)
61. Ouzous (65352)
62. Paréac (65355)
63. Peyrouse (65360)
64. Pierrefitte-Nestalas (65362)
65. Poueyferré (65366)
66. Préchac (65371)
67. Saint-Créac (65386)
68. Saint-Pastous (65393)
69. Saint-Pé-de-Bigorre (65395)
70. Saint-Savin (65396)
71. Saligos (65399)
72. Salles (65400)
73. Sassis (65411)
74. Sazos (65413)
75. Ségus (65415)
76. Sère-en-Lavedan (65420)
77. Sère-Lanso (65421)
78. Sers (65424)
79. Sireix (65428)
80. Soulom (65435)
81. Uz (65458)
82. Viella (65463)
83. Vier-Bordes (65467)
84. Viey (65469)
85. Viger (65470)
86. Villelongue (65473)
87. Viscos (65478)

== History ==
The arrondissement of Argelès-Gazost was created in 1800, disbanded in 1926 and restored in 1942.

As a result of the reorganisation of the cantons of France which came into effect in 2015, the borders of the cantons are no longer related to the borders of the arrondissements. The cantons of the arrondissement of Argelès-Gazost were, as of January 2015:

1. Argelès-Gazost
2. Aucun
3. Lourdes-Est
4. Lourdes-Ouest
5. Luz-Saint-Sauveur
6. Saint-Pé-de-Bigorre
