= Omex =

- Commune
- Coat of arms
- Location of Omex
- Location within France Location within Occitanie
- Coordinates: 43°04′35″N 0°04′46″W
- Country: France
- Region: Occitania
- Department: Hautes-Pyrénées
- Arrondissement: Argelès-Gazost
- Canton: Lourdes-1
- Intercommunality: CA Tarbes-Lourdes-Pyrénées

Government
  - Mayor (2020–2026): Evelyne Laborde
- Area^{1}: 5.53 km^{2} (2.14 sq mi)
- Elevation: 450 m (1,480 ft)
- Highest elevation: 1,133 m (3,717 ft)
- Lowest elevation: 409 m (1,342 ft)
- Population (2023): 217
  - Density: 39.2/km^{2} (102/sq mi)
- Time zone: UTC+01:00 (CET)
  - Summer (DST): UTC+02:00 (CEST)
- INSEE/Postal code: 65334 /65100
- ^{1} French Land Register data, which excludes lakes, ponds, glaciers > 1 km^{2} (0.386 sq mi or 247 acres) and river estuaries.

Omex (French pronunciation: [ɔmɛks]; Occitan: Aumets) is a commune in the Hautes-Pyrénées department in south-western France.

== See also ==
- Communes of the Hautes-Pyrénées department
