= Saint-Créac, Hautes-Pyrénées =

Saint-Créac
- Commune
- Coat of arms
- Location of Saint-Créac
- Location within France Location within Occitanie
- Coordinates: 43°03′36″N 0°01′27″W
- Country: France
- Region: Occitania
- Department: Hautes-Pyrénées
- Arrondissement: Argelès-Gazost
- Canton: Lourdes-2
- Intercommunality: CA Tarbes-Lourdes-Pyrénées

Government
  - Mayor (2020–2026): Gilbert Graveleine
- Area^{1}: 2.2 km^{2} (0.85 sq mi)
- Elevation: 422 m (1,385 ft)
- Highest elevation: 825 m (2,707 ft)
- Lowest elevation: 416 m (1,365 ft)
- Population (2023): 99
  - Density: 45/km^{2} (120/sq mi)
- Time zone: UTC+01:00 (CET)
  - Summer (DST): UTC+02:00 (CEST)
- INSEE/Postal code: 65386 /65100
- ^{1} French Land Register data, which excludes lakes, ponds, glaciers > 1 km^{2} (0.386 sq mi or 247 acres) and river estuaries.

Saint-Créac (French pronunciation: [sɛ̃ kʁeak]; Occitan: Sent Criac) is a commune in the Hautes-Pyrénées department in south-western France.

== See also ==
- Communes of the Hautes-Pyrénées department
