= Ossun-ez-Angles =

- Commune
- Coat of arms
- Location of Ossun-ez-Angles
- Location within France Location within Occitanie
- Coordinates: 43°04′46″N 0°03′23″E
- Country: France
- Region: Occitania
- Department: Hautes-Pyrénées
- Arrondissement: Argelès-Gazost
- Canton: Lourdes-2
- Intercommunality: CA Tarbes-Lourdes-Pyrénées

Government
  - Mayor (2020–2026): Jean-Marc Duclos
- Area^{1}: 2.14 km^{2} (0.83 sq mi)
- Elevation: 600 m (2,000 ft)
- Highest elevation: 826 m (2,710 ft)
- Lowest elevation: 431 m (1,414 ft)
- Population (2023): 57
  - Density: 27/km^{2} (69/sq mi)
- Time zone: UTC+01:00 (CET)
  - Summer (DST): UTC+02:00 (CEST)
- INSEE/Postal code: 65345 /65100
- ^{1} French Land Register data, which excludes lakes, ponds, glaciers > 1 km^{2} (0.386 sq mi or 247 acres) and river estuaries.

Ossun-ez-Angles is a commune in the Hautes-Pyrénées department in south-western France.

== See also ==
- Communes of the Hautes-Pyrénées department

== Notable people ==
Dominique Domec (1845-1884) was a French surgeon and professor of anatomy born in Ossun-ez-Angles and died in Quito (Ecuador) on 11 October 1884. He helped to establish the Ecuadorian medical school of surgery in the second half of the 19th century.
