= Arrodets-ez-Angles =

- Commune
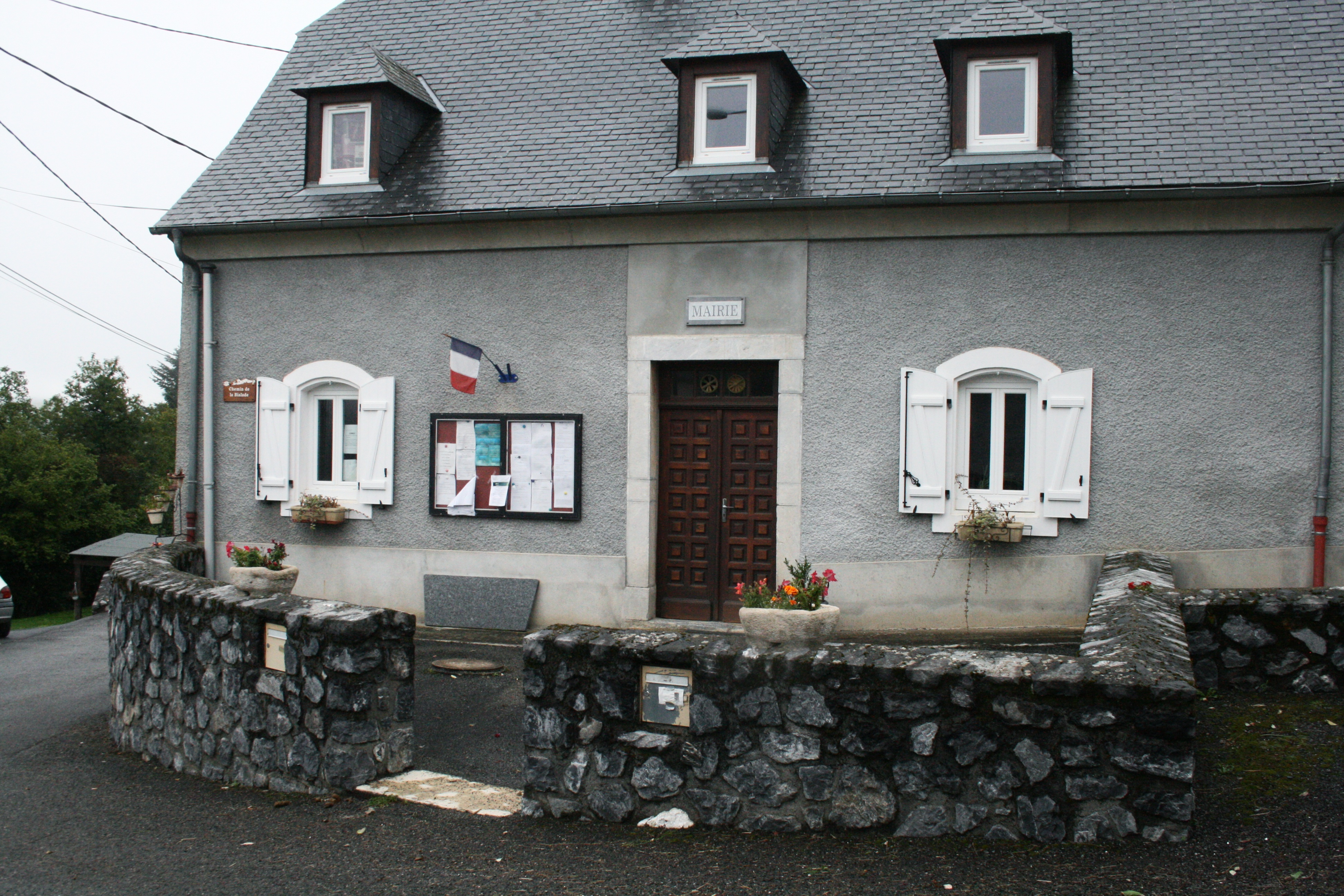
- Town hall

- Coat of arms
- Location of Arrodets-ez-Angles
- Location within France Location within Occitanie
- Coordinates: 43°04′30″N 0°02′21″E
- Country: France
- Region: Occitania
- Department: Hautes-Pyrénées
- Arrondissement: Argelès-Gazost
- Canton: Lourdes-2
- Intercommunality: CA Tarbes-Lourdes-Pyrénées

Government
  - Mayor (2020–2026): Agnès Labarthe
- Area^{1}: 4.79 km^{2} (1.85 sq mi)
- Elevation: 750 m (2,460 ft)
- Highest elevation: 931 m (3,054 ft)
- Lowest elevation: 434 m (1,424 ft)
- Population (2023): 113
  - Density: 23.6/km^{2} (61.1/sq mi)
- Time zone: UTC+01:00 (CET)
  - Summer (DST): UTC+02:00 (CEST)
- INSEE/Postal code: 65033 /65100
- ^{1} French Land Register data, which excludes lakes, ponds, glaciers > 1 km^{2} (0.386 sq mi or 247 acres) and river estuaries.

Arrodets-ez-Angles (before 1962: Arrodets) is a commune in the Hautes-Pyrénées department in southwestern France.

== Population ==
Historical population
Year	Pop.	±% p.a.
1968	94	—
1975	63	−5.56%
1982	56	−1.67%
1990	62	+1.28%
1999	81	+3.01%
2007	114	+4.36%
2012	108	−1.08%
2017	110	+0.37%
2023	113	+0.45%
Source: INSEE

== See also ==
- Communes of the Hautes-Pyrénées department
