= Arrayou-Lahitte =

- Commune
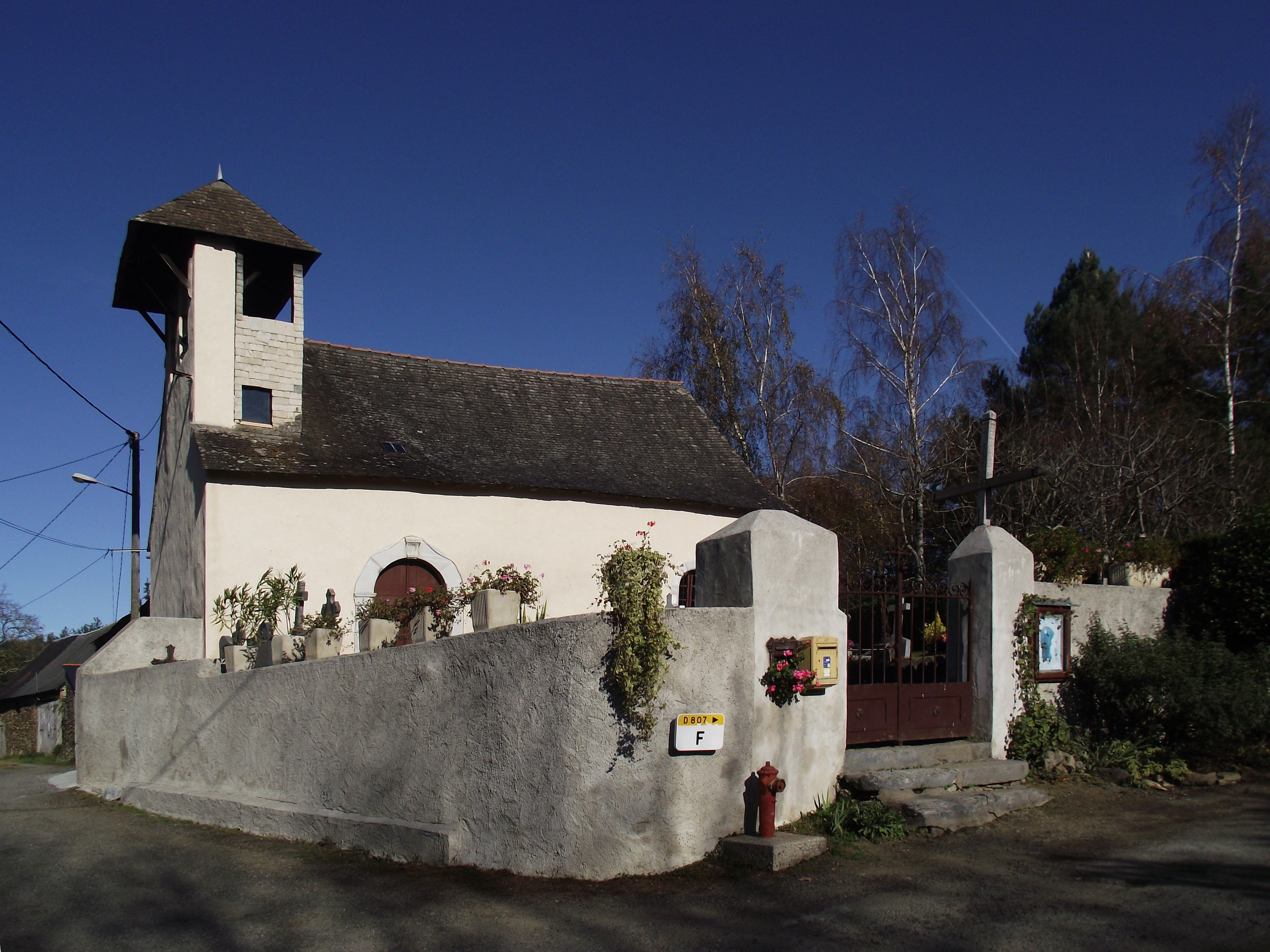
- The church of Saint-Martin
- Location of Arrayou-Lahitte
- Location within France Location within Occitanie
- Coordinates: 43°05′35″N 0°02′29″E
- Country: France
- Region: Occitania
- Department: Hautes-Pyrénées
- Arrondissement: Argelès-Gazost
- Canton: Lourdes-2
- Intercommunality: CA Tarbes-Lourdes-Pyrénées

Government
  - Mayor (2020–2026): Valérie Lanne
- Area^{1}: 4.81 km^{2} (1.86 sq mi)
- Elevation: 396 m (1,299 ft)
- Highest elevation: 699 m (2,293 ft)
- Lowest elevation: 393 m (1,289 ft)
- Population (2023): 99
  - Density: 21/km^{2} (53/sq mi)
- Time zone: UTC+01:00 (CET)
  - Summer (DST): UTC+02:00 (CEST)
- INSEE/Postal code: 65247 /65100
- ^{1} French Land Register data, which excludes lakes, ponds, glaciers > 1 km^{2} (0.386 sq mi or 247 acres) and river estuaries.

Arrayou-Lahitte (French pronunciation: [aʁaju la.it]; Occitan: Arrajon era Hita) is a commune in the Hautes-Pyrénées department in southwestern France. The commune was formed in 1965 by the merger of the former communes Arrayou and Lahitte-ez-Angles.

== Population ==
Historical population
Year	Pop.	±% p.a.
1968	98	—
1975	84	−2.18%
1982	87	+0.50%
1990	83	−0.59%
1999	93	+1.27%
2007	100	+0.91%
2012	105	+0.98%
2017	107	+0.38%
2023	99	−1.29%
Source: INSEE

== See also ==
- Communes of the Hautes-Pyrénées department
