= Communauté d'agglomération Tarbes-Lourdes-Pyrénées =

Tarbes-Lourdes-Pyrénées
- Communauté d'agglomération
- Interactive map of Tarbes-Lourdes-Pyrénées
- Country: France
- Region: Occitania
- Department: Hautes-Pyrénées
- No. of communes: {{{nbcomm}}}
- Established: 2017
- Area: 614.8 km^{2} (237.4 sq mi)
- Population (2017): 123,588
  - Density: 201.0/km^{2} (520.6/sq mi)
- Website: www.agglo-tlp.fr

The Communauté d'agglomération Tarbes-Lourdes-Pyrénées is an intercommunal structure in the Hautes-Pyrénées department, in the Occitanie region of southern France. It was created in January 2017. Its seat is in Juillan. Its area is 614.8 km^{2}. Its population was 123,588 in 2017, of which 41,518 in Tarbes proper.

== Composition ==
The communauté d'agglomération consists of the following 86 communes:

1. Adé
2. Allier
3. Les Angles
4. Angos
5. Arcizac-Adour
6. Arcizac-ez-Angles
7. Arrayou-Lahitte
8. Arrodets-ez-Angles
9. Artigues
10. Aspin-en-Lavedan
11. Aureilhan
12. Aurensan
13. Averan
14. Azereix
15. Barbazan-Debat
16. Barlest
17. Barry
18. Bartrès
19. Bazet
20. Bénac
21. Berbérust-Lias
22. Bernac-Debat
23. Bernac-Dessus
24. Bordères-sur-l'Échez
25. Bourréac
26. Bours
27. Cheust
28. Chis
29. Escoubès-Pouts
30. Gardères
31. Gayan
32. Gazost
33. Ger
34. Germs-sur-l'Oussouet
35. Geu
36. Gez-ez-Angles
37. Hibarette
38. Horgues
39. Ibos
40. Jarret
41. Juillan
42. Julos
43. Juncalas
44. Lagarde
45. Laloubère
46. Lamarque-Pontacq
47. Lanne
48. Layrisse
49. Lézignan
50. Loubajac
51. Loucrup
52. Louey
53. Lourdes
54. Lugagnan
55. Luquet
56. Momères
57. Montignac
58. Odos
59. Omex
60. Orincles
61. Orleix
62. Ossen
63. Ossun
64. Ossun-ez-Angles
65. Ourdis-Cotdoussan
66. Ourdon
67. Oursbelille
68. Ousté
69. Paréac
70. Peyrouse
71. Poueyferré
72. Saint-Créac
73. Saint-Martin
74. Saint-Pé-de-Bigorre
75. Salles-Adour
76. Sarniguet
77. Sarrouilles
78. Ségus
79. Séméac
80. Sère-Lanso
81. Séron
82. Soues
83. Tarbes
84. Vielle-Adour
85. Viger
86. Visker
