= Poueyferré =

- Commune
- Coat of arms
- Location of Poueyferré
- Location within France Location within Occitanie
- Coordinates: 43°07′15″N 0°04′36″W
- Country: France
- Region: Occitania
- Department: Hautes-Pyrénées
- Arrondissement: Argelès-Gazost
- Canton: Lourdes-1
- Intercommunality: CA Tarbes-Lourdes-Pyrénées

Government
  - Mayor (2020–2026): Jean-Louis Cazaubon
- Area^{1}: 6.2 km^{2} (2.4 sq mi)
- Elevation: 450 m (1,480 ft)
- Highest elevation: 560 m (1,840 ft)
- Lowest elevation: 407 m (1,335 ft)
- Population (2023): 827
  - Density: 130/km^{2} (350/sq mi)
- Time zone: UTC+01:00 (CET)
  - Summer (DST): UTC+02:00 (CEST)
- INSEE/Postal code: 65366 /65100
- ^{1} French Land Register data, which excludes lakes, ponds, glaciers > 1 km^{2} (0.386 sq mi or 247 acres) and river estuaries.

Poueyferré (French pronunciation: [pwɛfɛʁe]; Occitan: Poiharrèr) is a commune in the Hautes-Pyrénées department in south-western France. It is located about thirteen kilometres north of Argelès-Gazost. As of 2023, the population of the commune was 827.

== See also ==
- Communes of the Hautes-Pyrénées department
