= Escoubès-Pouts =

- Commune
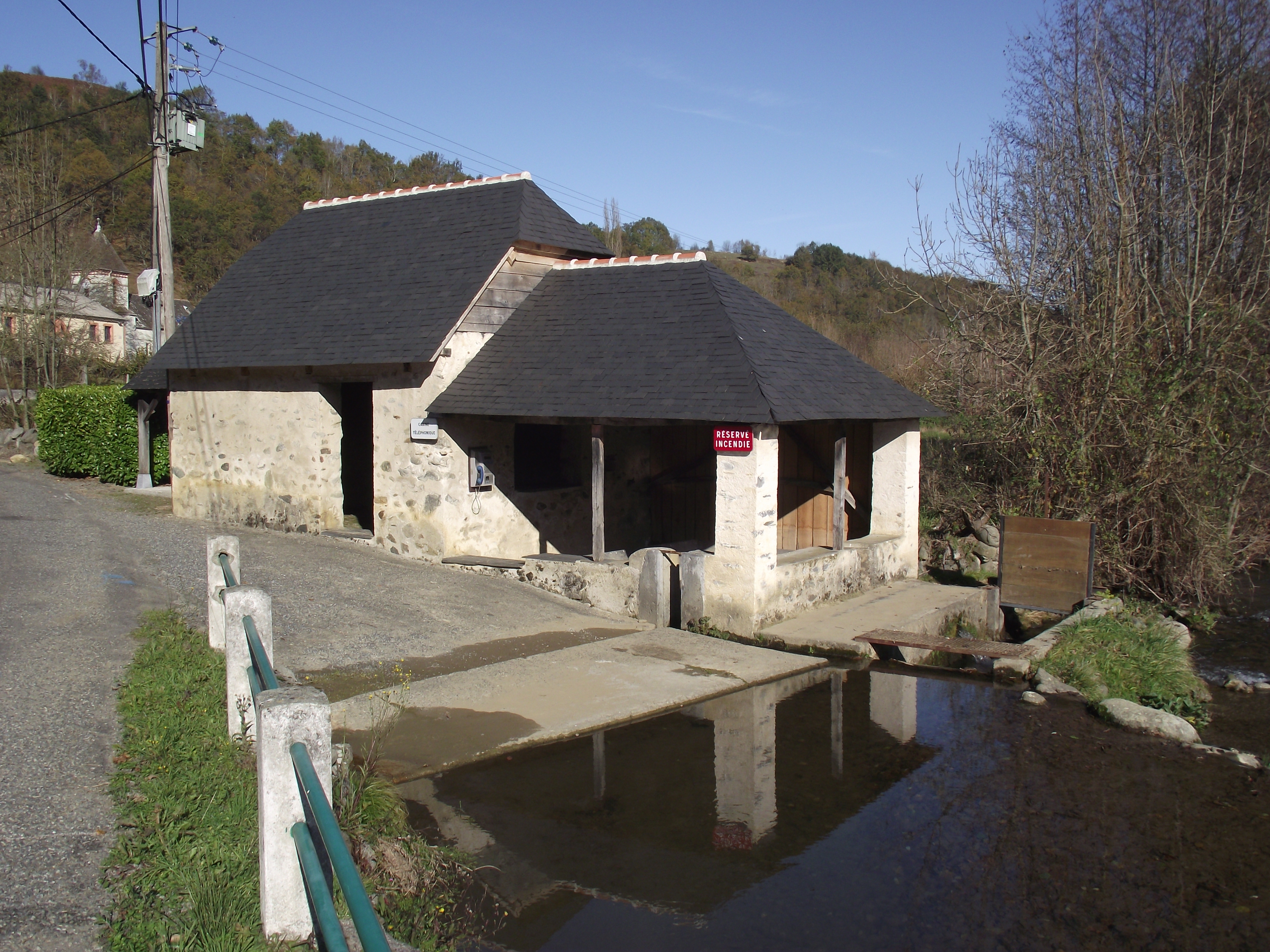
- The lavoir of Escoubès

- Coat of arms
- Location of Escoubès-Pouts
- Location within France Location within Occitanie
- Coordinates: 43°06′25″N 0°01′56″E
- Country: France
- Region: Occitania
- Department: Hautes-Pyrénées
- Arrondissement: Argelès-Gazost
- Canton: Lourdes-2
- Intercommunality: CA Tarbes-Lourdes-Pyrénées

Government
  - Mayor (2020–2026): Yves Cardeilhac
- Area^{1}: 2.77 km^{2} (1.07 sq mi)
- Elevation: 225 m (738 ft)
- Highest elevation: 552 m (1,811 ft)
- Lowest elevation: 373 m (1,224 ft)
- Population (2023): 91
  - Density: 33/km^{2} (85/sq mi)
- Time zone: UTC+01:00 (CET)
  - Summer (DST): UTC+02:00 (CEST)
- INSEE/Postal code: 65164 /65100
- ^{1} French Land Register data, which excludes lakes, ponds, glaciers > 1 km^{2} (0.386 sq mi or 247 acres) and river estuaries.

Escoubès-Pouts is a commune in the Hautes-Pyrénées department in south-western France.

== See also ==
- Communes of the Hautes-Pyrénées department
