= Juncalas =

- Commune
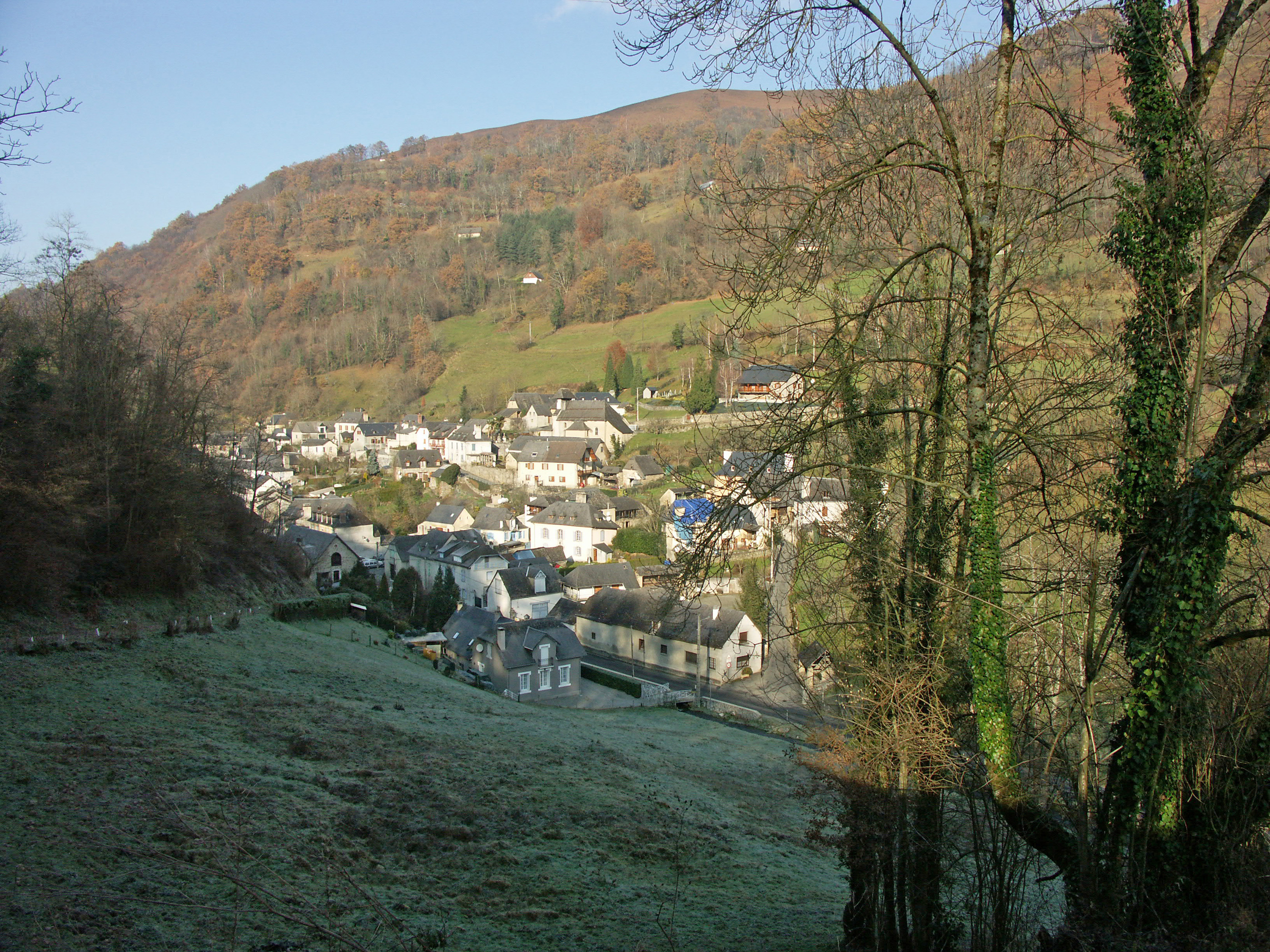
- A general view

- Coat of arms
- Location of Juncalas
- Location within France Location within Occitanie
- Coordinates: 43°03′17″N 0°00′05″E
- Country: France
- Region: Occitania
- Department: Hautes-Pyrénées
- Arrondissement: Argelès-Gazost
- Canton: Lourdes-2
- Intercommunality: CA Tarbes-Lourdes-Pyrénées

Government
  - Mayor (2020–2026): Benoît Dossat
- Area^{1}: 3.51 km^{2} (1.36 sq mi)
- Elevation: 481 m (1,578 ft)
- Highest elevation: 880 m (2,890 ft)
- Lowest elevation: 460 m (1,510 ft)
- Population (2023): 174
  - Density: 49.6/km^{2} (128/sq mi)
- Time zone: UTC+01:00 (CET)
  - Summer (DST): UTC+02:00 (CEST)
- INSEE/Postal code: 65237 /65100
- ^{1} French Land Register data, which excludes lakes, ponds, glaciers > 1 km^{2} (0.386 sq mi or 247 acres) and river estuaries.

Juncalas (French pronunciation: [ʒœ̃kalas]; Occitan: Juncalàs) is a commune in the Hautes-Pyrénées department in south-western France.

== See also ==
- Communes of the Hautes-Pyrénées department
