= Lugagnan =

- Commune
- Coat of arms
- Location of Lugagnan
- Location within France Location within Occitanie
- Coordinates: 43°03′46″N 0°02′13″W
- Country: France
- Region: Occitania
- Department: Hautes-Pyrénées
- Arrondissement: Argelès-Gazost
- Canton: Lourdes-2
- Intercommunality: CA Tarbes-Lourdes-Pyrénées

Government
  - Mayor (2020–2026): Jacques Garrot
- Area^{1}: 0.7 km^{2} (0.27 sq mi)
- Elevation: 391 m (1,283 ft)
- Highest elevation: 575 m (1,886 ft)
- Lowest elevation: 380 m (1,250 ft)
- Population (2023): 167
  - Density: 240/km^{2} (620/sq mi)
- Time zone: UTC+01:00 (CET)
  - Summer (DST): UTC+02:00 (CEST)
- INSEE/Postal code: 65291 /65100
- ^{1} French Land Register data, which excludes lakes, ponds, glaciers > 1 km^{2} (0.386 sq mi or 247 acres) and river estuaries.

Lugagnan (French pronunciation: [lyɡaɲɑ̃]; Occitan: Luganhan) is a commune in the Hautes-Pyrénées department in south-western France.

== See also ==
- Communes of the Hautes-Pyrénées department
