= Berbérust-Lias =

- Commune
- Coat of arms
- Location of Berbérust-Lias
- Location within France Location within Occitanie
- Coordinates: 43°02′48″N 0°01′43″W
- Country: France
- Region: Occitania
- Department: Hautes-Pyrénées
- Arrondissement: Argelès-Gazost
- Canton: Lourdes-2
- Intercommunality: CA Tarbes-Lourdes-Pyrénées

Government
  - Mayor (2020–2026): Fabrice Subercazes
- Area^{1}: 5.73 km^{2} (2.21 sq mi)
- Elevation: 733 m (2,405 ft)
- Highest elevation: 1,504 m (4,934 ft)
- Lowest elevation: 520 m (1,710 ft)
- Population (2023): 44
  - Density: 7.7/km^{2} (20/sq mi)
- Time zone: UTC+01:00 (CET)
  - Summer (DST): UTC+02:00 (CEST)
- INSEE/Postal code: 65082 /65100
- ^{1} French Land Register data, which excludes lakes, ponds, glaciers > 1 km^{2} (0.386 sq mi or 247 acres) and river estuaries.

Berbérust-Lias (French pronunciation: [bɛʁbeʁyst ljas]; Occitan: Berberust e Liàs) is a commune in the Hautes-Pyrénées department in southwestern France.

== Population ==
Historical population
Year	Pop.	±% p.a.
1968	69	—
1975	58	−2.45%
1982	54	−1.02%
1990	48	−1.46%
1999	40	−2.01%
2007	51	+3.08%
2012	57	+2.25%
2017	50	−2.59%
2023	44	−2.11%
Source: INSEE

== See also ==
- Communes of the Hautes-Pyrénées department
