= Julos =

- Commune
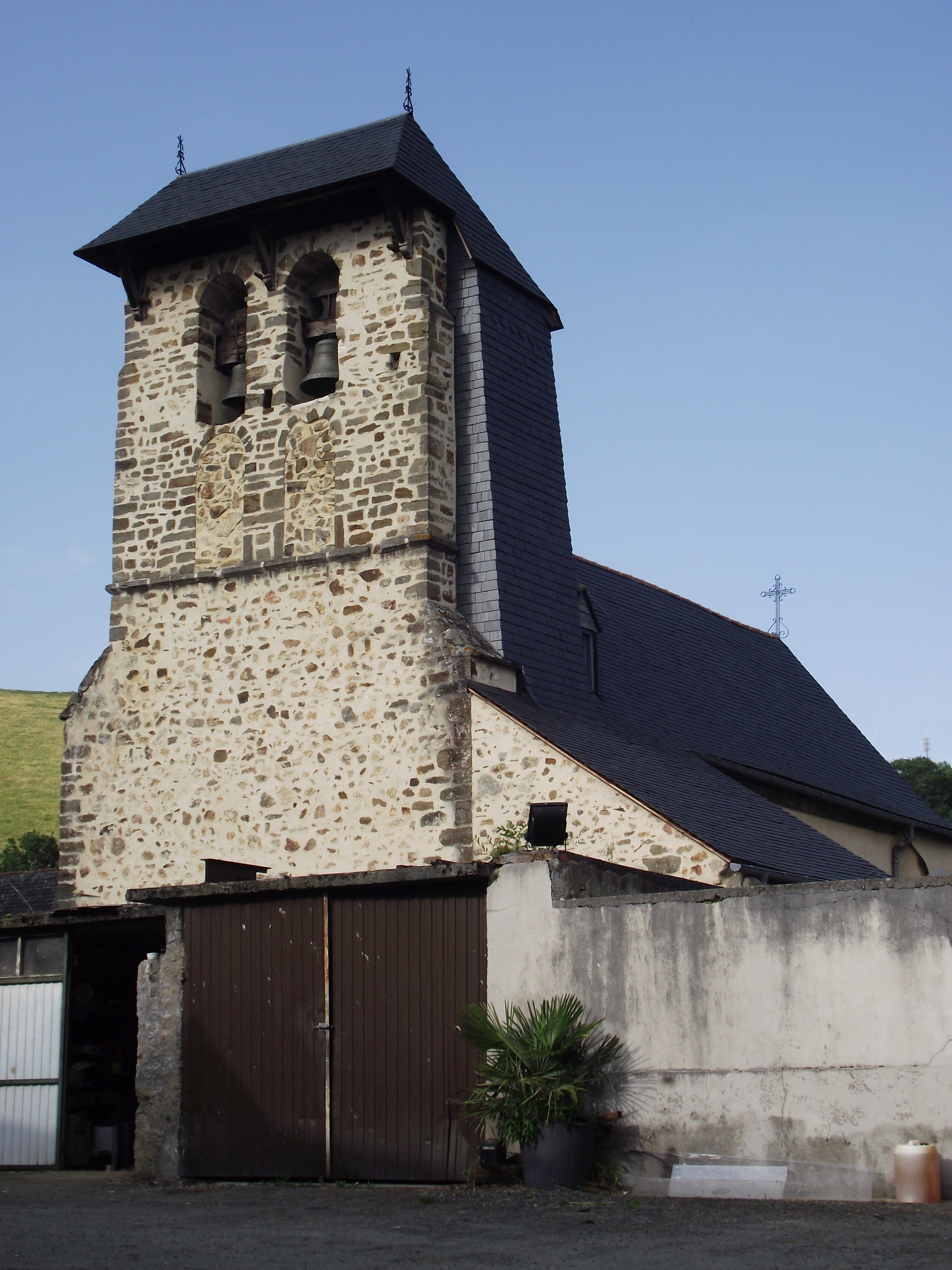
- The church of Saint-Pierre

- Coat of arms
- Location of Julos
- Location within France Location within Occitanie
- Coordinates: 43°07′21″N 0°00′22″E
- Country: France
- Region: Occitania
- Department: Hautes-Pyrénées
- Arrondissement: Argelès-Gazost
- Canton: Lourdes-2
- Intercommunality: CA Tarbes-Lourdes-Pyrénées

Government
  - Mayor (2020–2026): Eric Abbadie
- Area^{1}: 5.86 km^{2} (2.26 sq mi)
- Elevation: 550 m (1,800 ft)
- Highest elevation: 648 m (2,126 ft)
- Lowest elevation: 398 m (1,306 ft)
- Population (2023): 450
  - Density: 77/km^{2} (200/sq mi)
- Time zone: UTC+01:00 (CET)
  - Summer (DST): UTC+02:00 (CEST)
- INSEE/Postal code: 65236 /65100
- ^{1} French Land Register data, which excludes lakes, ponds, glaciers > 1 km^{2} (0.386 sq mi or 247 acres) and river estuaries.

Julos (French pronunciation: [ʒylɔs]; Occitan: Julòs) is a commune in the Hautes-Pyrénées department in south-western France.

== See also ==
- Communes of the Hautes-Pyrénées department
