= Loubajac =

- Commune
- Coat of arms
- Location of Loubajac
- Location within France Location within Occitanie
- Coordinates: 43°08′05″N 0°04′48″W
- Country: France
- Region: Occitania
- Department: Hautes-Pyrénées
- Arrondissement: Argelès-Gazost
- Canton: Lourdes-1
- Intercommunality: CA Tarbes-Lourdes-Pyrénées

Government
  - Mayor (2020–2026): Guy Vergès
- Area^{1}: 6.55 km^{2} (2.53 sq mi)
- Elevation: 420 m (1,380 ft)
- Highest elevation: 534 m (1,752 ft)
- Lowest elevation: 398 m (1,306 ft)
- Population (2023): 445
  - Density: 67.9/km^{2} (176/sq mi)
- Time zone: UTC+01:00 (CET)
  - Summer (DST): UTC+02:00 (CEST)
- INSEE/Postal code: 65280 /65100
- ^{1} French Land Register data, which excludes lakes, ponds, glaciers > 1 km^{2} (0.386 sq mi or 247 acres) and river estuaries.

Loubajac (French pronunciation: [lubaʒak]; Occitan: Lobajac) is a commune in the Hautes-Pyrénées department in south-western France.

== See also ==
- Communes of the Hautes-Pyrénées department
