= Bourréac =

- Commune
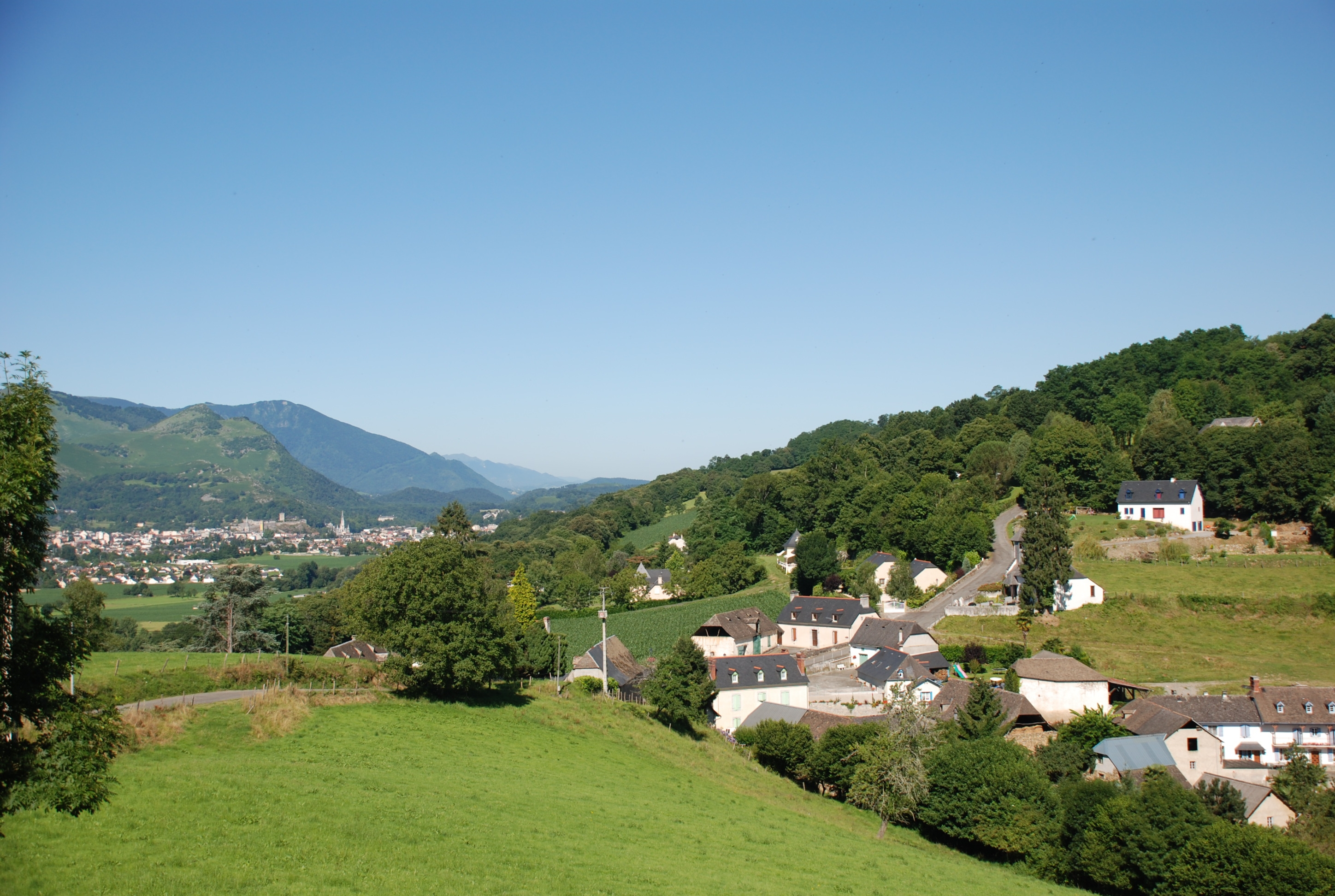
- Bourréac looking toward Lourdes
- Location of Bourréac
- Location within France Location within Occitanie
- Coordinates: 43°06′14″N 0°00′09″E
- Country: France
- Region: Occitania
- Department: Hautes-Pyrénées
- Arrondissement: Argelès-Gazost
- Canton: Lourdes-2
- Intercommunality: CA Tarbes-Lourdes-Pyrénées

Government
  - Mayor (2023–2026): Hervé Palisse
- Area^{1}: 1.26 km^{2} (0.49 sq mi)
- Elevation: 520 m (1,710 ft)
- Highest elevation: 582 m (1,909 ft)
- Lowest elevation: 429 m (1,407 ft)
- Population (2023): 117
  - Density: 92.9/km^{2} (240/sq mi)
- Time zone: UTC+01:00 (CET)
  - Summer (DST): UTC+02:00 (CEST)
- INSEE/Postal code: 65107 /65100
- ^{1} French Land Register data, which excludes lakes, ponds, glaciers > 1 km^{2} (0.386 sq mi or 247 acres) and river estuaries.

Bourréac (French pronunciation: [buʁeak]; Occitan: Borriac) is a commune in the Hautes-Pyrénées department in southwestern France near the city of Lourdes (4,5 km).

Its economy is based on residences (the village is included in the urban area of Lourdes), agriculture (animal husbandry mainly) and tourism (gîtes ruraux).

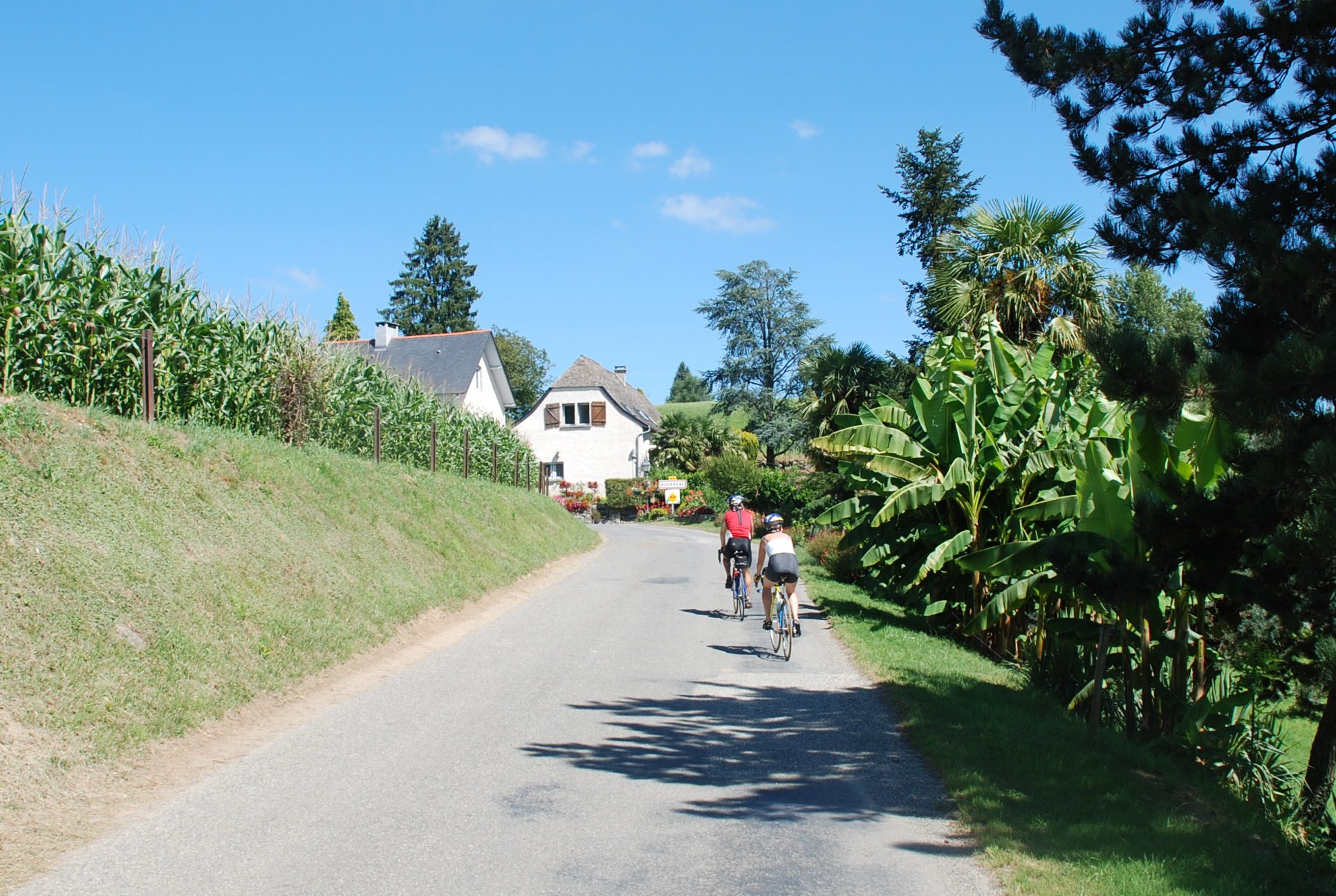
Entry of Bourréac coming from Lourdes

== Geography ==
The village overlooks Lezignan and Lourdes valley as from a balcony and stays in the center of a line of low hills, 500 to 600 m high, in front of the chain of Pyrenees Mountains, with notably the foreground Pic du Jer (950m), and, in the middle distance, the summits of Cabaliros (2334 m), Hautacam (1500 to 1800 m), Montaigu (2339 m) and Pic du Midi de Bigorre (2877 m).
Crest paths starts from the village, mainly the D807 in the direction of Recahorts (hamlet of Bourréac) and, then, Pouts (hamlet of a neighbour village, Escoubes-Pouts).

== Population ==
Historical population
Year	Pop.	±% p.a.
1968	41	—
1975	45	+1.34%
1982	49	+1.22%
1990	46	−0.79%
1999	70	+4.78%
2007	92	+3.48%
2012	85	−1.57%
2017	108	+4.91%
2023	117	+1.34%
Source: INSEE

== Climate ==
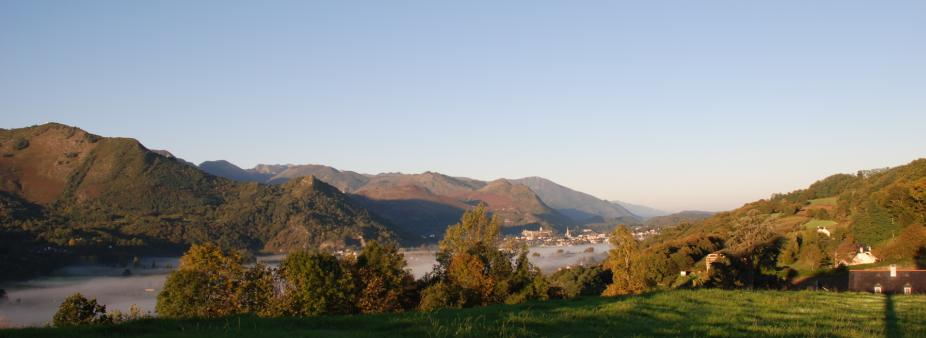
Sunrise on Bourréac, 2007, October 14. Mist on Lézignan and Lourdes plain

The climate of Bourréac is that one mentioned by the meteo station of Ossun-Tarbes with a microclimate for special places resulting from their exposition to south and a protection from west wind. So in winter, local temperature is often 2 or 3 degrees higher than that noted in the valley of Lezignan and Lourdes.

== History ==
=== Etymology ===
As many French words whose suffix is ac (from Latin acum ), Bourréac name comes from the name of an antique Gallo-Roman property, with the patronymic Burrius or Burrinus : the property of Burrius. On the neighbour place of Sendac, a marble Gallo-Roman statue has been discovered in 1846. It can be seen in the Jardin Massey Museum, in Tarbes.

=== Administration ===
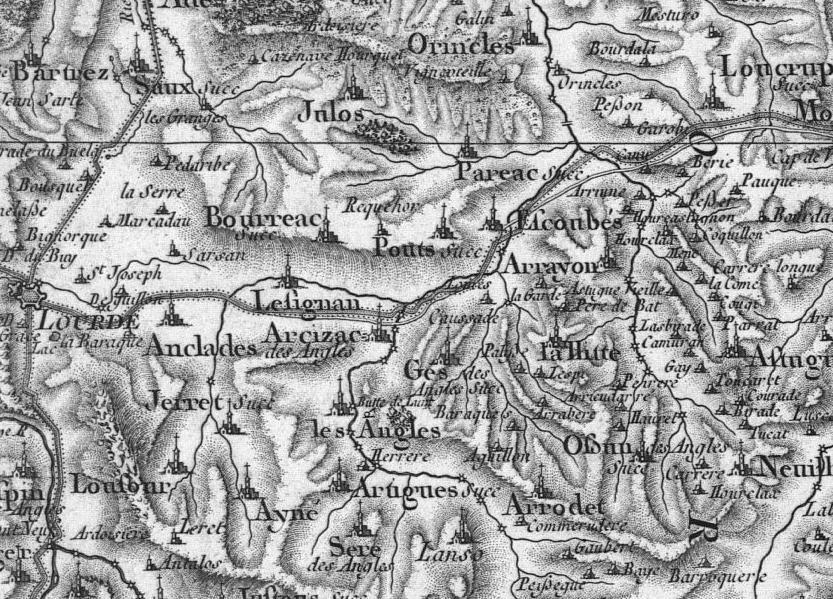
Part of the Cassini map showing the names of communes, parishes or succursales (succ) of parish as Bourréac, and their hamlets, 1780-1810

Before 1789, during the old or Ancien Régime, Bourréac was included in the Barony of The Angles (name of a neighbouring village with a mediaeval castle).

== See also ==
- Communes of the Hautes-Pyrénées department
