= Gez-ez-Angles =

- Commune
- Coat of arms
- Location of Gez-ez-Angles
- Location within France Location within Occitanie
- Coordinates: 43°05′29″N 0°01′29″E
- Country: France
- Region: Occitania
- Department: Hautes-Pyrénées
- Arrondissement: Argelès-Gazost
- Canton: Lourdes-2
- Intercommunality: CA Tarbes-Lourdes-Pyrénées
- Area^{1}: 2.37 km^{2} (0.92 sq mi)
- Elevation: 549 m (1,801 ft)
- Highest elevation: 721 m (2,365 ft)
- Lowest elevation: 397 m (1,302 ft)
- Population (2023): 22
  - Density: 9.3/km^{2} (24/sq mi)
- Time zone: UTC+01:00 (CET)
  - Summer (DST): UTC+02:00 (CEST)
- INSEE/Postal code: 65203 /65100
- ^{1} French Land Register data, which excludes lakes, ponds, glaciers > 1 km^{2} (0.386 sq mi or 247 acres) and river estuaries.

Gez-ez-Angles is a commune in the Hautes-Pyrénées department in south-western France.

== See also ==
- Communes of the Hautes-Pyrénées department
