= Canton of Lourdes-2 =

Coordinates: 43.09°N 0.04°W

The canton of Lourdes-2 is an administrative division of the Hautes-Pyrénées department, southwestern France. It was created at the French canton reorganisation which came into effect in March 2015. Its seat is in Lourdes.

It consists of the following communes:

1. Adé
2. Les Angles
3. Arrayou-Lahitte
4. Arcizac-ez-Angles
5. Arrodets-ez-Angles
6. Artigues
7. Berbérust-Lias
8. Bourréac
9. Cheust
10. Escoubès-Pouts
11. Gazost
12. Ger
13. Germs-sur-l'Oussouet
14. Geu
15. Gez-ez-Angles
16. Jarret
17. Julos
18. Juncalas
19. Lézignan
20. Lourdes (partly)
21. Lugagnan
22. Ossun-ez-Angles
23. Ourdis-Cotdoussan
24. Ourdon
25. Ousté
26. Paréac
27. Saint-Créac
28. Sère-Lanso
