= Les Angles, Hautes-Pyrénées =

Les Angles
- Commune
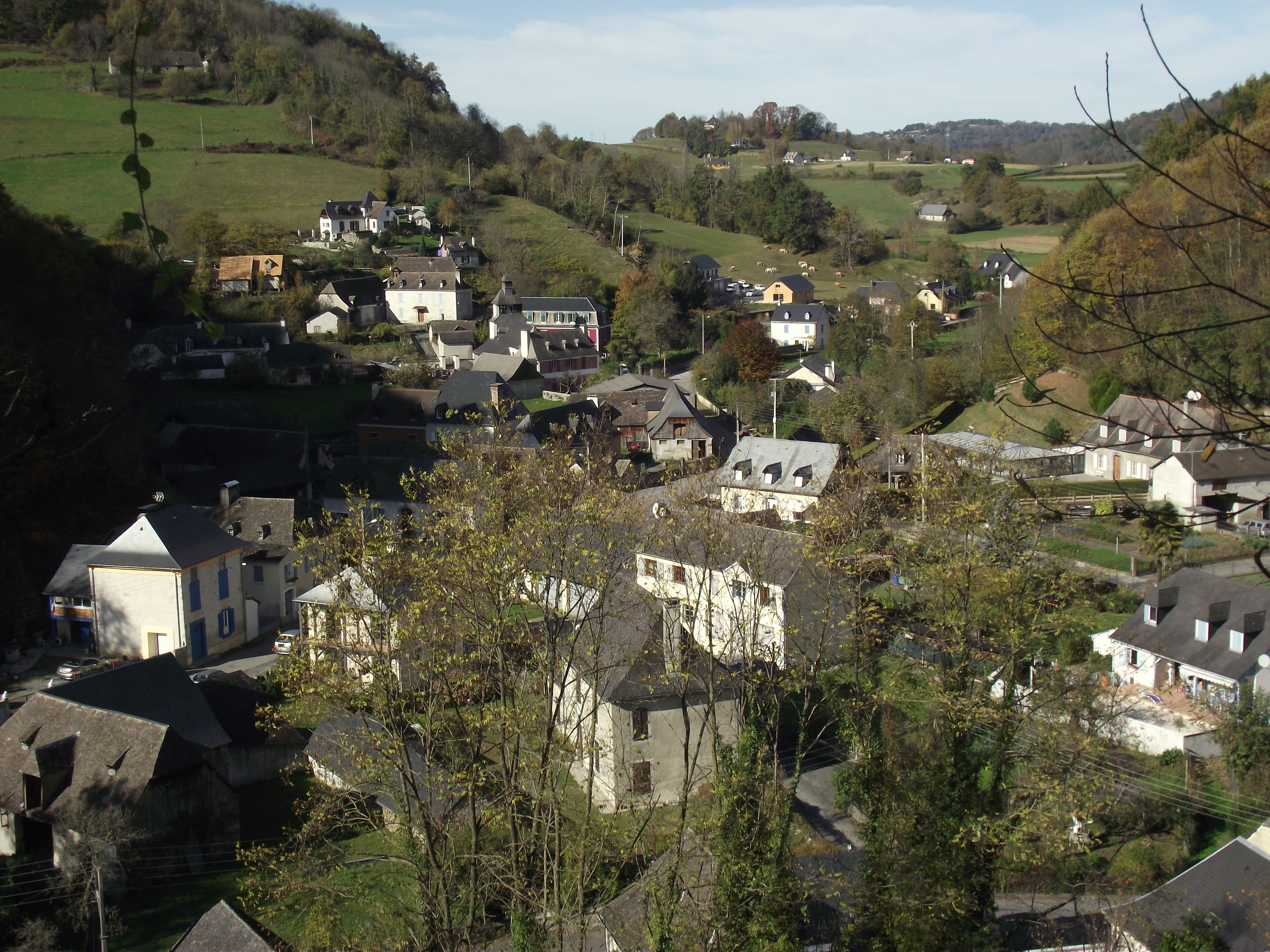
- A general view of the village

- Coat of arms
- Location of Les Angles
- Location within France Location within Occitanie
- Coordinates: 43°05′01″N 0°00′27″E
- Country: France
- Region: Occitania
- Department: Hautes-Pyrénées
- Arrondissement: Argelès-Gazost
- Canton: Lourdes-2
- Intercommunality: CA Tarbes-Lourdes-Pyrénées

Government
  - Mayor (2020–2026): Yvette Lacaze
- Area^{1}: 3.1 km^{2} (1.2 sq mi)
- Elevation: 400 m (1,300 ft)
- Highest elevation: 647 m (2,123 ft)
- Lowest elevation: 407 m (1,335 ft)
- Population (2023): 132
  - Density: 43/km^{2} (110/sq mi)
- Time zone: UTC+01:00 (CET)
  - Summer (DST): UTC+02:00 (CEST)
- INSEE/Postal code: 65011 /65100
- ^{1} French Land Register data, which excludes lakes, ponds, glaciers > 1 km^{2} (0.386 sq mi or 247 acres) and river estuaries.

Les Angles (French pronunciation: [le.z‿ɑ̃ɡl]; Occitan: Eths Angles) is a commune in the Hautes-Pyrénées department in southwestern France.

== Population ==
Historical population
Year	Pop.	±% p.a.
1968	151	—
1975	130	−2.12%
1982	134	+0.43%
1990	145	+0.99%
1999	141	−0.31%
2007	128	−1.20%
2012	124	−0.63%
2017	126	+0.32%
2023	132	+0.78%
Source: INSEE

== See also ==
- Communes of the Hautes-Pyrénées department
