= Gazost =

- Commune
- Coat of arms
- Location of Gazost
- Location within France Location within Occitanie
- Coordinates: 43°02′N 0°01′E
- Country: France
- Region: Occitania
- Department: Hautes-Pyrénées
- Arrondissement: Argelès-Gazost
- Canton: Lourdes-2
- Intercommunality: CA Tarbes-Lourdes-Pyrénées

Government
  - Mayor (2020–2026): Pierre Darré
- Area^{1}: 40.6 km^{2} (15.7 sq mi)
- Elevation: 762 m (2,500 ft)
- Highest elevation: 2,350 m (7,710 ft)
- Lowest elevation: 545 m (1,788 ft)
- Population (2023): 132
  - Density: 3.25/km^{2} (8.42/sq mi)
- Time zone: UTC+01:00 (CET)
  - Summer (DST): UTC+02:00 (CEST)
- INSEE/Postal code: 65191 /65100
- ^{1} French Land Register data, which excludes lakes, ponds, glaciers > 1 km^{2} (0.386 sq mi or 247 acres) and river estuaries.

Gazost (French pronunciation: [ɡazɔst]; Occitan: Gasòst, [ɡaˈzɔst]) is a commune in the French department of Hautes-Pyrénées, Occitania, southwestern France.

== See also ==
- Communes of the Hautes-Pyrénées department
