= Lézignan, Hautes-Pyrénées =

Lézignan
- Commune
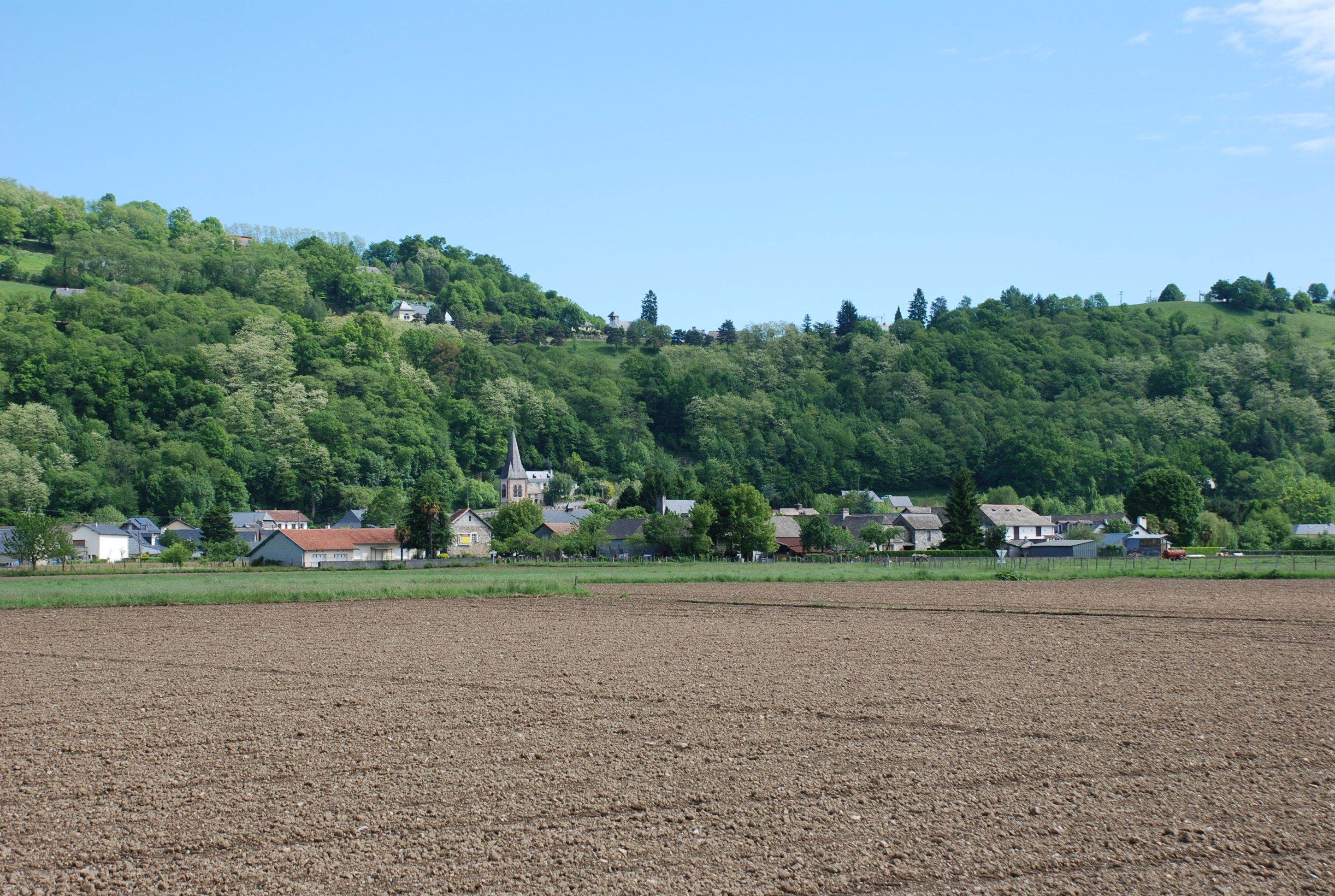
- A general view of Lézignan

- Coat of arms
- Location of Lézignan
- Location within France Location within Occitanie
- Coordinates: 43°05′59″N 0°00′11″W
- Country: France
- Region: Occitania
- Department: Hautes-Pyrénées
- Arrondissement: Argelès-Gazost
- Canton: Lourdes-2
- Intercommunality: CA Tarbes-Lourdes-Pyrénées

Government
  - Mayor (2020–2026): Gérard Boué
- Area^{1}: 2.56 km^{2} (0.99 sq mi)
- Elevation: 420 m (1,380 ft)
- Highest elevation: 602 m (1,975 ft)
- Lowest elevation: 398 m (1,306 ft)
- Population (2023): 355
  - Density: 139/km^{2} (359/sq mi)
- Time zone: UTC+01:00 (CET)
  - Summer (DST): UTC+02:00 (CEST)
- INSEE/Postal code: 65271 /65100
- ^{1} French Land Register data, which excludes lakes, ponds, glaciers > 1 km^{2} (0.386 sq mi or 247 acres) and river estuaries.

Lézignan (French pronunciation: [leziɲɑ̃]; Occitan: Lesinhan) is a village and commune in the Hautes-Pyrénées department in south-western France. It is located around 16 km (9.9 mi) south of Tarbes. As of 2023, the population of the commune was 355.

== See also ==
- Communes of the Hautes-Pyrénées department
