= Lalanne =

Lalanne may refer to:

== French communes ==
- Lalanne, Gers, in the Gers department
- Lalanne, Hautes-Pyrénées, in the Hautes-Pyrénées department
- Lalanne-Arqué, in the Gers department
- Lalanne-Trie, in the Hautes-Pyrénées department

== Other uses ==
- Lalanne (surname)
- Les Lalanne, French artist duo
