= Thuy, France =

Thuy
- Commune
- Coat of arms
- Location of Thuy
- Location within France Location within Occitanie
- Coordinates: 43°15′33″N 0°14′42″E
- Country: France
- Region: Occitania
- Department: Hautes-Pyrénées
- Arrondissement: Tarbes
- Canton: Les Coteaux
- Intercommunality: Coteaux du Val d'Arros

Government
  - Mayor (2020–2026): Eliane Darre
- Area^{1}: 0.5 km^{2} (0.19 sq mi)
- Elevation: 250 m (820 ft)
- Highest elevation: 282 m (925 ft)
- Lowest elevation: 218 m (715 ft)
- Population (2023): 18
  - Density: 36/km^{2} (93/sq mi)
- Time zone: UTC+01:00 (CET)
  - Summer (DST): UTC+02:00 (CEST)
- INSEE/Postal code: 65443 /65350
- ^{1} French Land Register data, which excludes lakes, ponds, glaciers > 1 km^{2} (0.386 sq mi or 247 acres) and river estuaries.

Thuy (French pronunciation: [tɥi]; Occitan: Tuí) is a commune in the Hautes-Pyrénées department in south-western France.

== See also ==
- Communes of the Hautes-Pyrénées department
