= Lansac, Hautes-Pyrénées =

Lansac
- Commune
- Coat of arms
- Location of Lansac
- Location within France Location within Occitanie
- Coordinates: 43°13′27″N 0°09′55″E
- Country: France
- Region: Occitania
- Department: Hautes-Pyrénées
- Arrondissement: Tarbes
- Canton: Les Coteaux
- Intercommunality: Coteaux du Val d'Arros

Government
  - Mayor (2020–2026): Christian Giuge
- Area^{1}: 3.87 km^{2} (1.49 sq mi)
- Elevation: 332 m (1,089 ft)
- Highest elevation: 406 m (1,332 ft)
- Lowest elevation: 250 m (820 ft)
- Population (2023): 185
  - Density: 47.8/km^{2} (124/sq mi)
- Time zone: UTC+01:00 (CET)
  - Summer (DST): UTC+02:00 (CEST)
- INSEE/Postal code: 65259 /65350
- ^{1} French Land Register data, which excludes lakes, ponds, glaciers > 1 km^{2} (0.386 sq mi or 247 acres) and river estuaries.

Lansac (French pronunciation: [lɑ̃sak]; Occitan: Lançac) is a commune in the Hautes-Pyrénées department in south-western France.

== See also ==
- Communes of the Hautes-Pyrénées department
