= Casterets =

- Commune
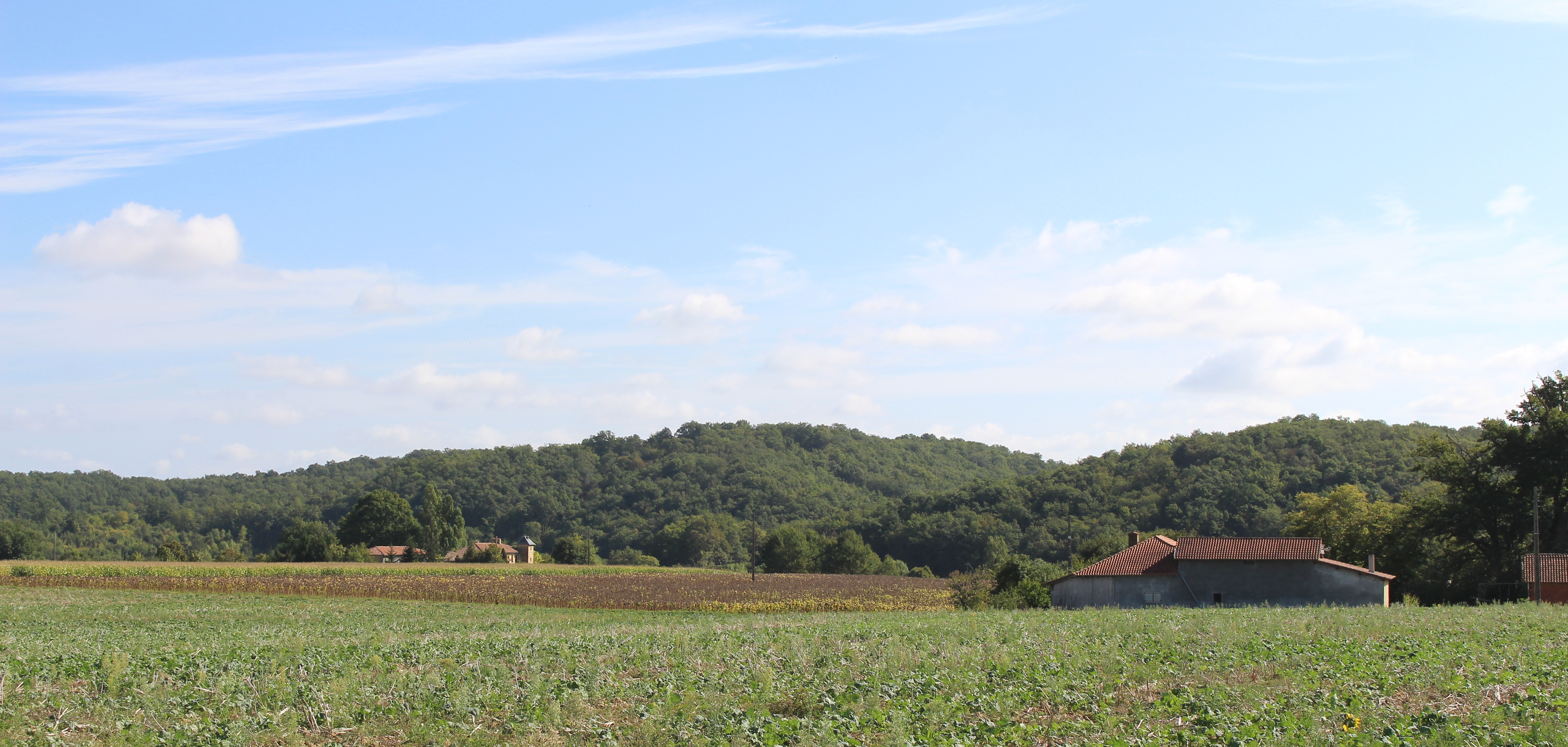
- View of Casterets

- Coat of arms
- Location of Casterets
- Location within France Location within Occitanie
- Coordinates: 43°18′50″N 0°35′25″E
- Country: France
- Region: Occitania
- Department: Hautes-Pyrénées
- Arrondissement: Tarbes
- Canton: Les Coteaux
- Intercommunality: Pays de Trie et du Magnoac

Government
  - Mayor (2024–2026): Claire Rossard
- Area^{1}: 1.86 km^{2} (0.72 sq mi)
- Elevation: 350 m (1,150 ft)
- Highest elevation: 376 m (1,234 ft)
- Lowest elevation: 290 m (950 ft)
- Population (2023): 17
  - Density: 9.1/km^{2} (24/sq mi)
- Time zone: UTC+01:00 (CET)
  - Summer (DST): UTC+02:00 (CEST)
- INSEE/Postal code: 65134 /65230
- ^{1} French Land Register data, which excludes lakes, ponds, glaciers > 1 km^{2} (0.386 sq mi or 247 acres) and river estuaries.

Casterets is a commune in the Hautes-Pyrénées department in south-western France.

== Population ==
Historical population
Year	Pop.	±% p.a.
1968	19	—
1975	18	−0.77%
1982	11	−6.79%
1990	10	−1.18%
1999	5	−7.41%
2007	15	+14.72%
2012	13	−2.82%
2017	13	+0.00%
2023	17	+4.57%
Source: INSEE

== See also ==
- Communes of the Hautes-Pyrénées department
