= Gonez =

- Commune
- Coat of arms
- Location of Gonez
- Location within France Location within Occitanie
- Coordinates: 43°14′00″N 0°12′52″E
- Country: France
- Region: Occitania
- Department: Hautes-Pyrénées
- Arrondissement: Tarbes
- Canton: Les Coteaux
- Intercommunality: Coteaux du Val d'Arros
- Area^{1}: 1.08 km^{2} (0.42 sq mi)
- Elevation: 290 m (950 ft)
- Highest elevation: 343 m (1,125 ft)
- Lowest elevation: 232 m (761 ft)
- Population (2023): 26
  - Density: 24/km^{2} (62/sq mi)
- Time zone: UTC+01:00 (CET)
  - Summer (DST): UTC+02:00 (CEST)
- INSEE/Postal code: 65204 /65350
- ^{1} French Land Register data, which excludes lakes, ponds, glaciers > 1 km^{2} (0.386 sq mi or 247 acres) and river estuaries.

Gonez (Occitan: Gònes) is a commune in the Hautes-Pyrénées department in south-western France.

== See also ==
- Communes of the Hautes-Pyrénées department
