= Aubarède =

- Commune
- Coat of arms
- Location of Aubarède
- Location within France Location within Occitanie
- Coordinates: 43°16′23″N 0°14′19″E
- Country: France
- Region: Occitania
- Department: Hautes-Pyrénées
- Arrondissement: Tarbes
- Canton: Les Coteaux
- Intercommunality: Coteaux du Val d'Arros

Government
  - Mayor (2020–2026): Marie Angèle Carrere
- Area^{1}: 4.85 km^{2} (1.87 sq mi)
- Elevation: 212 m (696 ft)
- Highest elevation: 426 m (1,398 ft)
- Lowest elevation: 210 m (690 ft)
- Population (2023): 283
  - Density: 58.4/km^{2} (151/sq mi)
- Time zone: UTC+01:00 (CET)
  - Summer (DST): UTC+02:00 (CEST)
- INSEE/Postal code: 65044 /65350
- ^{1} French Land Register data, which excludes lakes, ponds, glaciers > 1 km^{2} (0.386 sq mi or 247 acres) and river estuaries.

Aubarède (French pronunciation: [obaʁɛd]; Occitan: Avereda) is a commune in the Hautes-Pyrénées department in southwestern France.

== Population ==
Historical population
Year	Pop.	±% p.a.
1968	185	—
1975	168	−1.37%
1982	159	−0.78%
1990	196	+2.65%
1999	223	+1.44%
2007	240	+0.92%
2012	272	+2.53%
2017	297	+1.77%
2023	283	−0.80%
Source: INSEE

== See also ==
- Communes of the Hautes-Pyrénées department
