= Soréac =

- Commune
- Coat of arms
- Location of Soréac
- Location within France Location within Occitanie
- Coordinates: 43°18′51″N 0°09′34″E
- Country: France
- Region: Occitania
- Department: Hautes-Pyrénées
- Arrondissement: Tarbes
- Canton: Les Coteaux
- Intercommunality: Coteaux du Val-d'Arros

Government
  - Mayor (2020–2026): Roland Ferrero
- Area^{1}: 2.31 km^{2} (0.89 sq mi)
- Elevation: 262 m (860 ft)
- Highest elevation: 333 m (1,093 ft)
- Lowest elevation: 237 m (778 ft)
- Population (2023): 49
  - Density: 21/km^{2} (55/sq mi)
- Time zone: UTC+01:00 (CET)
  - Summer (DST): UTC+02:00 (CEST)
- INSEE/Postal code: 65430 /65350
- ^{1} French Land Register data, which excludes lakes, ponds, glaciers > 1 km^{2} (0.386 sq mi or 247 acres) and river estuaries.

Soréac (French pronunciation: [sɔʁeak]; Occitan: Soriac) is a commune in the Hautes-Pyrénées department in south-western France.

== See also ==
- Communes of the Hautes-Pyrénées department
