= Castelvieilh =

- Commune
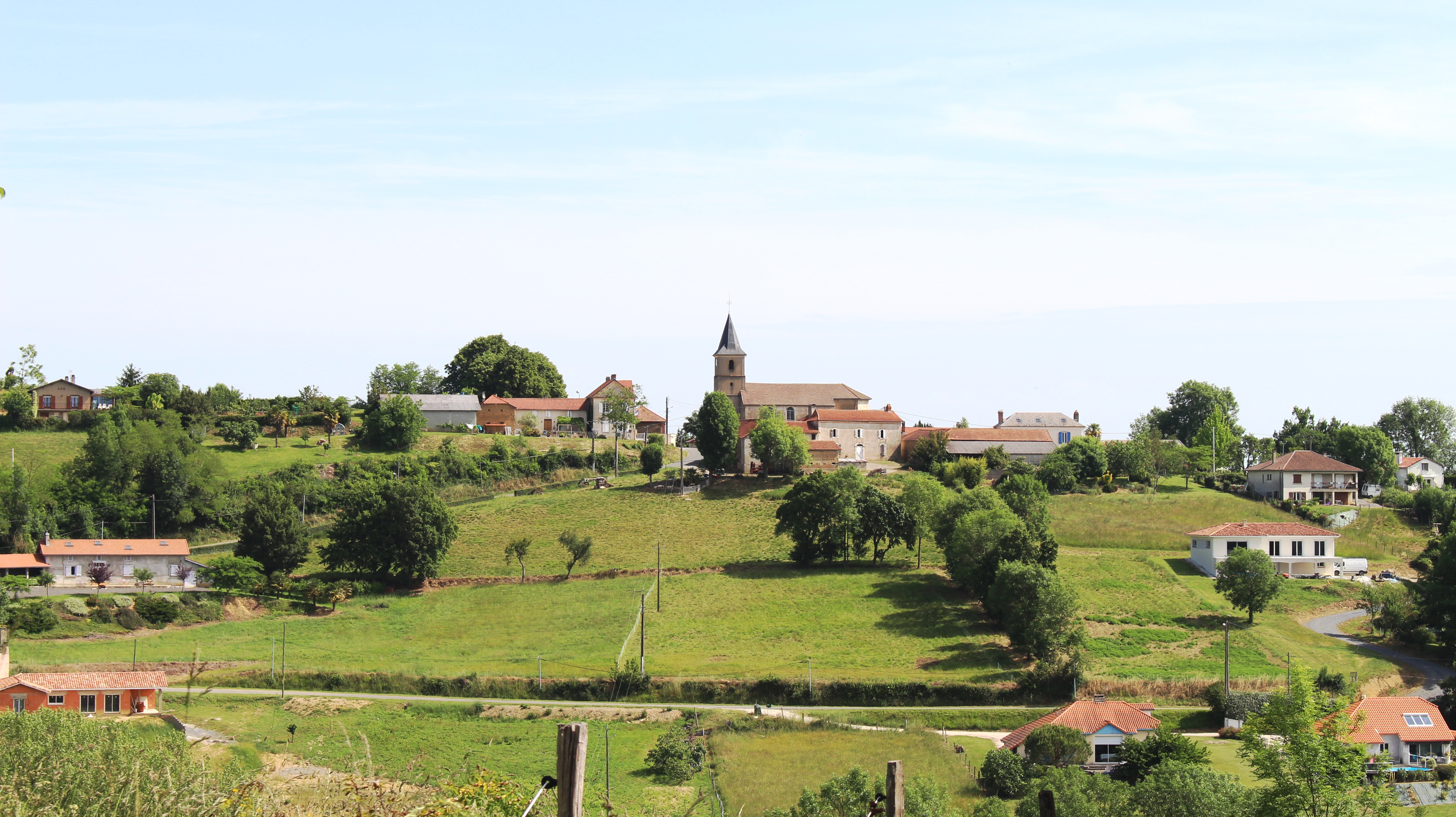
- View of Castelvieilh

- Coat of arms
- Location of Castelvieilh
- Location within France Location within Occitanie
- Coordinates: 43°17′05″N 0°11′48″E
- Country: France
- Region: Occitania
- Department: Hautes-Pyrénées
- Arrondissement: Tarbes
- Canton: Les Coteaux
- Intercommunality: Coteaux du Val d'Arros

Government
  - Mayor (2020–2026): Jean-Marc Castor
- Area^{1}: 5.31 km^{2} (2.05 sq mi)
- Elevation: 366 m (1,201 ft)
- Highest elevation: 360 m (1,180 ft)
- Lowest elevation: 223 m (732 ft)
- Population (2023): 249
  - Density: 46.9/km^{2} (121/sq mi)
- Time zone: UTC+01:00 (CET)
  - Summer (DST): UTC+02:00 (CEST)
- INSEE/Postal code: 65131 /65350
- ^{1} French Land Register data, which excludes lakes, ponds, glaciers > 1 km^{2} (0.386 sq mi or 247 acres) and river estuaries.

Castelvieilh (French pronunciation: [kastɛlvjɛj]; Occitan: Castèthvièlh) is a commune in the Hautes-Pyrénées department in south-western France.

== Geography ==
=== Climate ===
Castelvieilh has an oceanic climate (Köppen climate classification Cfb) closely bordering on a humid subtropical climate (Cfa). The average annual temperature in Castelvieilh is 13.5 °C (56.3 °F). The average annual rainfall is 956.0 mm (37.64 in) with May as the wettest month. The temperatures are highest on average in August, at around 21.2 °C (70.2 °F), and lowest in January, at around 6.6 °C (43.9 °F). The highest temperature ever recorded in Castelvieilh was 39.6 °C (103.3 °F) on 4 August 2003; the coldest temperature ever recorded was −11.0 °C (12.2 °F) on 8 February 2012.

Climate data for Castelvieilh (1991−2020 normals, extremes 1988−2020)
Month	Jan	Feb	Mar	Apr	May	Jun	Jul	Aug	Sep	Oct	Nov	Dec	Year
Record high °C (°F)	22.3 (72.1)	25.7 (78.3)	28.0 (82.4)	30.0 (86.0)	32.3 (90.1)	37.8 (100.0)	38.5 (101.3)	39.6 (103.3)	35.0 (95.0)	32.0 (89.6)	26.0 (78.8)	23.5 (74.3)	39.6 (103.3)
Mean daily maximum °C (°F)	10.0 (50.0)	11.3 (52.3)	14.4 (57.9)	16.8 (62.2)	20.3 (68.5)	23.7 (74.7)	25.8 (78.4)	26.1 (79.0)	23.0 (73.4)	18.9 (66.0)	13.2 (55.8)	10.8 (51.4)	17.9 (64.2)
Daily mean °C (°F)	6.6 (43.9)	7.4 (45.3)	9.9 (49.8)	12.1 (53.8)	15.5 (59.9)	18.8 (65.8)	20.9 (69.6)	21.2 (70.2)	18.3 (64.9)	14.7 (58.5)	9.7 (49.5)	7.4 (45.3)	13.5 (56.3)
Mean daily minimum °C (°F)	3.3 (37.9)	3.5 (38.3)	5.3 (41.5)	7.4 (45.3)	10.8 (51.4)	13.9 (57.0)	15.9 (60.6)	16.3 (61.3)	13.5 (56.3)	10.5 (50.9)	6.2 (43.2)	4.1 (39.4)	9.2 (48.6)
Record low °C (°F)	−7.1 (19.2)	−11.0 (12.2)	−8.3 (17.1)	0.0 (32.0)	0.3 (32.5)	5.5 (41.9)	9.0 (48.2)	7.5 (45.5)	4.5 (40.1)	−1.5 (29.3)	−6.0 (21.2)	−9.0 (15.8)	−11.0 (12.2)
Average precipitation mm (inches)	85.6 (3.37)	65.4 (2.57)	70.6 (2.78)	102.1 (4.02)	104.8 (4.13)	80.4 (3.17)	67.6 (2.66)	59.6 (2.35)	63.8 (2.51)	73.2 (2.88)	102.4 (4.03)	80.5 (3.17)	956.0 (37.64)
Average precipitation days (≥ 1.0 mm)	11.6	10.1	9.9	12.0	12.3	9.3	7.8	8.1	8.5	10.0	12.0	10.4	122.0
Source: Météo-France

== See also ==
- Communes of the Hautes-Pyrénées department
