= Sadournin =

- Commune
- Coat of arms
- Location of Sadournin
- Location within France Location within Occitanie
- Coordinates: 43°18′58″N 0°24′06″E
- Country: France
- Region: Occitania
- Department: Hautes-Pyrénées
- Arrondissement: Tarbes
- Canton: Les Coteaux
- Intercommunality: Pays de Trie et Magnoac

Government
  - Mayor (2020–2026): Henri Rey
- Area^{1}: 12.41 km^{2} (4.79 sq mi)
- Elevation: 330 m (1,080 ft)
- Highest elevation: 385 m (1,263 ft)
- Lowest elevation: 220 m (720 ft)
- Population (2023): 190
  - Density: 15/km^{2} (40/sq mi)
- Time zone: UTC+01:00 (CET)
  - Summer (DST): UTC+02:00 (CEST)
- INSEE/Postal code: 65383 /65220
- ^{1} French Land Register data, which excludes lakes, ponds, glaciers > 1 km^{2} (0.386 sq mi or 247 acres) and river estuaries.

Sadournin (French pronunciation: [saduʁnɛ̃]; Occitan: Sadornin) is a commune in the Hautes-Pyrénées department in south-western France.

== See also ==
- Communes of the Hautes-Pyrénées department
