= Campuzan =

- Commune
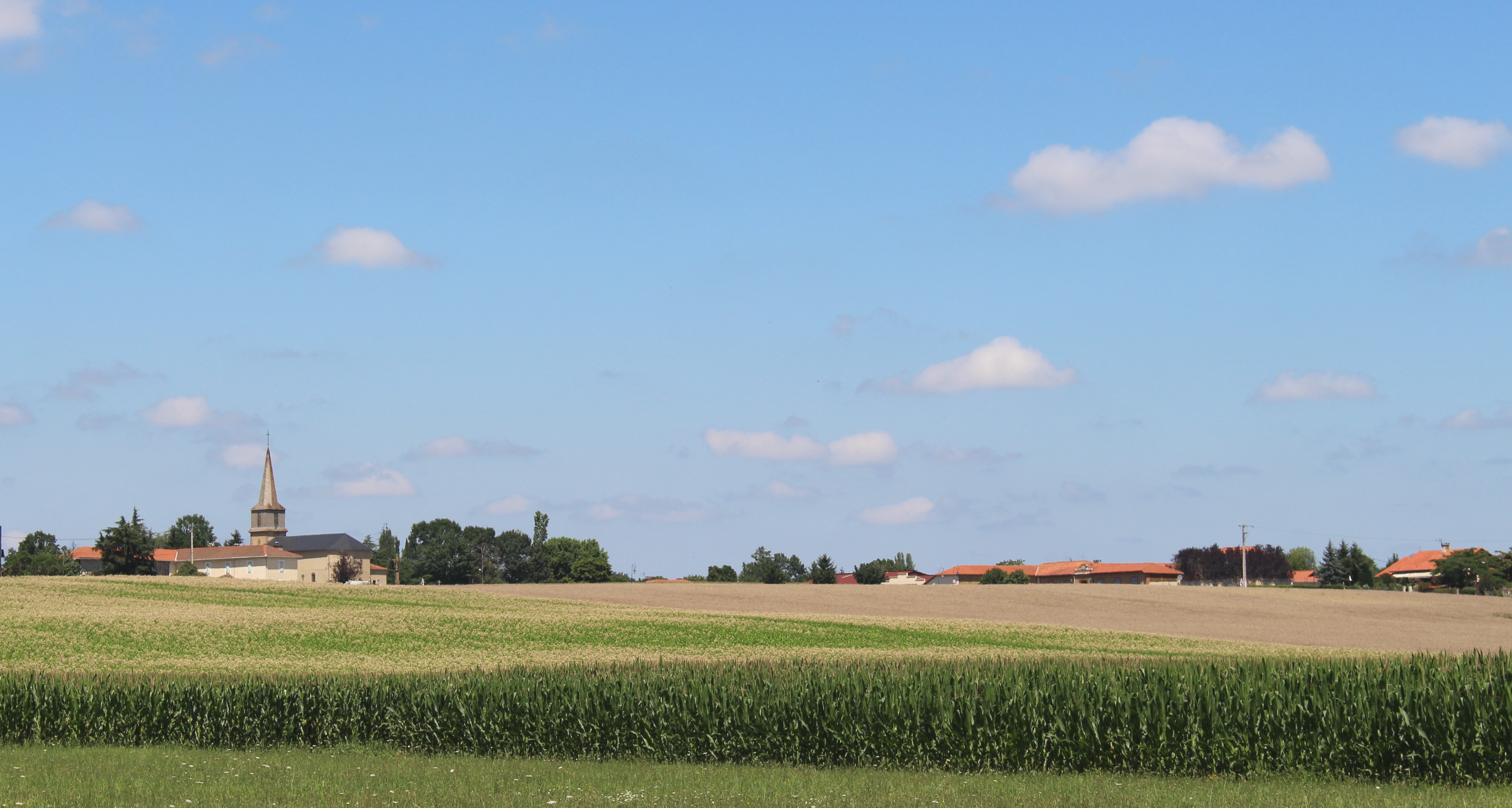
- View of Campuzan

- Coat of arms
- Location of Campuzan
- Location within France Location within Occitanie
- Coordinates: 43°16′20″N 0°25′45″E
- Country: France
- Region: Occitania
- Department: Hautes-Pyrénées
- Arrondissement: Tarbes
- Canton: Les Coteaux
- Intercommunality: Pays de Trie et Magnoac

Government
  - Mayor (2020–2026): Guy Fontan
- Area^{1}: 6.62 km^{2} (2.56 sq mi)
- Elevation: 300 m (980 ft)
- Highest elevation: 333 m (1,093 ft)
- Lowest elevation: 249 m (817 ft)
- Population (2023): 147
  - Density: 22.2/km^{2} (57.5/sq mi)
- Time zone: UTC+01:00 (CET)
  - Summer (DST): UTC+02:00 (CEST)
- INSEE/Postal code: 65126 /65230
- ^{1} French Land Register data, which excludes lakes, ponds, glaciers > 1 km^{2} (0.386 sq mi or 247 acres) and river estuaries.

Campuzan (French pronunciation: [kɑ̃pyzɑ̃]; Occitan: Campudan) is a commune in the Hautes-Pyrénées department in south-western France.

The area is known for its mountainous agricultural landscape of villages, farms, fields, upland pastures and winding mountain roads.

Before the French Revolution, this town was one of many within the former province of Gascony before the region was renamed and re-bordered as the Occitanie region of France.

== See also ==
- Communes of the Hautes-Pyrénées department
