= Devèze =

- Commune
- Coat of arms
- Location of Devèze
- Location within France Location within Occitanie
- Coordinates: 43°16′21″N 0°32′53″E
- Country: France
- Region: Occitania
- Department: Hautes-Pyrénées
- Arrondissement: Tarbes
- Canton: Les Coteaux
- Intercommunality: Pays de Trie et du Magnoac

Government
  - Mayor (2020–2026): Jean-Pierre Ader
- Area^{1}: 5.05 km^{2} (1.95 sq mi)
- Elevation: 316 m (1,037 ft)
- Highest elevation: 422 m (1,385 ft)
- Lowest elevation: 277 m (909 ft)
- Population (2023): 50
  - Density: 9.9/km^{2} (26/sq mi)
- Time zone: UTC+01:00 (CET)
  - Summer (DST): UTC+02:00 (CEST)
- INSEE/Postal code: 65155 /65230
- ^{1} French Land Register data, which excludes lakes, ponds, glaciers > 1 km^{2} (0.386 sq mi or 247 acres) and river estuaries.

Devèze (French pronunciation: [dəvɛz]; Occitan: Devesa) is a commune in the Hautes-Pyrénées department in south-western France.

== See also ==
- Communes of the Hautes-Pyrénées department
