= Souyeaux =

- Commune
- Coat of arms
- Location of Souyeaux
- Location within France Location within Occitanie
- Coordinates: 43°14′30″N 0°10′32″E
- Country: France
- Region: Occitania
- Department: Hautes-Pyrénées
- Arrondissement: Tarbes
- Canton: Les Coteaux
- Intercommunality: Coteaux du Val d'Arros

Government
  - Mayor (2020–2026): Pierre Lacoste
- Area^{1}: 6.02 km^{2} (2.32 sq mi)
- Elevation: 380 m (1,250 ft)
- Highest elevation: 427 m (1,401 ft)
- Lowest elevation: 271 m (889 ft)
- Population (2023): 296
  - Density: 49.2/km^{2} (127/sq mi)
- Time zone: UTC+01:00 (CET)
  - Summer (DST): UTC+02:00 (CEST)
- INSEE/Postal code: 65436 /65350
- ^{1} French Land Register data, which excludes lakes, ponds, glaciers > 1 km^{2} (0.386 sq mi or 247 acres) and river estuaries.

Souyeaux (French pronunciation: [sujo]; Occitan: Sogèus) is a commune in the Hautes-Pyrénées department in south-western France. It is around 7 km east of Tarbes.

== See also ==
- Communes of the Hautes-Pyrénées department
