= Collongues, Hautes-Pyrénées =

Collongues
- Commune
- Coat of arms
- Location of Collongues
- Location within France Location within Occitanie
- Coordinates: 43°17′19″N 0°09′46″E
- Country: France
- Region: Occitania
- Department: Hautes-Pyrénées
- Arrondissement: Tarbes
- Canton: Les Coteaux
- Intercommunality: Coteaux du Val-d'Arros
- Area^{1}: 2.14 km^{2} (0.83 sq mi)
- Elevation: 100 m (330 ft)
- Highest elevation: 340 m (1,120 ft)
- Lowest elevation: 246 m (807 ft)
- Population (2023): 153
  - Density: 71.5/km^{2} (185/sq mi)
- Time zone: UTC+01:00 (CET)
  - Summer (DST): UTC+02:00 (CEST)
- INSEE/Postal code: 65151 /65350
- ^{1} French Land Register data, which excludes lakes, ponds, glaciers > 1 km^{2} (0.386 sq mi or 247 acres) and river estuaries.

Collongues (Occitan: Còllongas) is a commune in the Hautes-Pyrénées department in south-western France.

== See also ==
- Communes of the Hautes-Pyrénées department
