= Sariac-Magnoac =

- Commune
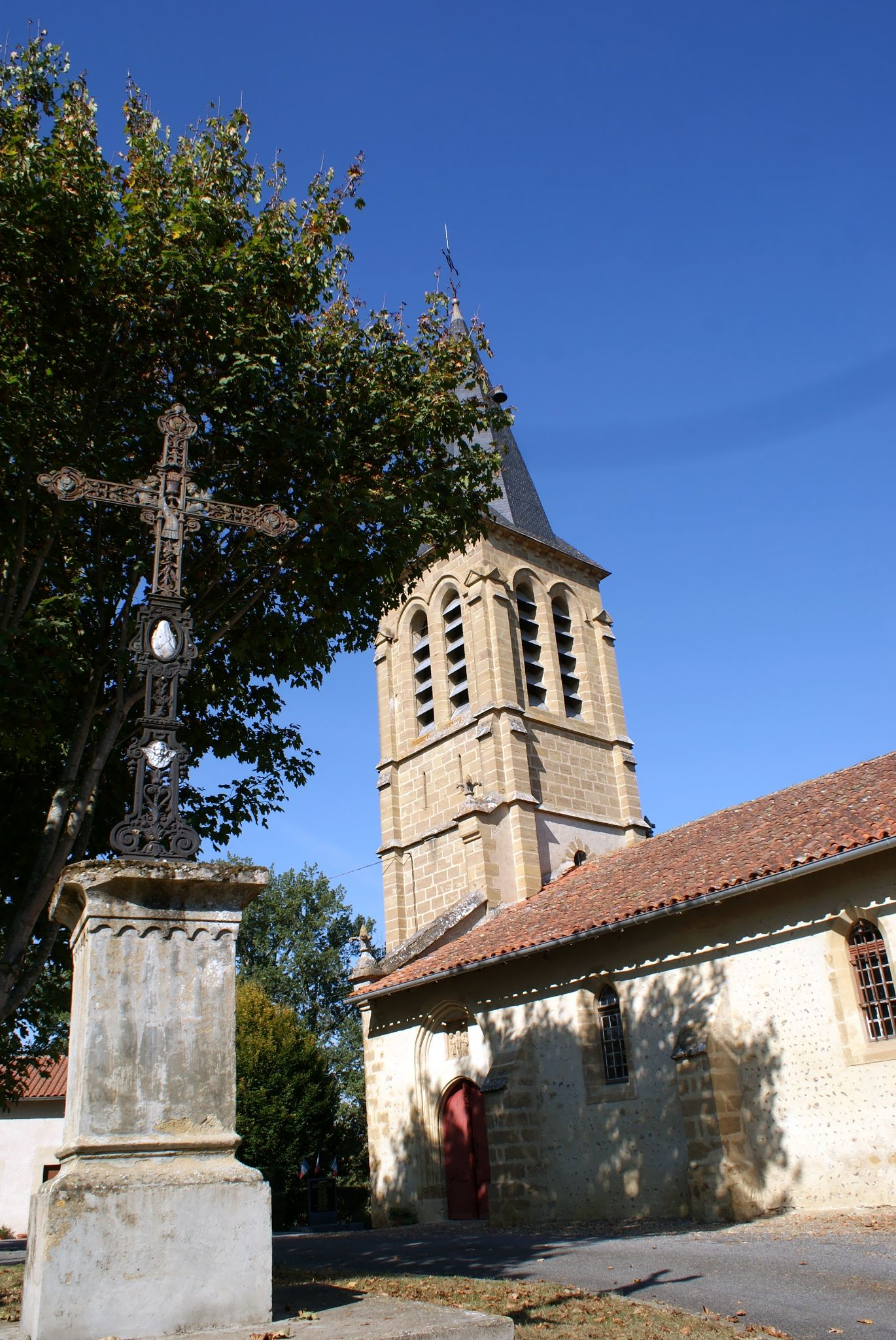
- The church of Sariac-Magnoac

- Coat of arms
- Location of Sariac-Magnoac
- Location within France Location within Occitanie
- Coordinates: 43°18′41″N 0°32′32″E
- Country: France
- Region: Occitania
- Department: Hautes-Pyrénées
- Arrondissement: Tarbes
- Canton: Les Coteaux
- Intercommunality: Pays de Trie et du Magnoac

Government
  - Mayor (2020–2026): Myriam Solles
- Area^{1}: 10.93 km^{2} (4.22 sq mi)
- Elevation: 300 m (980 ft)
- Highest elevation: 420 m (1,380 ft)
- Lowest elevation: 243 m (797 ft)
- Population (2023): 162
  - Density: 14.8/km^{2} (38.4/sq mi)
- Time zone: UTC+01:00 (CET)
  - Summer (DST): UTC+02:00 (CEST)
- INSEE/Postal code: 65404 /65230
- ^{1} French Land Register data, which excludes lakes, ponds, glaciers > 1 km^{2} (0.386 sq mi or 247 acres) and river estuaries.

Sariac-Magnoac (French pronunciation: [saʁjak maɲɔak]; Occitan: Sariac) is a commune in the Hautes-Pyrénées department in south-western France.

== See also ==
- Communes of the Hautes-Pyrénées department
