= Fréchède =

- Commune
- Coat of arms
- Location of Fréchède
- Location within France Location within Occitanie
- Coordinates: 43°21′53″N 0°15′37″E
- Country: France
- Region: Occitania
- Department: Hautes-Pyrénées
- Arrondissement: Tarbes
- Canton: Les Coteaux
- Intercommunality: Pays de Trie et Magnoac
- Area^{1}: 5.43 km^{2} (2.10 sq mi)
- Elevation: 300 m (980 ft)
- Highest elevation: 385 m (1,263 ft)
- Lowest elevation: 204 m (669 ft)
- Population (2023): 43
  - Density: 7.9/km^{2} (21/sq mi)
- Time zone: UTC+01:00 (CET)
  - Summer (DST): UTC+02:00 (CEST)
- INSEE/Postal code: 65178 /65220
- ^{1} French Land Register data, which excludes lakes, ponds, glaciers > 1 km^{2} (0.386 sq mi or 247 acres) and river estuaries.

Fréchède (French pronunciation: [fʁeʃɛd]; Occitan: Freisheda) is a commune in the Hautes-Pyrénées department in south-western France.

== See also ==
- Communes of the Hautes-Pyrénées department
