= Sère-Rustaing =

- Commune
- Coat of arms
- Location of Sère-Rustaing
- Location within France Location within Occitanie
- Coordinates: 43°15′47″N 0°17′42″E
- Country: France
- Region: Occitania
- Department: Hautes-Pyrénées
- Arrondissement: Tarbes
- Canton: Les Coteaux
- Intercommunality: Pays de Trie et Magnoac
- Area^{1}: 5.29 km^{2} (2.04 sq mi)
- Elevation: 400 m (1,300 ft)
- Highest elevation: 456 m (1,496 ft)
- Lowest elevation: 330 m (1,080 ft)
- Population (2023): 127
  - Density: 24.0/km^{2} (62.2/sq mi)
- Time zone: UTC+01:00 (CET)
  - Summer (DST): UTC+02:00 (CEST)
- INSEE/Postal code: 65423 /65220
- ^{1} French Land Register data, which excludes lakes, ponds, glaciers > 1 km^{2} (0.386 sq mi or 247 acres) and river estuaries.

Sère-Rustaing (French pronunciation: [sɛʁ ʁystɛ̃]; Occitan: Cèra d'Arrostanh) is a commune in the Hautes-Pyrénées department in south-western France.

== See also ==
- Communes of the Hautes-Pyrénées department
