= Estampures =

- Commune
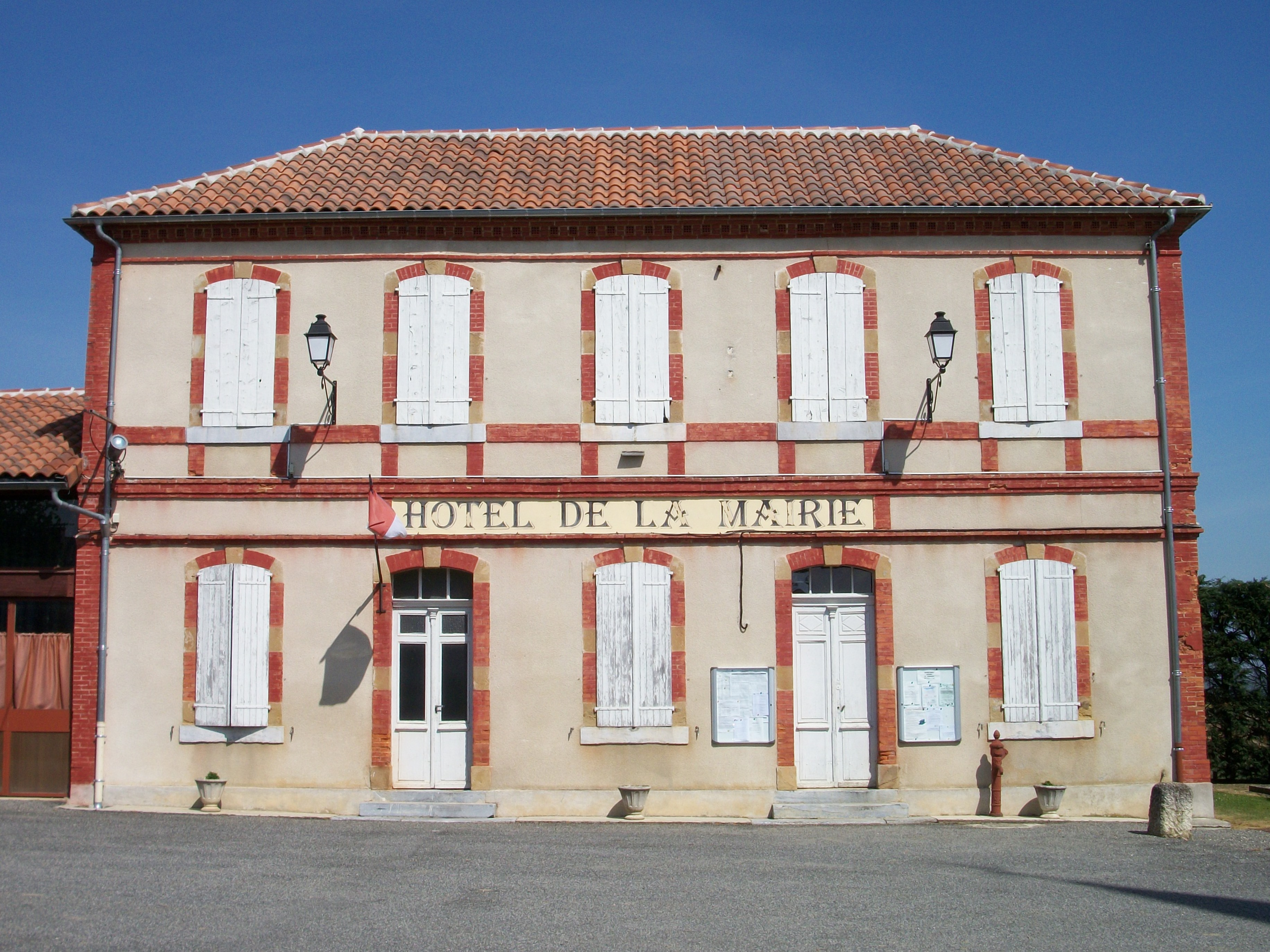
- The town hall of Estampures

- Coat of arms
- Location of Estampures
- Location within France Location within Occitanie
- Coordinates: 43°22′21″N 0°17′00″E
- Country: France
- Region: Occitania
- Department: Hautes-Pyrénées
- Arrondissement: Tarbes
- Canton: Les Coteaux
- Intercommunality: Pays de Trie et Magnoac

Government
  - Mayor (2020–2026): Stéphanie Marie-Ernestine
- Area^{1}: 5.56 km^{2} (2.15 sq mi)
- Elevation: 260 m (850 ft)
- Highest elevation: 330 m (1,080 ft)
- Lowest elevation: 221 m (725 ft)
- Population (2023): 73
  - Density: 13/km^{2} (34/sq mi)
- Time zone: UTC+01:00 (CET)
  - Summer (DST): UTC+02:00 (CEST)
- INSEE/Postal code: 65170 /65220
- ^{1} French Land Register data, which excludes lakes, ponds, glaciers > 1 km^{2} (0.386 sq mi or 247 acres) and river estuaries.

Estampures (French pronunciation: [ɛstɑ̃pyʁ]; Occitan: Estampuras) is a commune in the Hautes-Pyrénées department in south-western France.

== See also ==
- Communes of the Hautes-Pyrénées department
