= Lizos =

- Commune
- Coat of arms
- Location of Lizos
- Location within France Location within Occitanie
- Coordinates: 43°15′52″N 0°08′47″E
- Country: France
- Region: Occitania
- Department: Hautes-Pyrénées
- Arrondissement: Tarbes
- Canton: Les Coteaux
- Intercommunality: Coteaux du Val-d'Arros

Government
  - Mayor (2021–2026): Jean-Louis Lapasset
- Area^{1}: 1.73 km^{2} (0.67 sq mi)
- Elevation: 378 m (1,240 ft)
- Highest elevation: 409 m (1,342 ft)
- Lowest elevation: 311 m (1,020 ft)
- Population (2023): 109
  - Density: 63.0/km^{2} (163/sq mi)
- Time zone: UTC+01:00 (CET)
  - Summer (DST): UTC+02:00 (CEST)
- INSEE/Postal code: 65276 /65350
- ^{1} French Land Register data, which excludes lakes, ponds, glaciers > 1 km^{2} (0.386 sq mi or 247 acres) and river estuaries.

Lizos is a commune in the Hautes-Pyrénées department in south-western France.

== See also ==
- Communes of the Hautes-Pyrénées department
