= Jacque, Hautes-Pyrénées =

Jacque
- Commune
- Coat of arms
- Location of Jacque
- Location within France Location within Occitanie
- Coordinates: 43°19′14″N 0°12′54″E
- Country: France
- Region: Occitania
- Department: Hautes-Pyrénées
- Arrondissement: Tarbes
- Canton: Les Coteaux
- Intercommunality: Coteaux du Val d'Arros

Government
  - Mayor (2020–2026): Marc Gualbert
- Area^{1}: 1.87 km^{2} (0.72 sq mi)
- Elevation: 279 m (915 ft)
- Highest elevation: 295 m (968 ft)
- Lowest elevation: 189 m (620 ft)
- Population (2023): 68
  - Density: 36/km^{2} (94/sq mi)
- Time zone: UTC+01:00 (CET)
  - Summer (DST): UTC+02:00 (CEST)
- INSEE/Postal code: 65232 /65350
- ^{1} French Land Register data, which excludes lakes, ponds, glaciers > 1 km^{2} (0.386 sq mi or 247 acres) and river estuaries.

Jacque (French pronunciation: [ʒak]; Occitan: Jaca) is a commune in the Hautes-Pyrénées department in south-western France.

== Population ==
Historical population
Year	Pop.	±% p.a.
1968	38	—
1975	40	+0.74%
1982	48	+2.64%
1990	49	+0.26%
1999	54	+1.09%
2007	56	+0.46%
2012	77	+6.58%
2017	74	−0.79%
2023	68	−1.40%
Source: INSEE

== See also ==
- Communes of the Hautes-Pyrénées department
