= Bonnefont =

- Commune
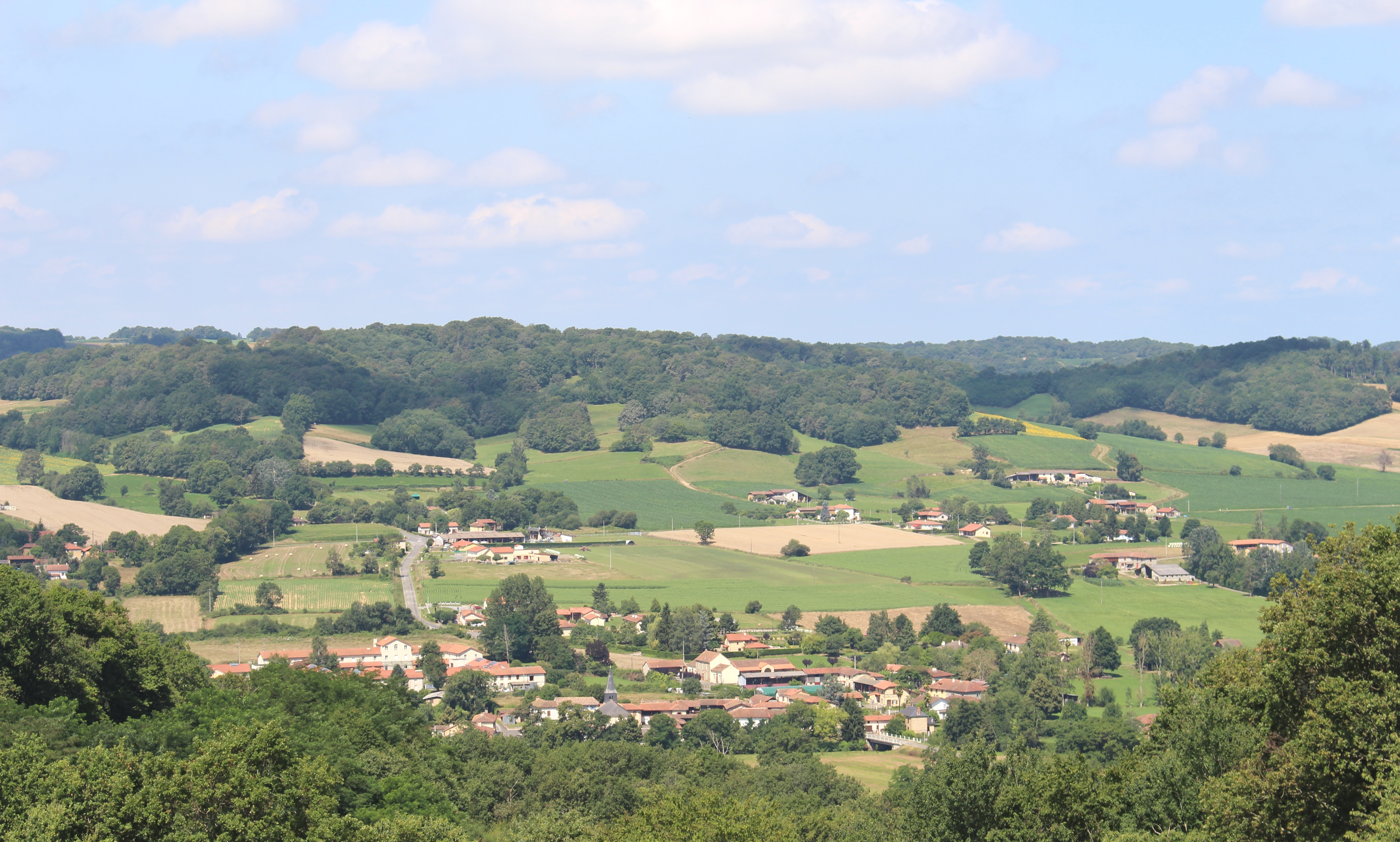
- View of Bonnefont

- Coat of arms
- Location of Bonnefont
- Location within France Location within Occitanie
- Coordinates: 43°15′04″N 0°20′49″E
- Country: France
- Region: Occitania
- Department: Hautes-Pyrénées
- Arrondissement: Tarbes
- Canton: Les Coteaux

Government
  - Mayor (2020–2026): Anne-Marie Bruzeaud
- Area^{1}: 15.37 km^{2} (5.93 sq mi)
- Elevation: 380 m (1,250 ft)
- Highest elevation: 476 m (1,562 ft)
- Lowest elevation: 275 m (902 ft)
- Population (2023): 314
  - Density: 20.4/km^{2} (52.9/sq mi)
- Time zone: UTC+01:00 (CET)
  - Summer (DST): UTC+02:00 (CEST)
- INSEE/Postal code: 65095 /65220
- ^{1} French Land Register data, which excludes lakes, ponds, glaciers > 1 km^{2} (0.386 sq mi or 247 acres) and river estuaries.

Bonnefont (French pronunciation: [bɔnfɔ̃]; Occitan: Bonahont) is a commune in the Hautes-Pyrénées department in southwestern France.

== Population ==
Historical population
Year	Pop.	±% p.a.
1968	463	—
1975	422	−1.32%
1982	313	−4.18%
1990	358	+1.69%
1999	313	−1.48%
2007	348	+1.33%
2012	350	+0.11%
2017	339	−0.64%
2023	314	−1.27%
Source: INSEE

== See also ==
- Communes of the Hautes-Pyrénées department
