= Tournous-Darré =

- Commune
- Coat of arms
- Location of Tournous-Darré
- Location within France Location within Occitanie
- Coordinates: 43°17′18″N 0°21′43″E
- Country: France
- Region: Occitania
- Department: Hautes-Pyrénées
- Arrondissement: Tarbes
- Canton: Les Coteaux
- Intercommunality: Pays de Trie et Magnoac
- Area^{1}: 5.63 km^{2} (2.17 sq mi)
- Elevation: 250 m (820 ft)
- Highest elevation: 355 m (1,165 ft)
- Lowest elevation: 249 m (817 ft)
- Population (2023): 76
  - Density: 13/km^{2} (35/sq mi)
- Time zone: UTC+01:00 (CET)
  - Summer (DST): UTC+02:00 (CEST)
- INSEE/Postal code: 65448 /65220
- ^{1} French Land Register data, which excludes lakes, ponds, glaciers > 1 km^{2} (0.386 sq mi or 247 acres) and river estuaries.

Tournous-Darré is a commune in the Hautes-Pyrénées department in south-western France.

== See also ==
- Communes of the Hautes-Pyrénées department
