= Monlong =

- Commune
- Coat of arms
- Location of Monlong
- Location within France Location within Occitanie
- Coordinates: 43°12′26″N 0°27′54″E
- Country: France
- Region: Occitania
- Department: Hautes-Pyrénées
- Arrondissement: Tarbes
- Canton: Les Coteaux
- Intercommunality: Pays de Trie et du Magnoac

Government
  - Mayor (2020–2026): Michel Fis
- Area^{1}: 7.21 km^{2} (2.78 sq mi)
- Elevation: 625 m (2,051 ft)
- Highest elevation: 529 m (1,736 ft)
- Lowest elevation: 372 m (1,220 ft)
- Population (2023): 108
  - Density: 15.0/km^{2} (38.8/sq mi)
- Time zone: UTC+01:00 (CET)
  - Summer (DST): UTC+02:00 (CEST)
- INSEE/Postal code: 65316 /65670
- ^{1} French Land Register data, which excludes lakes, ponds, glaciers > 1 km^{2} (0.386 sq mi or 247 acres) and river estuaries.

Monlong (French pronunciation: [mɔ̃lɔ̃]; Occitan: Montlong) is a commune in the Hautes-Pyrénées department in south-western France.

Monlong is a small village in the Hautes-Pyrénées area of the Occitanie. The mayor, Michelle Castes, has been very active in building the profile of the village in the region as it sits on the main D929 that runs from Lannemezan up to Auch. The village has a post office and a chambres d'hote, La Cassoulere.

== See also ==
- Communes of the Hautes-Pyrénées department
