= Castéra-Lou =

- Commune
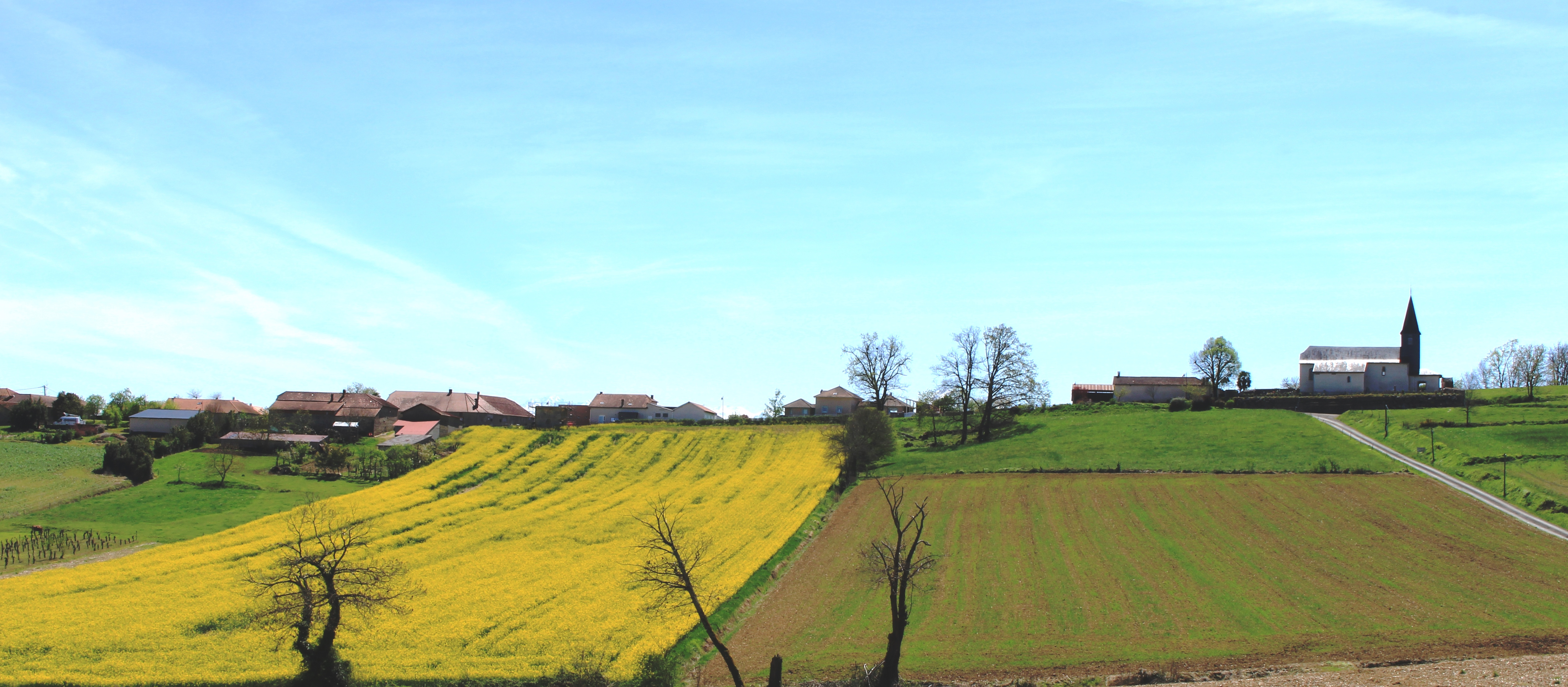
- View of Castéra-Lou

- Coat of arms
- Location of Castéra-Lou
- Location within France Location within Occitanie
- Coordinates: 43°19′25″N 0°08′48″E
- Country: France
- Region: Occitania
- Department: Hautes-Pyrénées
- Arrondissement: Tarbes
- Canton: Les Coteaux
- Intercommunality: Coteaux du Val-d'Arros

Government
  - Mayor (2020–2026): Sabine Cha
- Area^{1}: 4.82 km^{2} (1.86 sq mi)
- Elevation: 300 m (980 ft)
- Highest elevation: 332 m (1,089 ft)
- Lowest elevation: 231 m (758 ft)
- Population (2023): 220
  - Density: 46/km^{2} (120/sq mi)
- Time zone: UTC+01:00 (CET)
  - Summer (DST): UTC+02:00 (CEST)
- INSEE/Postal code: 65133 /65350
- ^{1} French Land Register data, which excludes lakes, ponds, glaciers > 1 km^{2} (0.386 sq mi or 247 acres) and river estuaries.

Castéra-Lou (French pronunciation: [kasteʁa lu]; Occitan: Lo Casterar) is a commune in the Hautes-Pyrénées department in south-western France.

== See also ==
- Communes of the Hautes-Pyrénées department
