= Oléac-Debat =

- Commune
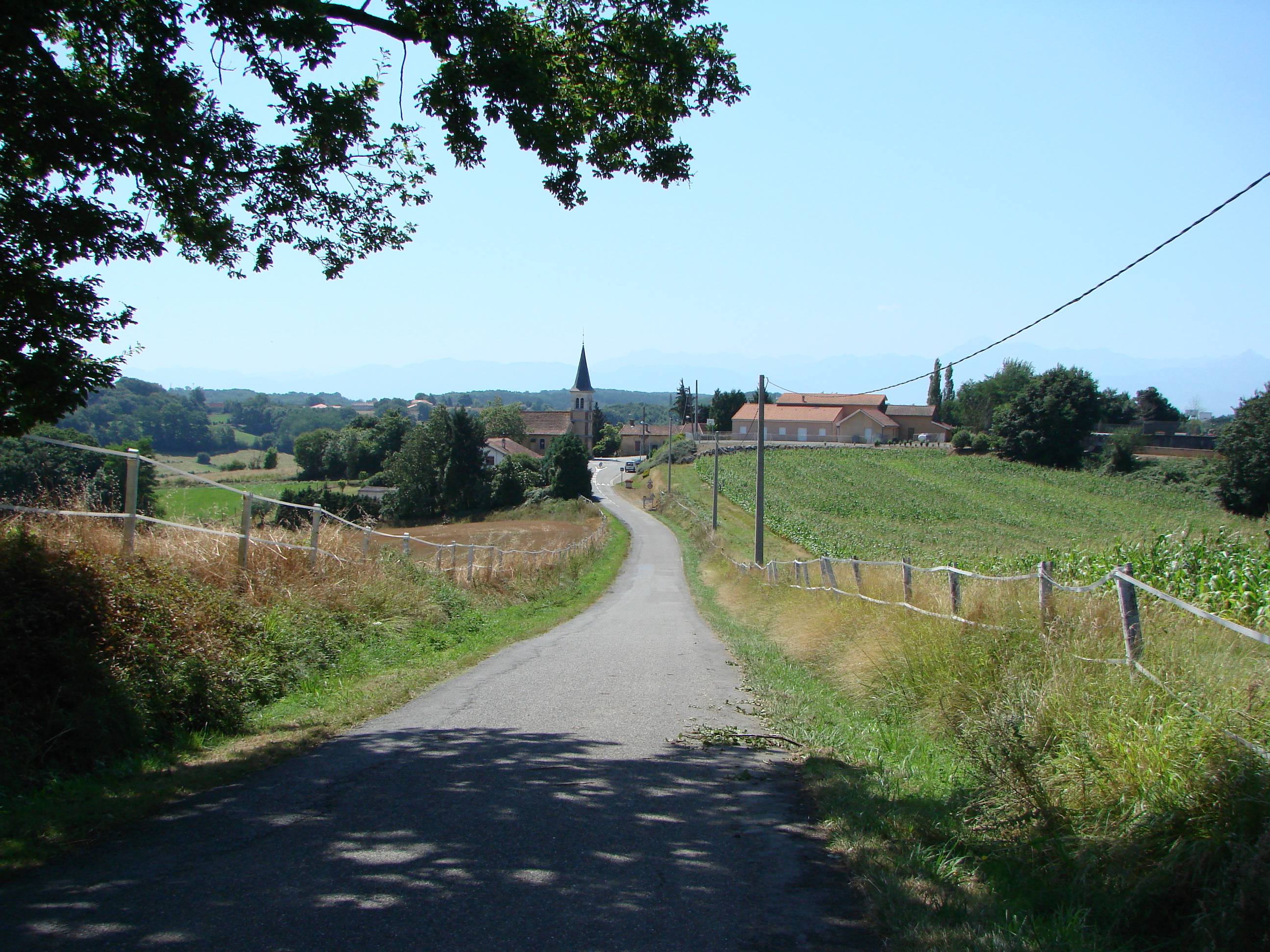
- Entrance to the village church on the left, right school
- Location of Oléac-Debat
- Location within France Location within Occitanie
- Coordinates: 43°16′13″N 0°08′20″E
- Country: France
- Region: Occitania
- Department: Hautes-Pyrénées
- Arrondissement: Tarbes
- Canton: Les Coteaux
- Intercommunality: Coteaux du Val-d'Arros

Government
  - Mayor (2020–2026): Christian Jouret
- Area^{1}: 1.94 km^{2} (0.75 sq mi)
- Elevation: 380 m (1,250 ft)
- Highest elevation: 382 m (1,253 ft)
- Lowest elevation: 296 m (971 ft)
- Population (2023): 189
  - Density: 97.4/km^{2} (252/sq mi)
- Time zone: UTC+01:00 (CET)
  - Summer (DST): UTC+02:00 (CEST)
- INSEE/Postal code: 65332 /65350
- ^{1} French Land Register data, which excludes lakes, ponds, glaciers > 1 km^{2} (0.386 sq mi or 247 acres) and river estuaries.

Oléac-Debat is a commune in the Hautes-Pyrénées department in south-western France.

== See also ==
- Communes of the Hautes-Pyrénées department
