= Hourc =

- Commune
- Coat of arms
- Location of Hourc
- Location within France Location within Occitanie
- Coordinates: 43°15′02″N 0°10′18″E
- Country: France
- Region: Occitania
- Department: Hautes-Pyrénées
- Arrondissement: Tarbes
- Canton: Les Coteaux
- Intercommunality: Coteaux du Val d'Arros

Government
  - Mayor (2023–2026): Didier Duthu
- Area^{1}: 2 km^{2} (0.77 sq mi)
- Elevation: 300 m (980 ft)
- Highest elevation: 406 m (1,332 ft)
- Lowest elevation: 266 m (873 ft)
- Population (2023): 109
  - Density: 54/km^{2} (140/sq mi)
- Time zone: UTC+01:00 (CET)
  - Summer (DST): UTC+02:00 (CEST)
- INSEE/Postal code: 65225 /65350
- ^{1} French Land Register data, which excludes lakes, ponds, glaciers > 1 km^{2} (0.386 sq mi or 247 acres) and river estuaries.

Hourc is a commune in the Hautes-Pyrénées department in south-western France.

== See also ==
- Communes of the Hautes-Pyrénées department
