= Villemur =

- Commune
- Coat of arms
- Location of Villemur
- Location within France Location within Occitanie
- Coordinates: 43°15′20″N 0°33′01″E
- Country: France
- Region: Occitania
- Department: Hautes-Pyrénées
- Arrondissement: Tarbes
- Canton: Les Coteaux
- Intercommunality: Pays de Trie et du Magnoac

Government
  - Mayor (2020–2026): Jean-Paul Lapeyre
- Area^{1}: 3.71 km^{2} (1.43 sq mi)
- Elevation: 350 m (1,150 ft)
- Highest elevation: 476 m (1,562 ft)
- Lowest elevation: 305 m (1,001 ft)
- Population (2023): 67
  - Density: 18/km^{2} (47/sq mi)
- Time zone: UTC+01:00 (CET)
  - Summer (DST): UTC+02:00 (CEST)
- INSEE/Postal code: 65475 /65230
- ^{1} French Land Register data, which excludes lakes, ponds, glaciers > 1 km^{2} (0.386 sq mi or 247 acres) and river estuaries.

Villemur (French pronunciation: [vilmyʁ]; Occitan: Jalamur) is a commune in the Hautes-Pyrénées department in south-western France.

== See also ==
- Communes of the Hautes-Pyrénées department
