= Dours =

- Commune
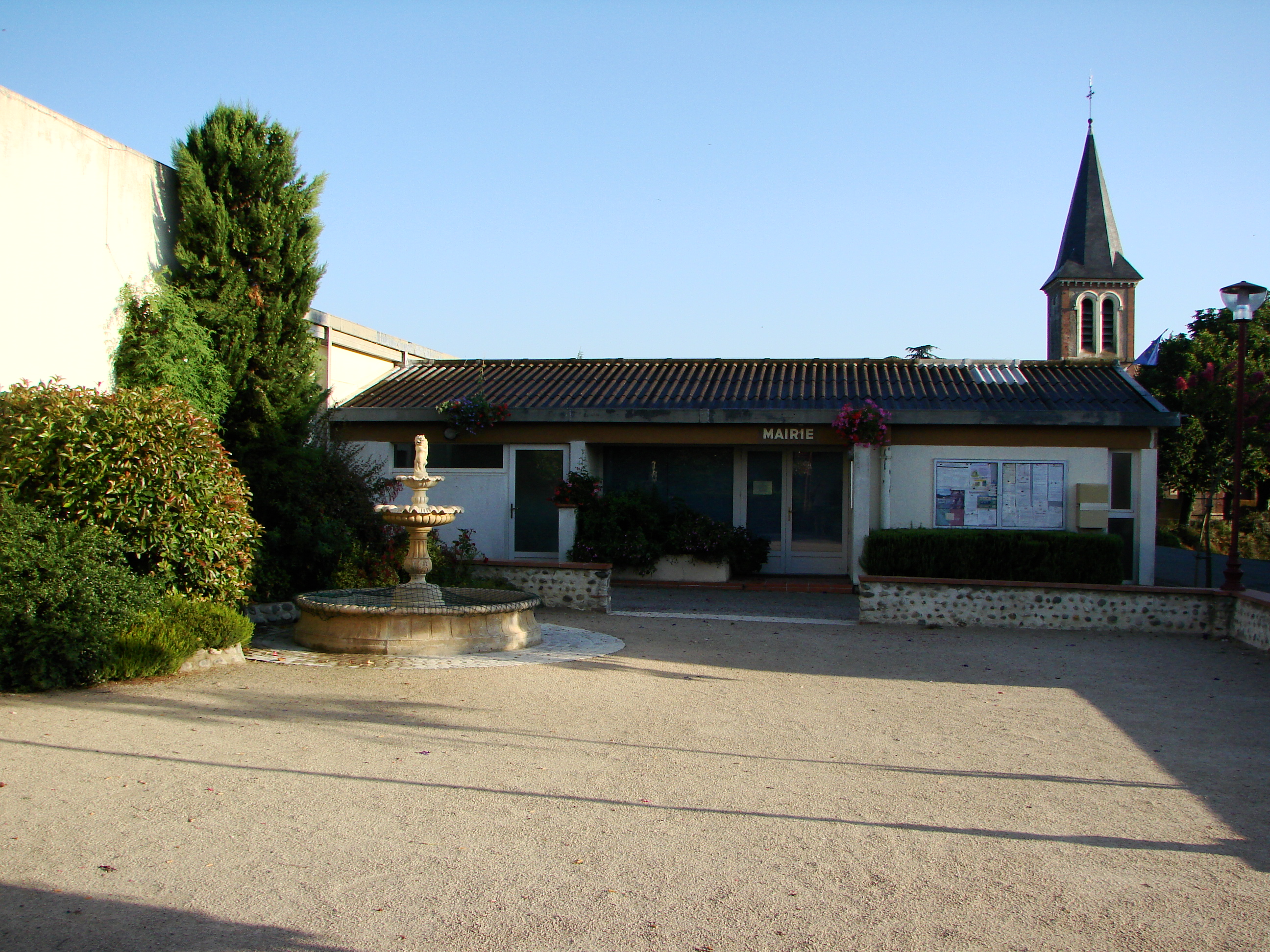
- Town Hall Square, hall (left) and church (background)

- Coat of arms
- Location of Dours
- Location within France Location within Occitanie
- Coordinates: 43°17′48″N 0°08′21″E
- Country: France
- Region: Occitania
- Department: Hautes-Pyrénées
- Arrondissement: Tarbes
- Canton: Les Coteaux
- Intercommunality: Coteaux du Val-d'Arros

Government
  - Mayor (2020–2026): Christophe Lassime
- Area^{1}: 4.99 km^{2} (1.93 sq mi)
- Elevation: 390 m (1,280 ft)
- Highest elevation: 343 m (1,125 ft)
- Lowest elevation: 244 m (801 ft)
- Population (2023): 225
  - Density: 45.1/km^{2} (117/sq mi)
- Time zone: UTC+01:00 (CET)
  - Summer (DST): UTC+02:00 (CEST)
- INSEE/Postal code: 65156 /65350
- ^{1} French Land Register data, which excludes lakes, ponds, glaciers > 1 km^{2} (0.386 sq mi or 247 acres) and river estuaries.

Dours is a commune in the Hautes-Pyrénées department in south-western France.

== See also ==
- Communes of the Hautes-Pyrénées department
