= Thermes-Magnoac =

- Commune
- Coat of arms
- Location of Thermes-Magnoac
- Location within France Location within Occitanie
- Coordinates: 43°18′00″N 0°35′36″E
- Country: France
- Region: Occitania
- Department: Hautes-Pyrénées
- Arrondissement: Tarbes
- Canton: Les Coteaux
- Intercommunality: Pays de Trie et du Magnoac

Government
  - Mayor (2020–2026): Jean-Michel Laberenne
- Area^{1}: 10.83 km^{2} (4.18 sq mi)
- Elevation: 412 m (1,352 ft)
- Highest elevation: 416 m (1,365 ft)
- Lowest elevation: 266 m (873 ft)
- Population (2023): 240
  - Density: 22/km^{2} (57/sq mi)
- Time zone: UTC+01:00 (CET)
  - Summer (DST): UTC+02:00 (CEST)
- INSEE/Postal code: 65442 /65230
- ^{1} French Land Register data, which excludes lakes, ponds, glaciers > 1 km^{2} (0.386 sq mi or 247 acres) and river estuaries.

Thermes-Magnoac (French pronunciation: [tɛʁm maɲɔak]; Occitan: Tèrmes) is a commune in the Hautes-Pyrénées département in south-western France.

== See also ==
- Communes of the Hautes-Pyrénées department
