= Marseillan, Hautes-Pyrénées =

Marseillan
- Commune
- Coat of arms
- Location of Marseillan
- Location within France Location within Occitanie
- Coordinates: 43°18′23″N 0°12′59″E
- Country: France
- Region: Occitania
- Department: Hautes-Pyrénées
- Arrondissement: Tarbes
- Canton: Les Coteaux
- Intercommunality: Coteaux du Val d'Arros

Government
  - Mayor (2020–2026): Claude Cazanave
- Area^{1}: 4.4 km^{2} (1.7 sq mi)
- Elevation: 260 m (850 ft)
- Highest elevation: 322 m (1,056 ft)
- Lowest elevation: 194 m (636 ft)
- Population (2023): 269
  - Density: 61/km^{2} (160/sq mi)
- Time zone: UTC+01:00 (CET)
  - Summer (DST): UTC+02:00 (CEST)
- INSEE/Postal code: 65301 /65350
- ^{1} French Land Register data, which excludes lakes, ponds, glaciers > 1 km^{2} (0.386 sq mi or 247 acres) and river estuaries.

Marseillan (French pronunciation: [maʁsɛjɑ̃]; Occitan: Marcelhan) is a commune in the Hautes-Pyrénées department in south-western France.

== See also ==
- Communes of the Hautes-Pyrénées department
