= Betpouy =

- Commune
- Location of Betpouy
- Location within France Location within Occitanie
- Coordinates: 43°16′34″N 0°27′35″E
- Country: France
- Region: Occitania
- Department: Hautes-Pyrénées
- Arrondissement: Tarbes
- Canton: Les Coteaux
- Intercommunality: Pays de Trie et Magnoac

Government
  - Mayor (2020–2026): Jean-Marc Verdier
- Area^{1}: 4.15 km^{2} (1.60 sq mi)
- Elevation: 360 m (1,180 ft)
- Highest elevation: 456 m (1,496 ft)
- Lowest elevation: 287 m (942 ft)
- Population (2023): 72
  - Density: 17/km^{2} (45/sq mi)
- Time zone: UTC+01:00 (CET)
  - Summer (DST): UTC+02:00 (CEST)
- INSEE/Postal code: 65090 /65230
- ^{1} French Land Register data, which excludes lakes, ponds, glaciers > 1 km^{2} (0.386 sq mi or 247 acres) and river estuaries.

Betpouy (French pronunciation: [bɛtpwi]; Occitan: Bèthpoi) is a commune in the Hautes-Pyrénées department in southwestern France.

== Population ==
Historical population
Year	Pop.	±% p.a.
1968	69	—
1975	65	−0.85%
1982	68	+0.65%
1990	81	+2.21%
1999	72	−1.30%
2007	74	+0.34%
2012	79	+1.32%
2017	78	−0.25%
2023	72	−1.33%
Source: INSEE

== See also ==
- Communes of the Hautes-Pyrénées department
