= Peyret-Saint-André =

- Commune
- Coat of arms
- Location of Peyret-Saint-André
- Location within France Location within Occitanie
- Coordinates: 43°19′14″N 0°30′32″E
- Country: France
- Region: Occitania
- Department: Hautes-Pyrénées
- Arrondissement: Tarbes
- Canton: Les Coteaux
- Intercommunality: Pays de Trie et du Magnoac

Government
  - Mayor (2020–2026): Pierre Labat
- Area^{1}: 6.25 km^{2} (2.41 sq mi)
- Elevation: 340 m (1,120 ft)
- Highest elevation: 392 m (1,286 ft)
- Lowest elevation: 253 m (830 ft)
- Population (2023): 69
  - Density: 11/km^{2} (29/sq mi)
- Time zone: UTC+01:00 (CET)
  - Summer (DST): UTC+02:00 (CEST)
- INSEE/Postal code: 65358 /65230
- ^{1} French Land Register data, which excludes lakes, ponds, glaciers > 1 km^{2} (0.386 sq mi or 247 acres) and river estuaries.

Peyret-Saint-André (French pronunciation: [peʁɛ sɛ̃.t‿ɑ̃dʁe]; Occitan: Peiret) is a commune in the Hautes-Pyrénées department in south-western France.

== See also ==
- Communes of the Hautes-Pyrénées department
