= Laran, Hautes-Pyrénées =

Laran
- Commune
- Coat of arms
- Location of Laran
- Location within France Location within Occitanie
- Coordinates: 43°14′07″N 0°28′57″E
- Country: France
- Region: Occitania
- Department: Hautes-Pyrénées
- Arrondissement: Tarbes
- Canton: Les Coteaux
- Intercommunality: Pays de Trie et du Magnoac

Government
  - Mayor (2020–2026): Jean-Luc Gales
- Area^{1}: 3.44 km^{2} (1.33 sq mi)
- Elevation: 341 m (1,119 ft)
- Highest elevation: 486 m (1,594 ft)
- Lowest elevation: 324 m (1,063 ft)
- Population (2023): 46
  - Density: 13/km^{2} (35/sq mi)
- Time zone: UTC+01:00 (CET)
  - Summer (DST): UTC+02:00 (CEST)
- INSEE/Postal code: 65261 /65670
- ^{1} French Land Register data, which excludes lakes, ponds, glaciers > 1 km^{2} (0.386 sq mi or 247 acres) and river estuaries.

Laran (French pronunciation: [laʁɑ̃]) is a commune in the Hautes-Pyrénées department in south-western France.

== See also ==
- Communes of the Hautes-Pyrénées department
