= Pouy, Hautes-Pyrénées =

Pouy
- Commune
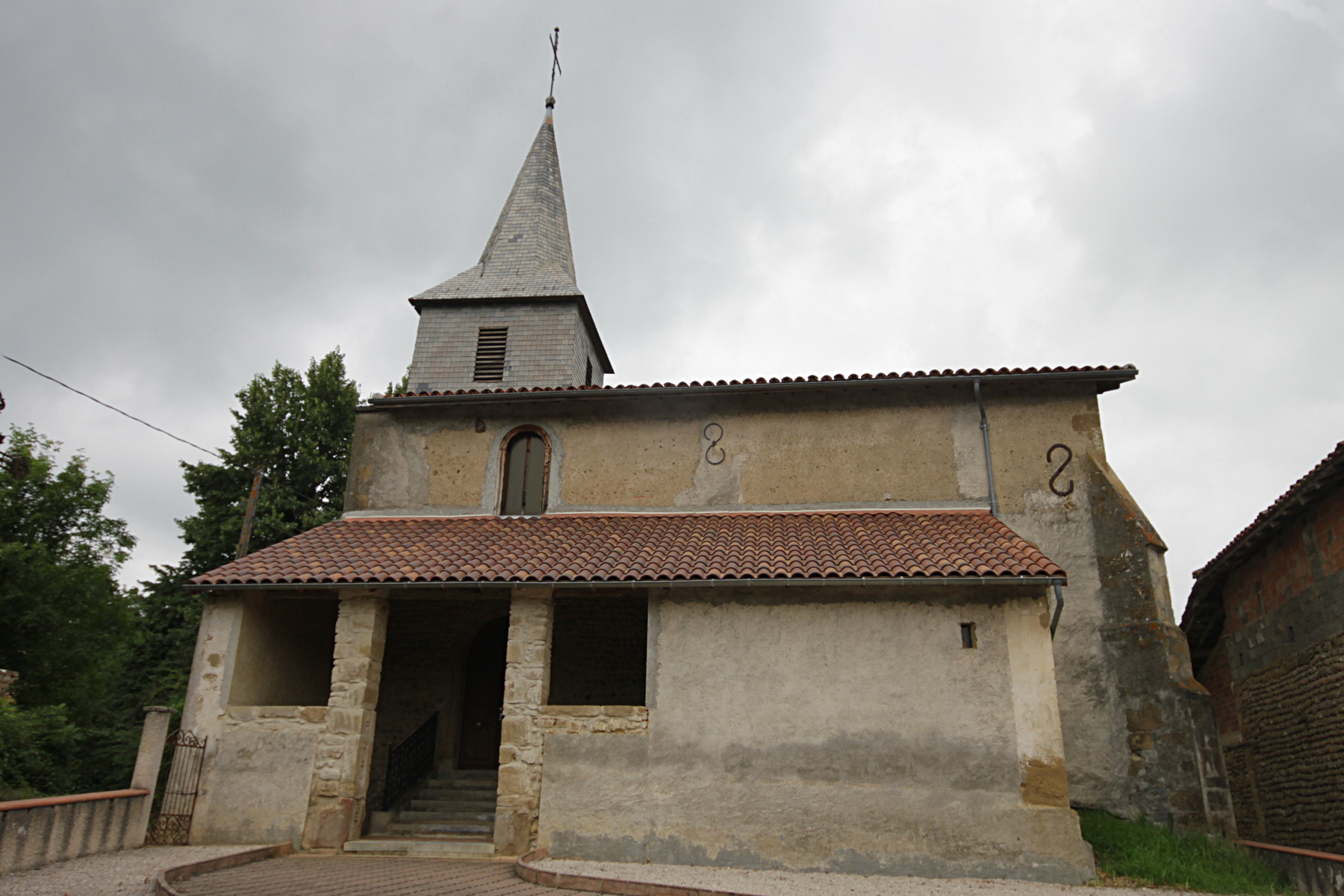
- The church of Pouy

- Coat of arms
- Location of Pouy
- Location within France Location within Occitanie
- Coordinates: 43°15′44″N 0°33′26″E
- Country: France
- Region: Occitania
- Department: Hautes-Pyrénées
- Arrondissement: Tarbes
- Canton: Les Coteaux
- Intercommunality: Pays de Trie et du Magnoac

Government
  - Mayor (2020–2026): Jean Lurde
- Area^{1}: 1.92 km^{2} (0.74 sq mi)
- Elevation: 320 m (1,050 ft)
- Highest elevation: 411 m (1,348 ft)
- Lowest elevation: 294 m (965 ft)
- Population (2023): 40
  - Density: 21/km^{2} (54/sq mi)
- Time zone: UTC+01:00 (CET)
  - Summer (DST): UTC+02:00 (CEST)
- INSEE/Postal code: 65368 /65230
- ^{1} French Land Register data, which excludes lakes, ponds, glaciers > 1 km^{2} (0.386 sq mi or 247 acres) and river estuaries.

Pouy (French pronunciation: [pwi]; Occitan: Eth Poi) is a commune in the Hautes-Pyrénées department in south-western France. This village covers an area of about 1.92 square kilometers, set at elevations between 294 and 411 meters. As of 2023, the population of the commune was 40.

== See also ==
- Communes of the Hautes-Pyrénées department
