= Bugard =

- Commune
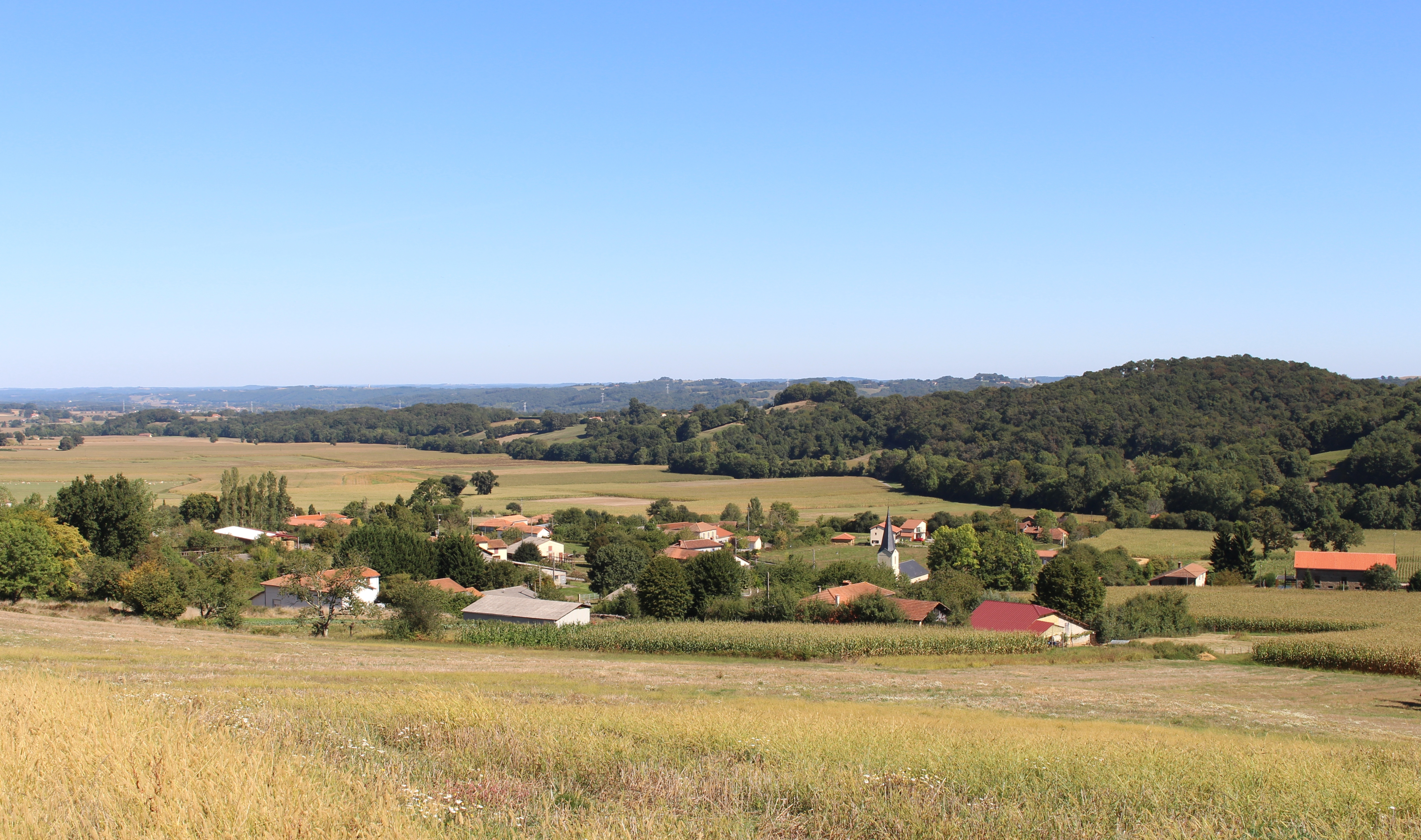
- View of Bugard

- Coat of arms
- Location of Bugard
- Location within France Location within Occitanie
- Coordinates: 43°15′32″N 0°18′53″E
- Country: France
- Region: Occitania
- Department: Hautes-Pyrénées
- Arrondissement: Tarbes
- Canton: Les Coteaux
- Area^{1}: 5.32 km^{2} (2.05 sq mi)
- Elevation: 420 m (1,380 ft)
- Highest elevation: 458 m (1,503 ft)
- Lowest elevation: 318 m (1,043 ft)
- Population (2023): 93
  - Density: 17/km^{2} (45/sq mi)
- Time zone: UTC+01:00 (CET)
  - Summer (DST): UTC+02:00 (CEST)
- INSEE/Postal code: 65110 /65220
- ^{1} French Land Register data, which excludes lakes, ponds, glaciers > 1 km^{2} (0.386 sq mi or 247 acres) and river estuaries.

Bugard (French pronunciation: [byɡaʁ]; Occitan: Bugar) is a commune in the Hautes-Pyrénées department in southwestern France.

== Population ==
Historical population
| Year | Pop. | ±% p.a. |
|---|---|---|
| 1968 | 111 | — |
| 1975 | 100 | −1.48% |
| 1982 | 95 | −0.73% |
| 1990 | 93 | −0.27% |
| 1999 | 99 | +0.70% |
| 2007 | 85 | −1.89% |
| 2012 | 87 | +0.47% |
| 2017 | 89 | +0.46% |
| 2023 | 93 | +0.74% |
Source: INSEE

== See also ==
- Communes of the Hautes-Pyrénées department
