= Marquerie =

- Commune
- Coat of arms
- Location of Marquerie
- Location within France Location within Occitanie
- Coordinates: 43°15′37″N 0°12′13″E
- Country: France
- Region: Occitania
- Department: Hautes-Pyrénées
- Arrondissement: Tarbes
- Canton: Les Coteaux
- Intercommunality: Coteaux du Val d'Arros

Government
  - Mayor (2020–2026): Paul Gaillat
- Area^{1}: 3.46 km^{2} (1.34 sq mi)
- Elevation: 430 m (1,410 ft)
- Highest elevation: 337 m (1,106 ft)
- Lowest elevation: 222 m (728 ft)
- Population (2023): 82
  - Density: 24/km^{2} (61/sq mi)
- Time zone: UTC+01:00 (CET)
  - Summer (DST): UTC+02:00 (CEST)
- INSEE/Postal code: 65298 /65350
- ^{1} French Land Register data, which excludes lakes, ponds, glaciers > 1 km^{2} (0.386 sq mi or 247 acres) and river estuaries.

Marquerie (French pronunciation: [maʁkəʁi]; Occitan: Marqueria) is a commune in the Hautes-Pyrénées department in south-western France.

== See also ==
- Communes of the Hautes-Pyrénées department
