= Gaussan =

- Commune
- Coat of arms
- Location of Gaussan
- Location within France Location within Occitanie
- Coordinates: 43°13′52″N 0°29′10″E
- Country: France
- Region: Occitania
- Department: Hautes-Pyrénées
- Arrondissement: Tarbes
- Canton: Les Coteaux
- Intercommunality: Pays de Trie et du Magnoac

Government
  - Mayor (2020–2026): Francis Castet
- Area^{1}: 7.72 km^{2} (2.98 sq mi)
- Elevation: 325 m (1,066 ft)
- Highest elevation: 489 m (1,604 ft)
- Lowest elevation: 329 m (1,079 ft)
- Population (2023): 99
  - Density: 13/km^{2} (33/sq mi)
- Time zone: UTC+01:00 (CET)
  - Summer (DST): UTC+02:00 (CEST)
- INSEE/Postal code: 65187 /65670
- ^{1} French Land Register data, which excludes lakes, ponds, glaciers > 1 km^{2} (0.386 sq mi or 247 acres) and river estuaries.

Gaussan (French pronunciation: [ɡosɑ̃]) is a commune in the Hautes-Pyrénées department in south-western France.

== See also ==
- Communes of the Hautes-Pyrénées department
