= Lubret-Saint-Luc =

- Commune
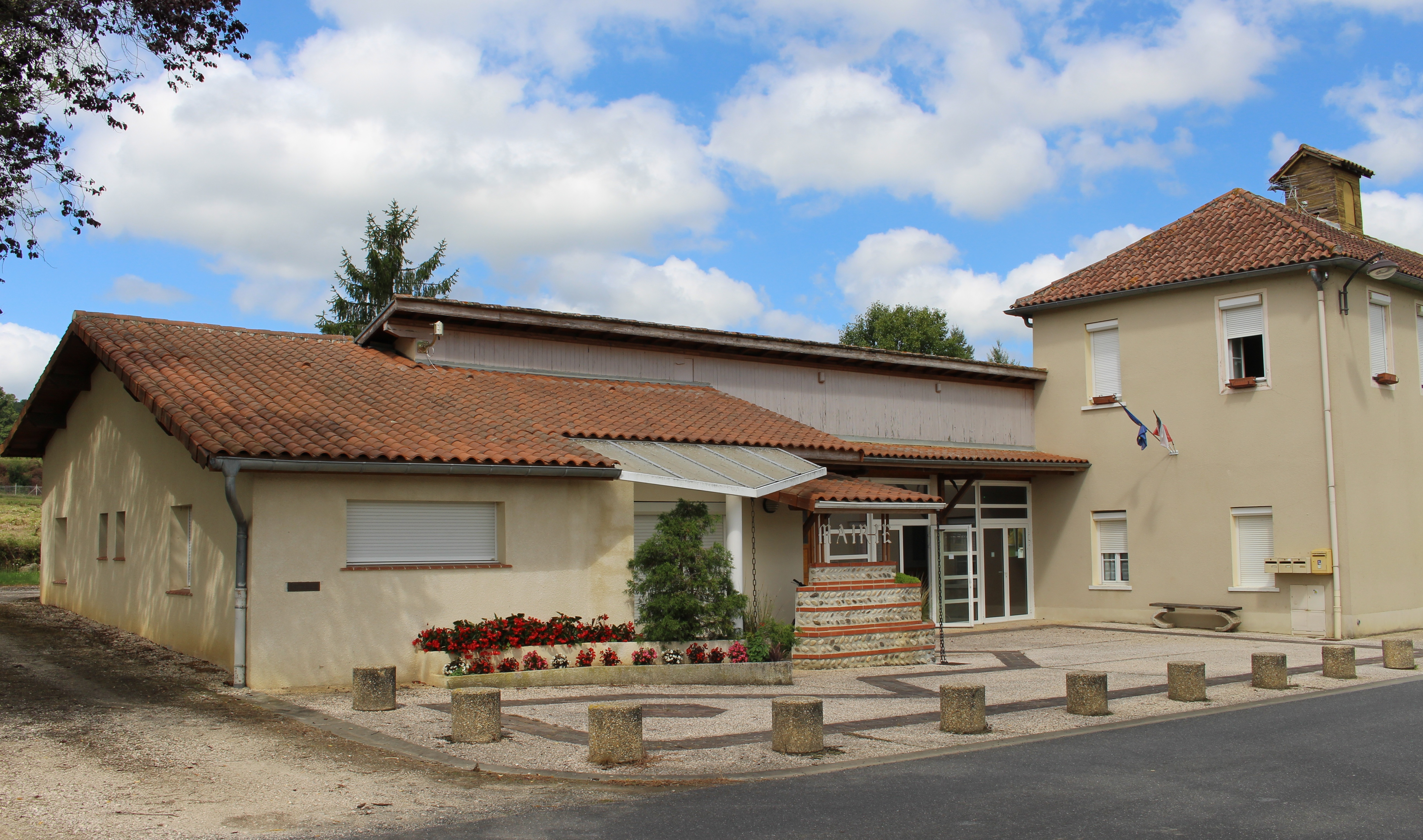
- Town hall

- Coat of arms
- Location of Lubret-Saint-Luc
- Location within France Location within Occitanie
- Coordinates: 43°18′58″N 0°18′10″E
- Country: France
- Region: Occitania
- Department: Hautes-Pyrénées
- Arrondissement: Tarbes
- Canton: Les Coteaux
- Intercommunality: Pays de Trie et Magnoac
- Area^{1}: 5.61 km^{2} (2.17 sq mi)
- Elevation: 309 m (1,014 ft)
- Highest elevation: 416 m (1,365 ft)
- Lowest elevation: 264 m (866 ft)
- Population (2023): 61
  - Density: 11/km^{2} (28/sq mi)
- Time zone: UTC+01:00 (CET)
  - Summer (DST): UTC+02:00 (CEST)
- INSEE/Postal code: 65288 /65220
- ^{1} French Land Register data, which excludes lakes, ponds, glaciers > 1 km^{2} (0.386 sq mi or 247 acres) and river estuaries.

Lubret-Saint-Luc (Gascon: Lubret e Sent Luc) is a commune in the Hautes-Pyrénées department in south-western France.

== See also ==
- Communes of the Hautes-Pyrénées department
