= Sabalos =

- Commune
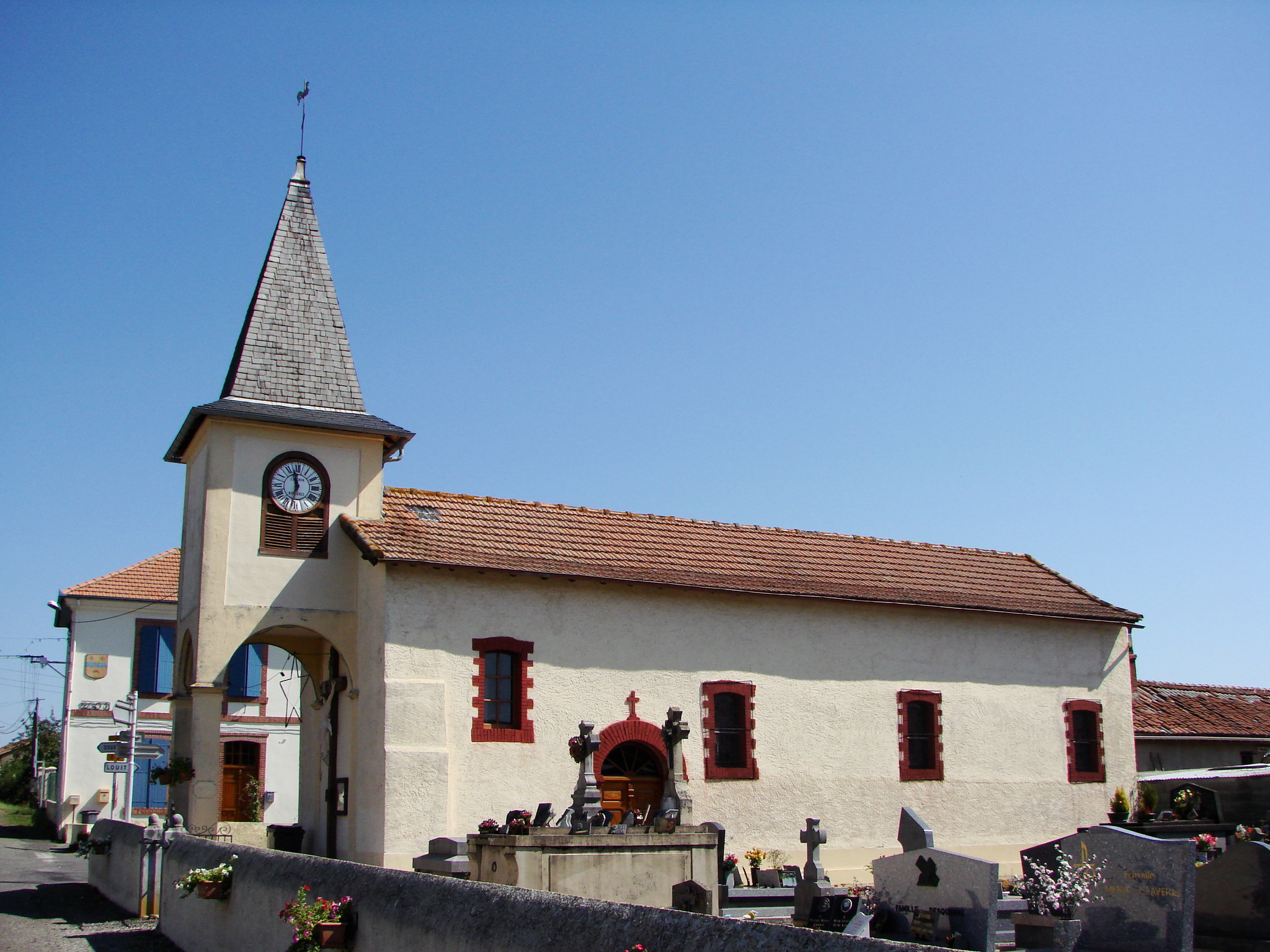
- Church with the town hall in the background

- Coat of arms
- Location of Sabalos
- Location within France Location within Occitanie
- Coordinates: 43°17′11″N 0°08′25″E
- Country: France
- Region: Occitania
- Department: Hautes-Pyrénées
- Arrondissement: Tarbes
- Canton: Les Coteaux
- Intercommunality: Coteaux du Val d'Arros

Government
  - Mayor (2020–2026): Didier Masset
- Area^{1}: 2.2 km^{2} (0.85 sq mi)
- Elevation: 390 m (1,280 ft)
- Highest elevation: 365 m (1,198 ft)
- Lowest elevation: 286 m (938 ft)
- Population (2023): 148
  - Density: 67/km^{2} (170/sq mi)
- Time zone: UTC+01:00 (CET)
  - Summer (DST): UTC+02:00 (CEST)
- INSEE/Postal code: 65380 /65350
- ^{1} French Land Register data, which excludes lakes, ponds, glaciers > 1 km^{2} (0.386 sq mi or 247 acres) and river estuaries.

Sabalos is a commune in the Hautes-Pyrénées department in south-western France.

== Population ==
Historical population
Year	Pop.	±% p.a.
1968	80	—
1975	72	−1.49%
1982	104	+5.39%
1990	119	+1.70%
1999	106	−1.28%
2007	137	+3.26%
2012	146	+1.28%
2017	147	+0.14%
2023	148	+0.11%
Source: INSEE

== See also ==
- Communes of the Hautes-Pyrénées department
