= Organ, Hautes-Pyrénées =

Organ
- Commune
- Coat of arms
- Location of Organ
- Location within France Location within Occitanie
- Coordinates: 43°16′34″N 0°29′04″E
- Country: France
- Region: Occitania
- Department: Hautes-Pyrénées
- Arrondissement: Tarbes
- Canton: Les Coteaux
- Intercommunality: Pays de Trie et du Magnoac

Government
  - Mayor (2020–2026): Alain Francingue
- Area^{1}: 2.73 km^{2} (1.05 sq mi)
- Elevation: 400 m (1,300 ft)
- Highest elevation: 440 m (1,440 ft)
- Lowest elevation: 310 m (1,020 ft)
- Population (2023): 27
  - Density: 9.9/km^{2} (26/sq mi)
- Time zone: UTC+01:00 (CET)
  - Summer (DST): UTC+02:00 (CEST)
- INSEE/Postal code: 65336 /65230
- ^{1} French Land Register data, which excludes lakes, ponds, glaciers > 1 km^{2} (0.386 sq mi or 247 acres) and river estuaries.

Organ (French pronunciation: [ɔʁɡɑ̃]) is a commune in the Hautes-Pyrénées department in south-western France.

== See also ==
- Communes of the Hautes-Pyrénées department
