= Coussan =

- Commune
- Coat of arms
- Location of Coussan
- Location within France Location within Occitanie
- Coordinates: 43°14′39″N 0°12′27″E
- Country: France
- Region: Occitania
- Department: Hautes-Pyrénées
- Arrondissement: Tarbes
- Canton: Les Coteaux
- Intercommunality: Coteaux du Val d'Arros

Government
  - Mayor (2020–2026): Félix Gabriel
- Area^{1}: 3.12 km^{2} (1.20 sq mi)
- Elevation: 300 m (980 ft)
- Highest elevation: 330 m (1,080 ft)
- Lowest elevation: 231 m (758 ft)
- Population (2023): 104
  - Density: 33.3/km^{2} (86.3/sq mi)
- Time zone: UTC+01:00 (CET)
  - Summer (DST): UTC+02:00 (CEST)
- INSEE/Postal code: 65153 /65350
- ^{1} French Land Register data, which excludes lakes, ponds, glaciers > 1 km^{2} (0.386 sq mi or 247 acres) and river estuaries.

Coussan (French pronunciation: [kusɑ̃]; Occitan: Coçan) is a commune in the Hautes-Pyrénées department in south-western France.

== See also ==
- Communes of the Hautes-Pyrénées department
