= Cizos =

- Commune
- Coat of arms
- Location of Cizos
- Location within France Location within Occitanie
- Coordinates: 43°15′41″N 0°29′27″E
- Country: France
- Region: Occitania
- Department: Hautes-Pyrénées
- Arrondissement: Tarbes
- Canton: Les Coteaux
- Intercommunality: Pays de Trie et du Magnoac

Government
  - Mayor (2023–2026): Max Castets
- Area^{1}: 7.61 km^{2} (2.94 sq mi)
- Elevation: 380 m (1,250 ft)
- Highest elevation: 462 m (1,516 ft)
- Lowest elevation: 301 m (988 ft)
- Population (2023): 136
  - Density: 17.9/km^{2} (46.3/sq mi)
- Time zone: UTC+01:00 (CET)
  - Summer (DST): UTC+02:00 (CEST)
- INSEE/Postal code: 65148 /65230
- ^{1} French Land Register data, which excludes lakes, ponds, glaciers > 1 km^{2} (0.386 sq mi or 247 acres) and river estuaries.

Cizos is a commune in the Hautes-Pyrénées department in south-western France.

== See also ==
- Communes of the Hautes-Pyrénées department
