= Caubous, Hautes-Pyrénées =

Caubous
- Commune
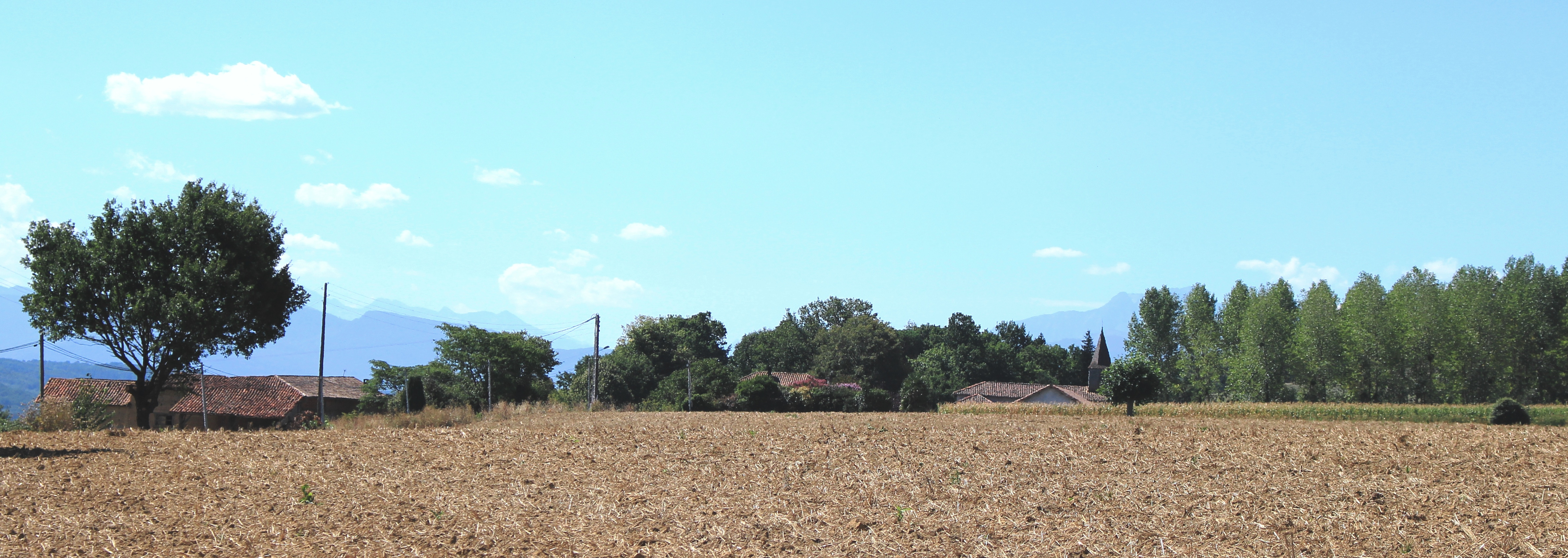
- View of Caubous

- Coat of arms
- Location of Caubous
- Location within France Location within Occitanie
- Coordinates: 43°14′47″N 0°28′46″E
- Country: France
- Region: Occitania
- Department: Hautes-Pyrénées
- Arrondissement: Tarbes
- Canton: Les Coteaux
- Intercommunality: Pays de Trie et du Magnoac

Government
  - Mayor (2020–2026): Joël Aspect
- Area^{1}: 3.77 km^{2} (1.46 sq mi)
- Elevation: 375 m (1,230 ft)
- Highest elevation: 466 m (1,529 ft)
- Lowest elevation: 340 m (1,120 ft)
- Population (2023): 32
  - Density: 8.5/km^{2} (22/sq mi)
- Time zone: UTC+01:00 (CET)
  - Summer (DST): UTC+02:00 (CEST)
- INSEE/Postal code: 65136 /65230
- ^{1} French Land Register data, which excludes lakes, ponds, glaciers > 1 km^{2} (0.386 sq mi or 247 acres) and river estuaries.

Caubous (Occitan: Caubos) is a commune in the Hautes-Pyrénées department in south-western France.

== See also ==
- Communes of the Hautes-Pyrénées department
