= Lapeyre =

- Commune
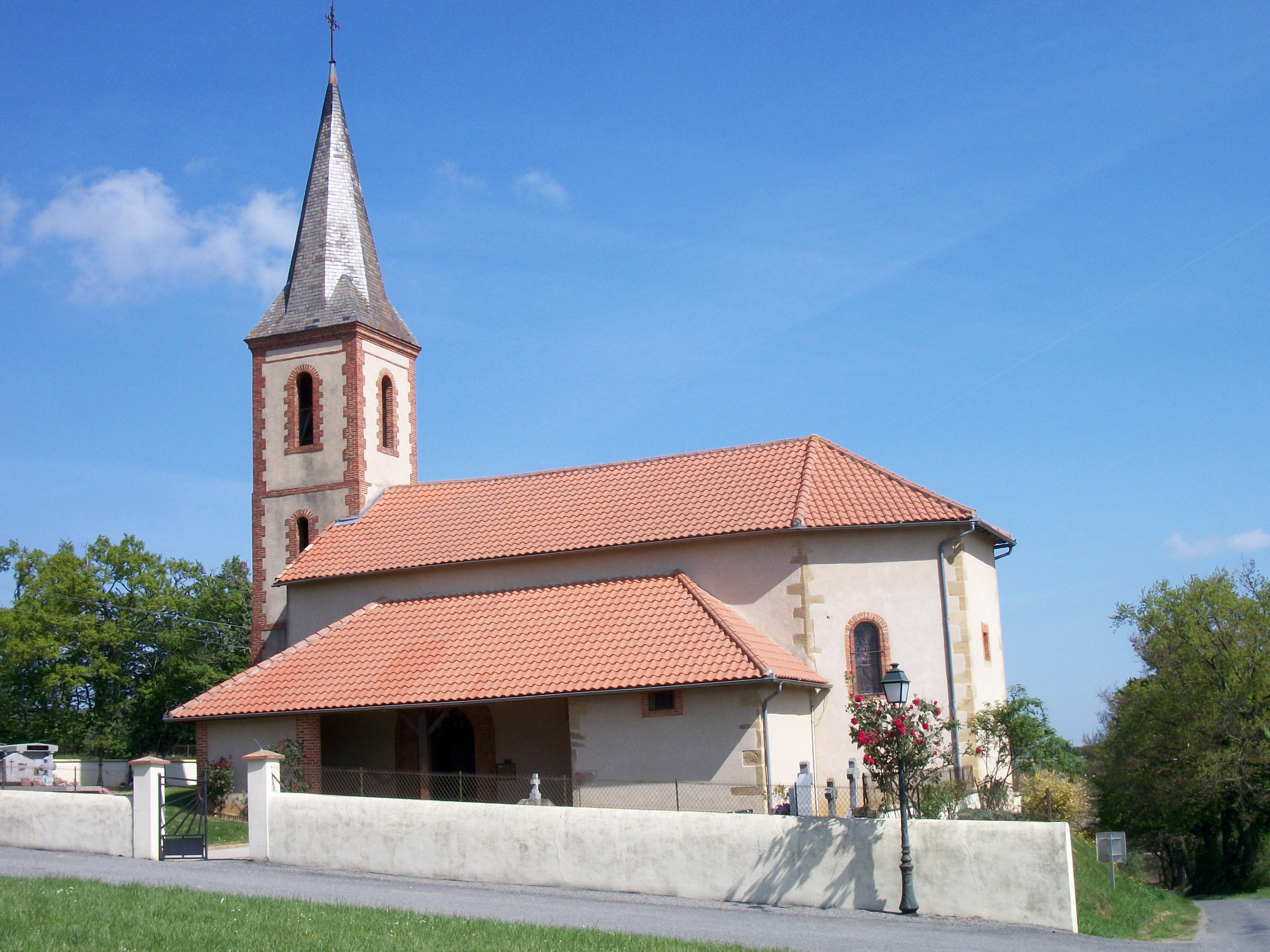
- The church

- Coat of arms
- Location of Lapeyre
- Location within France Location within Occitanie
- Coordinates: 43°19′27″N 0°20′23″E
- Country: France
- Region: Occitania
- Department: Hautes-Pyrénées
- Arrondissement: Tarbes
- Canton: Les Coteaux
- Intercommunality: Pays de Trie et Magnoac

Government
  - Mayor (2020–2026): Frédéric Gaye
- Area^{1}: 3.57 km^{2} (1.38 sq mi)
- Elevation: 326 m (1,070 ft)
- Highest elevation: 388 m (1,273 ft)
- Lowest elevation: 264 m (866 ft)
- Population (2023): 90
  - Density: 25/km^{2} (65/sq mi)
- Time zone: UTC+01:00 (CET)
  - Summer (DST): UTC+02:00 (CEST)
- INSEE/Postal code: 65260 /65220
- ^{1} French Land Register data, which excludes lakes, ponds, glaciers > 1 km^{2} (0.386 sq mi or 247 acres) and river estuaries.

Lapeyre (French pronunciation: [lapɛʁ]; Occitan: La Pèira) is a commune in the Hautes-Pyrénées department in south-western France.

== See also ==
- Communes of the Hautes-Pyrénées department
