= Puydarrieux =

- Commune
- Coat of arms
- Location of Puydarrieux
- Location within France Location within Occitanie
- Coordinates: 43°17′11″N 0°23′11″E
- Country: France
- Region: Occitania
- Department: Hautes-Pyrénées
- Arrondissement: Tarbes
- Canton: Les Coteaux
- Intercommunality: Pays de Trie et Magnoac

Government
  - Mayor (2020–2026): Jean-Louis Sorbet
- Area^{1}: 13.99 km^{2} (5.40 sq mi)
- Elevation: 310 m (1,020 ft)
- Highest elevation: 406 m (1,332 ft)
- Lowest elevation: 243 m (797 ft)
- Population (2023): 226
  - Density: 16.2/km^{2} (41.8/sq mi)
- Time zone: UTC+01:00 (CET)
  - Summer (DST): UTC+02:00 (CEST)
- INSEE/Postal code: 65374 /65220
- ^{1} French Land Register data, which excludes lakes, ponds, glaciers > 1 km^{2} (0.386 sq mi or 247 acres) and river estuaries.

Puydarrieux (French pronunciation: [pɥidaʁjø]; Occitan: Poidarrius) is a commune in the Hautes-Pyrénées department in south-western France.

== See also ==
- Communes of the Hautes-Pyrénées department
