= Aries-Espénan =

Arles-Espénan
- Commune
- Coat of arms
- Location of Arles-Espénan
- Location within France Location within Occitanie
- Coordinates: 43°16′41″N 0°31′53″E
- Country: France
- Region: Occitania
- Department: Hautes-Pyrénées
- Arrondissement: Tarbes
- Canton: Les Coteaux
- Intercommunality: Pays de Trie et du Magnoac

Government
  - Mayor (2020–2026): Isabelle Gandit
- Area^{1}: 5.55 km^{2} (2.14 sq mi)
- Elevation: 276 m (906 ft)
- Highest elevation: 405 m (1,329 ft)
- Lowest elevation: 262 m (860 ft)
- Population (2023): 91
  - Density: 16/km^{2} (42/sq mi)
- Time zone: UTC+01:00 (CET)
  - Summer (DST): UTC+02:00 (CEST)
- INSEE/Postal code: 65026 /65230
- ^{1} French Land Register data, which excludes lakes, ponds, glaciers > 1 km^{2} (0.386 sq mi or 247 acres) and river estuaries.

Arles-Espénan (French pronunciation: [aʁi ɛspenɑ̃]; Occitan: Arlés e Espenan) is a commune in the Hautes-Pyrénées department in southwestern France.

== Population ==
Historical population
Year	Pop.	±% p.a.
1968	83	—
1975	80	−0.52%
1982	75	−0.92%
1990	72	−0.51%
1999	63	−1.47%
2007	66	+0.58%
2012	62	−1.24%
2017	71	+2.75%
2023	91	+4.22%
Source: INSEE

== See also ==
- Communes of the Hautes-Pyrénées department
