= Villembits =

- Commune
- Coat of arms
- Location of Villembits
- Location within France Location within Occitanie
- Coordinates: 43°16′53″N 0°18′52″E
- Country: France
- Region: Occitania
- Department: Hautes-Pyrénées
- Arrondissement: Tarbes
- Canton: Les Coteaux
- Intercommunality: Pays de Trie et Magnoac

Government
  - Mayor (2024–2026): Thierry Dubie
- Area^{1}: 5.25 km^{2} (2.03 sq mi)
- Elevation: 300 m (980 ft)
- Highest elevation: 425 m (1,394 ft)
- Lowest elevation: 282 m (925 ft)
- Population (2023): 109
  - Density: 20.8/km^{2} (53.8/sq mi)
- Time zone: UTC+01:00 (CET)
  - Summer (DST): UTC+02:00 (CEST)
- INSEE/Postal code: 65474 /65220
- ^{1} French Land Register data, which excludes lakes, ponds, glaciers > 1 km^{2} (0.386 sq mi or 247 acres) and river estuaries.

Villembits is a commune in the Hautes-Pyrénées department in south-western France.

== See also ==
- Communes of the Hautes-Pyrénées department
