= Mun, Hautes-Pyrénées =

Mun
- Commune
- Coat of arms
- Location of Mun
- Location within France Location within Occitanie
- Coordinates: 43°17′06″N 0°16′15″E
- Country: France
- Region: Occitania
- Department: Hautes-Pyrénées
- Arrondissement: Tarbes
- Canton: Les Coteaux
- Intercommunality: Coteaux du Val d'Arros

Government
  - Mayor (2020–2026): Jean-Luc Sabathé
- Area^{1}: 4.81 km^{2} (1.86 sq mi)
- Elevation: 355 m (1,165 ft)
- Highest elevation: 434 m (1,424 ft)
- Lowest elevation: 250 m (820 ft)
- Population (2023): 74
  - Density: 15/km^{2} (40/sq mi)
- Time zone: UTC+01:00 (CET)
  - Summer (DST): UTC+02:00 (CEST)
- INSEE/Postal code: 65326 /65350
- ^{1} French Land Register data, which excludes lakes, ponds, glaciers > 1 km^{2} (0.386 sq mi or 247 acres) and river estuaries.

Mun (French pronunciation: [mœ̃]) is a commune in the Hautes-Pyrénées department in south-western France.

== See also ==
- Communes of the Hautes-Pyrénées department
