= Mazerolles, Hautes-Pyrénées =

Mazerolles
- Commune
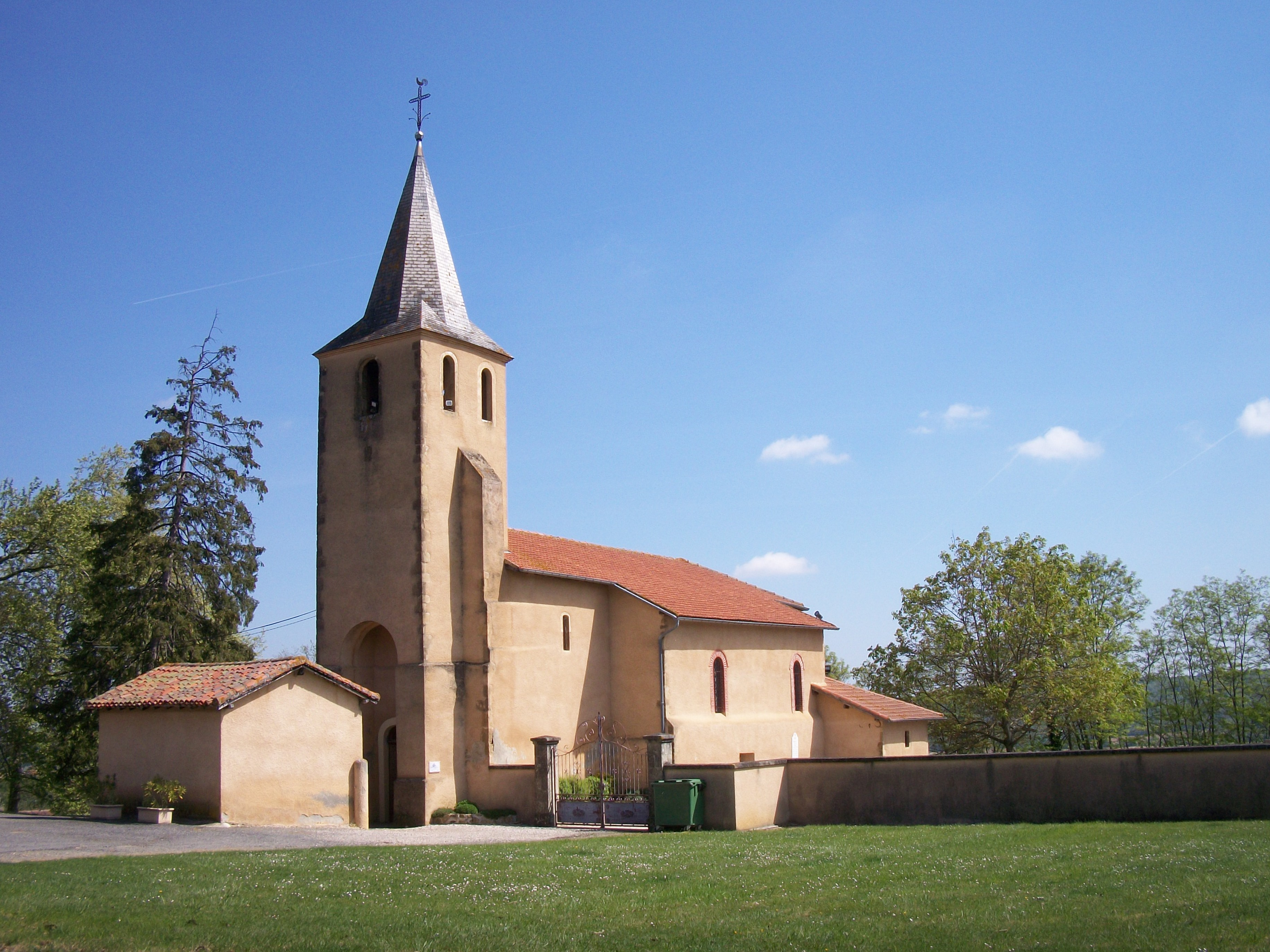
- The church of Mazerolles

- Coat of arms
- Location of Mazerolles
- Location within France Location within Occitanie
- Coordinates: 43°21′20″N 0°17′11″E
- Country: France
- Region: Occitania
- Department: Hautes-Pyrénées
- Arrondissement: Tarbes
- Canton: Les Coteaux
- Intercommunality: Pays de Trie et Magnoac

Government
  - Mayor (2020–2026): Monique Rossignol
- Area^{1}: 6.33 km^{2} (2.44 sq mi)
- Elevation: 340 m (1,120 ft)
- Highest elevation: 385 m (1,263 ft)
- Lowest elevation: 233 m (764 ft)
- Population (2023): 113
  - Density: 17.9/km^{2} (46.2/sq mi)
- Time zone: UTC+01:00 (CET)
  - Summer (DST): UTC+02:00 (CEST)
- INSEE/Postal code: 65308 /65220
- ^{1} French Land Register data, which excludes lakes, ponds, glaciers > 1 km^{2} (0.386 sq mi or 247 acres) and river estuaries.

Mazerolles (French pronunciation: [mazʁɔl]; Occitan: Maderòlas) is a commune in the Hautes-Pyrénées department in south-western France.

== See also ==
- Communes of the Hautes-Pyrénées department
