= Laslades =

- Commune
- Coat of arms
- Location of Laslades
- Location within France Location within Occitanie
- Coordinates: 43°13′45″N 0°10′08″E
- Country: France
- Region: Occitania
- Department: Hautes-Pyrénées
- Arrondissement: Tarbes
- Canton: Les Coteaux
- Intercommunality: Coteaux du Val d'Arros

Government
  - Mayor (2020–2026): Jacques Fourcade
- Area^{1}: 5.26 km^{2} (2.03 sq mi)
- Elevation: 352 m (1,155 ft)
- Highest elevation: 416 m (1,365 ft)
- Lowest elevation: 245 m (804 ft)
- Population (2023): 357
  - Density: 67.9/km^{2} (176/sq mi)
- Time zone: UTC+01:00 (CET)
  - Summer (DST): UTC+02:00 (CEST)
- INSEE/Postal code: 65265 /65350
- ^{1} French Land Register data, which excludes lakes, ponds, glaciers > 1 km^{2} (0.386 sq mi or 247 acres) and river estuaries.

Laslades (French pronunciation: [laslad]; Occitan: Lasladas) is a commune in the Hautes-Pyrénées department in south-western France.

== See also ==
- Communes of the Hautes-Pyrénées department
