= Cabanac =

- Commune
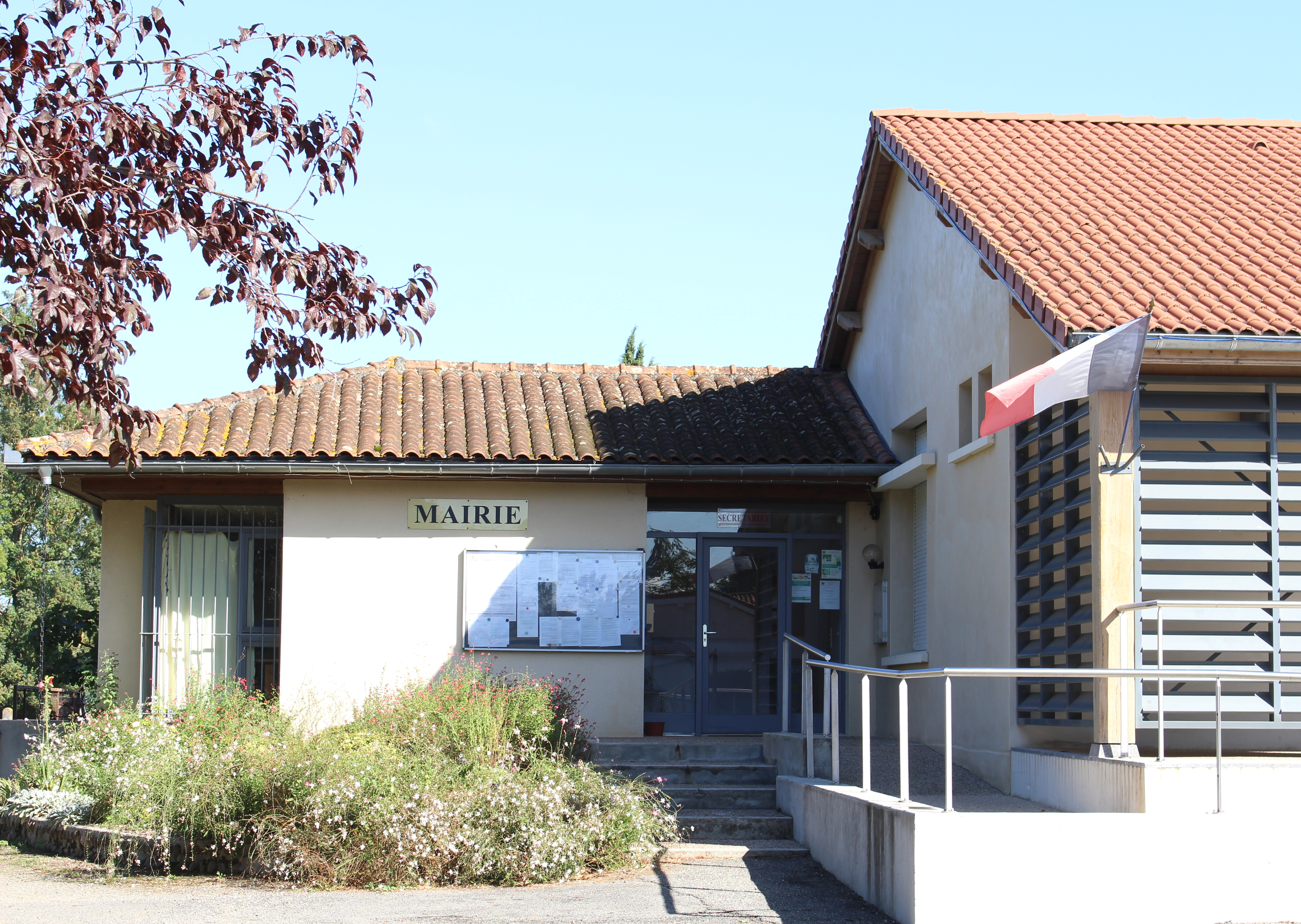
- Town hall of Cabanac

- Coat of arms
- Location of Cabanac
- Location within France Location within Occitanie
- Coordinates: 43°16′20″N 0°13′55″E
- Country: France
- Region: Occitania
- Department: Hautes-Pyrénées
- Arrondissement: Tarbes
- Canton: Les Coteaux
- Intercommunality: Coteaux du Val d'Arros

Government
  - Mayor (2020–2026): Jean-Michel Chevalier
- Area^{1}: 5.56 km^{2} (2.15 sq mi)
- Elevation: 220 m (720 ft)
- Highest elevation: 315 m (1,033 ft)
- Lowest elevation: 205 m (673 ft)
- Population (2023): 304
  - Density: 54.7/km^{2} (142/sq mi)
- Time zone: UTC+01:00 (CET)
  - Summer (DST): UTC+02:00 (CEST)
- INSEE/Postal code: 65115 /65350
- ^{1} French Land Register data, which excludes lakes, ponds, glaciers > 1 km^{2} (0.386 sq mi or 247 acres) and river estuaries.

Cabanac (French pronunciation: [kabanak]) is a commune in the Hautes-Pyrénées department in south-western France.

== Population ==
Historical population
Year	Pop.	±% p.a.
1968	211	—
1975	197	−0.98%
1982	217	+1.39%
1990	217	+0.00%
1999	210	−0.36%
2007	241	+1.74%
2012	294	+4.06%
2017	290	−0.27%
2023	304	+0.79%
Source: INSEE

== See also ==
- Communes of the Hautes-Pyrénées department
