= Peyriguère =

- Commune
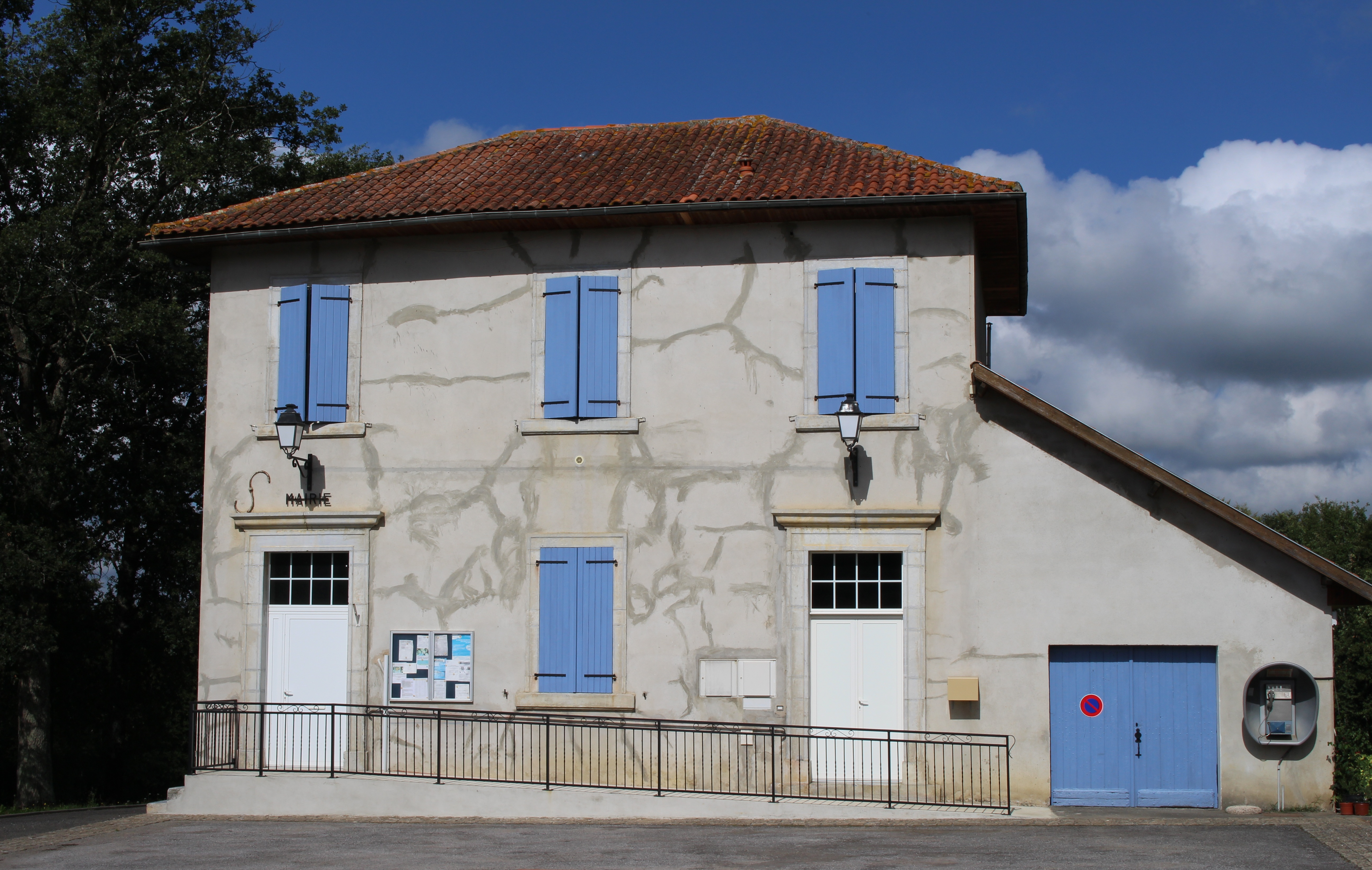
- Town hall

- Coat of arms
- Location of Peyriguère
- Location within France Location within Occitanie
- Coordinates: 43°15′20″N 0°15′45″E
- Country: France
- Region: Occitania
- Department: Hautes-Pyrénées
- Arrondissement: Tarbes
- Canton: Les Coteaux
- Intercommunality: Coteaux du Val d'Arros

Government
  - Mayor (2020–2026): Françoise Roy
- Area^{1}: 4.17 km^{2} (1.61 sq mi)
- Elevation: 430 m (1,410 ft)
- Highest elevation: 438 m (1,437 ft)
- Lowest elevation: 217 m (712 ft)
- Population (2023): 20
  - Density: 4.8/km^{2} (12/sq mi)
- Time zone: UTC+01:00 (CET)
  - Summer (DST): UTC+02:00 (CEST)
- INSEE/Postal code: 65359 /65350
- ^{1} French Land Register data, which excludes lakes, ponds, glaciers > 1 km^{2} (0.386 sq mi or 247 acres) and river estuaries.

Peyriguère (French pronunciation: [peʁiɡɛʁ]; Occitan: Peiriguèra) is a commune in the Hautes-Pyrénées department in south-western France.

== See also ==
- Communes of the Hautes-Pyrénées department
