= Vidou =

- Commune
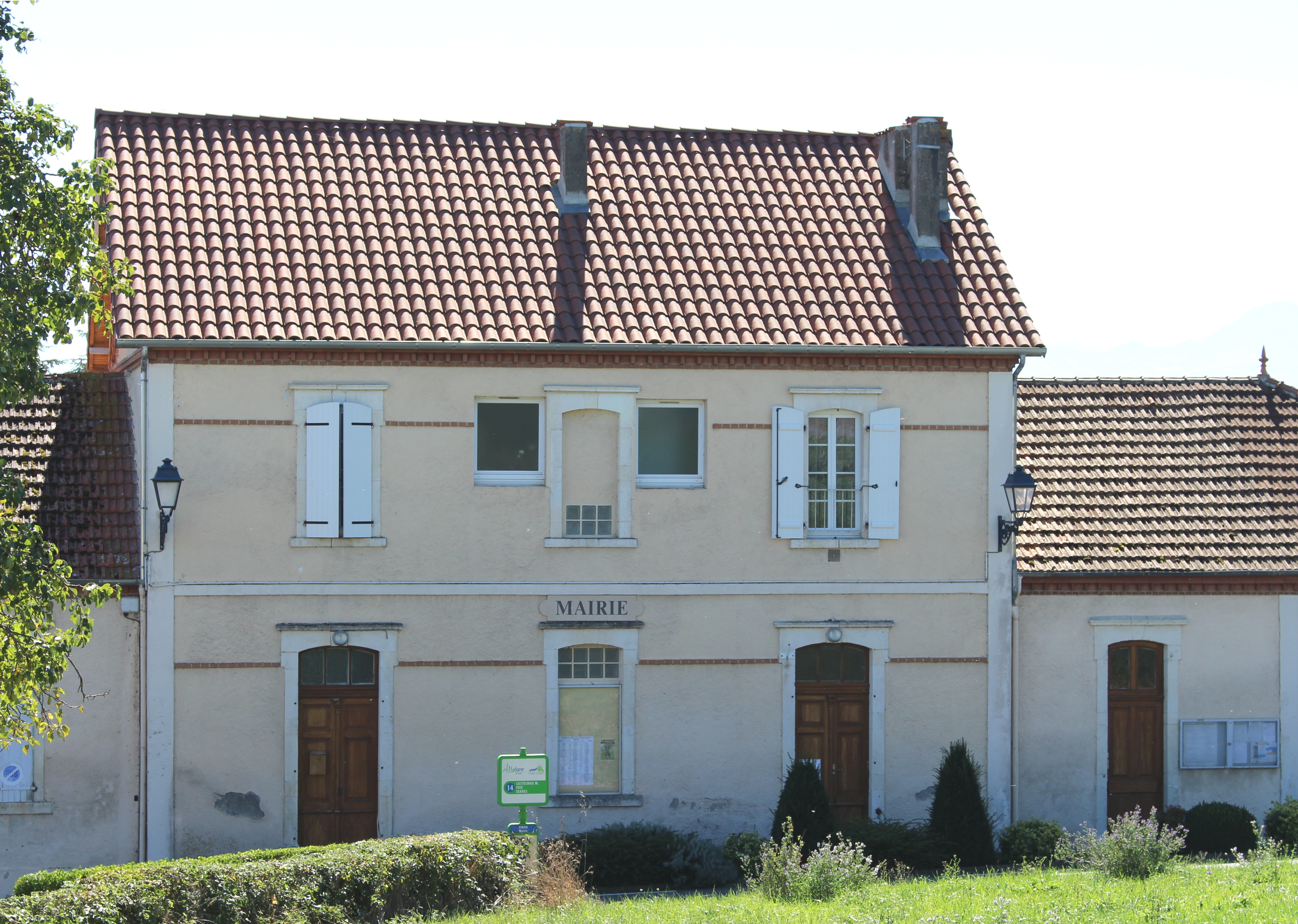
- Town hall

- Coat of arms
- Location of Vidou
- Location within France Location within Occitanie
- Coordinates: 43°17′59″N 0°19′28″E
- Country: France
- Region: Occitania
- Department: Hautes-Pyrénées
- Arrondissement: Tarbes
- Canton: Les Coteaux
- Intercommunality: Pays de Trie et Magnoac

Government
  - Mayor (2020–2026): Philippe Matha
- Area^{1}: 4.96 km^{2} (1.92 sq mi)
- Elevation: 300 m (980 ft)
- Highest elevation: 370 m (1,210 ft)
- Lowest elevation: 264 m (866 ft)
- Population (2023): 79
  - Density: 16/km^{2} (41/sq mi)
- Time zone: UTC+01:00 (CET)
  - Summer (DST): UTC+02:00 (CEST)
- INSEE/Postal code: 65461 /65220
- ^{1} French Land Register data, which excludes lakes, ponds, glaciers > 1 km^{2} (0.386 sq mi or 247 acres) and river estuaries.

Vidou (French pronunciation: [vidu]; Occitan: Vido) is a commune in the Hautes-Pyrénées department in south-western France.

== See also ==
- Communes of the Hautes-Pyrénées department
