= Lustar =

- Commune
- Coat of arms
- Location of Lustar
- Location within France Location within Occitanie
- Coordinates: 43°16′13″N 0°20′10″E
- Country: France
- Region: Occitania
- Department: Hautes-Pyrénées
- Arrondissement: Tarbes
- Canton: Les Coteaux
- Intercommunality: Pays de Trie et Magnoac
- Area^{1}: 4.91 km^{2} (1.90 sq mi)
- Elevation: 270 m (890 ft)
- Highest elevation: 410 m (1,350 ft)
- Lowest elevation: 270 m (890 ft)
- Population (2023): 95
  - Density: 19/km^{2} (50/sq mi)
- Time zone: UTC+01:00 (CET)
  - Summer (DST): UTC+02:00 (CEST)
- INSEE/Postal code: 65293 /65220
- ^{1} French Land Register data, which excludes lakes, ponds, glaciers > 1 km^{2} (0.386 sq mi or 247 acres) and river estuaries.

Lustar (French pronunciation: [lystaʁ]) is a commune in the Hautes-Pyrénées department in south-western France.

== See also ==
- Communes of the Hautes-Pyrénées department
