= Bouilh-Péreuilh =

- Commune
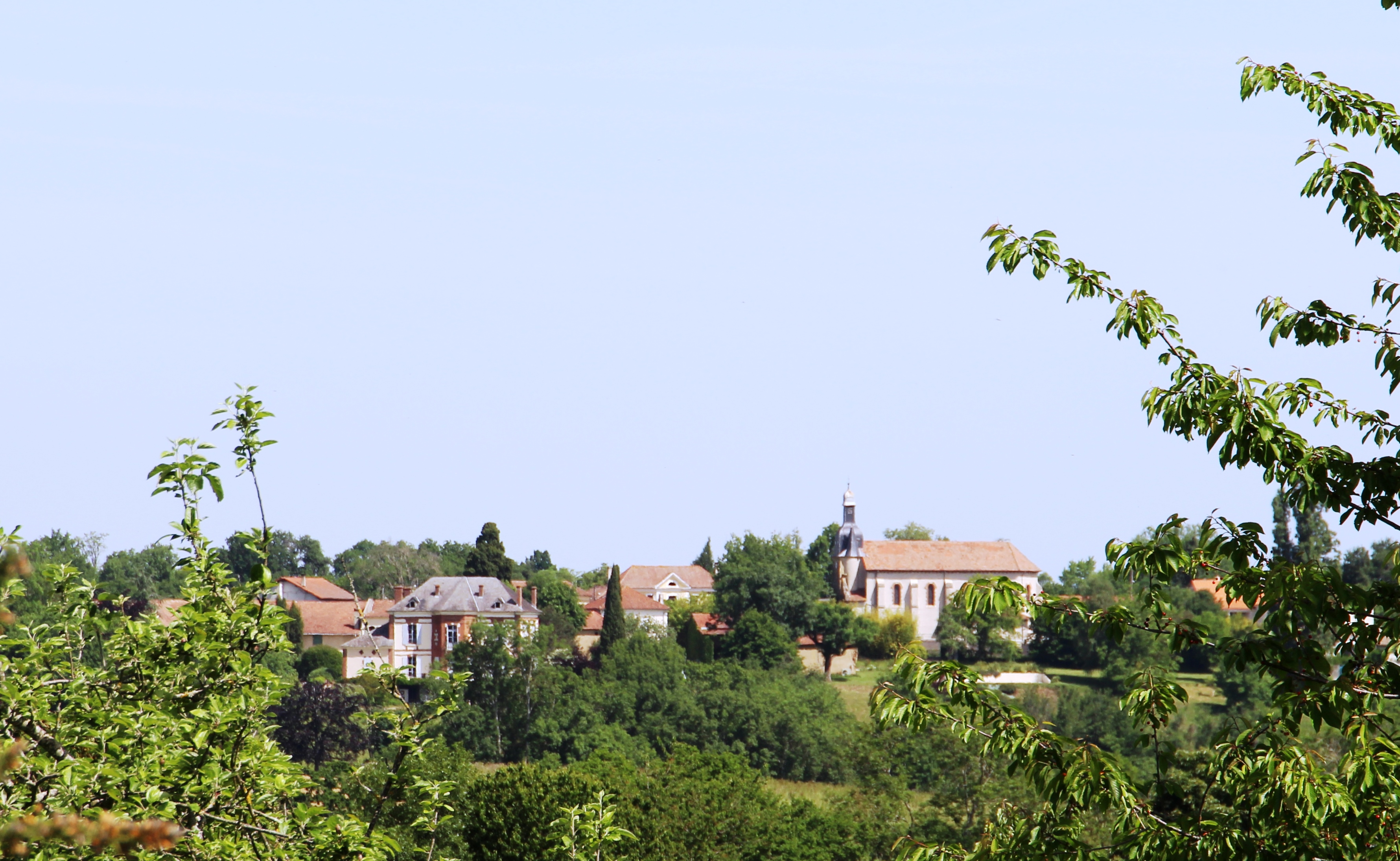
- View of Bouilh-Péreuilh
- Location of Bouilh-Péreuilh
- Location within France Location within Occitanie
- Coordinates: 43°18′28″N 0°11′18″E
- Country: France
- Region: Occitania
- Department: Hautes-Pyrénées
- Arrondissement: Tarbes
- Canton: Les Coteaux
- Intercommunality: Coteaux du Val d'Arros

Government
  - Mayor (2020–2026): Michel Iriarte
- Area^{1}: 7.85 km^{2} (3.03 sq mi)
- Elevation: 340 m (1,120 ft)
- Highest elevation: 351 m (1,152 ft)
- Lowest elevation: 219 m (719 ft)
- Population (2023): 130
  - Density: 17/km^{2} (43/sq mi)
- Time zone: UTC+01:00 (CET)
  - Summer (DST): UTC+02:00 (CEST)
- INSEE/Postal code: 65103 /65350
- ^{1} French Land Register data, which excludes lakes, ponds, glaciers > 1 km^{2} (0.386 sq mi or 247 acres) and river estuaries.

Bouilh-Péreuilh (French pronunciation: [buj peʁœj]; Occitan: Bolh Darrèr e Perulh) is a commune in the Hautes-Pyrénées department in southwestern France.

== Population ==
Historical population
Year	Pop.	±% p.a.
1968	84	—
1975	84	+0.00%
1982	93	+1.46%
1990	90	−0.41%
1999	88	−0.25%
2007	95	+0.96%
2012	98	+0.62%
2017	94	−0.83%
2023	130	+5.55%
Source: INSEE

== See also ==
- Communes of the Hautes-Pyrénées department
