= Lamarque-Rustaing =

- Commune
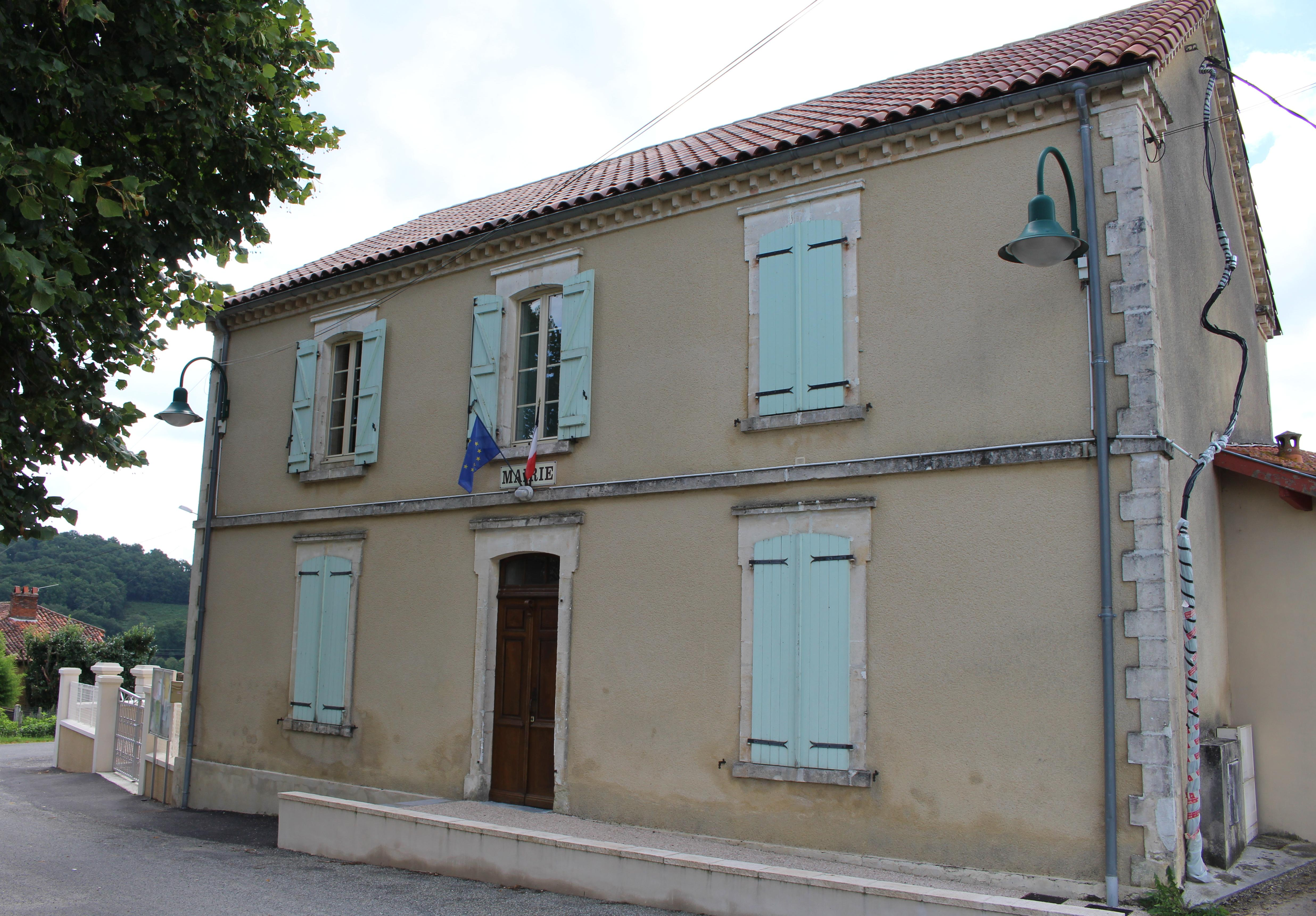
- Town hall

- Coat of arms
- Location of Lamarque-Rustaing
- Location within France Location within Occitanie
- Coordinates: 43°16′47″N 0°17′44″E
- Country: France
- Region: Occitania
- Department: Hautes-Pyrénées
- Arrondissement: Tarbes
- Canton: Les Coteaux
- Intercommunality: Pays de Trie et Magnoac

Government
  - Mayor (2020–2026): Christian Duprat
- Area^{1}: 2.79 km^{2} (1.08 sq mi)
- Elevation: 350 m (1,150 ft)
- Highest elevation: 421 m (1,381 ft)
- Lowest elevation: 287 m (942 ft)
- Population (2023): 54
  - Density: 19/km^{2} (50/sq mi)
- Time zone: UTC+01:00 (CET)
  - Summer (DST): UTC+02:00 (CEST)
- INSEE/Postal code: 65253 /65220
- ^{1} French Land Register data, which excludes lakes, ponds, glaciers > 1 km^{2} (0.386 sq mi or 247 acres) and river estuaries.

Lamarque-Rustaing (French pronunciation: [lamaʁk ʁystɛ̃]; Occitan: La Marca d'Arrostanh) is a commune in the Hautes-Pyrénées department in south-western France.

== See also ==
- Communes of the Hautes-Pyrénées department
