= Lalanne, Hautes-Pyrénées =

Lalanne
- Commune
- Coat of arms
- Location of Lalanne
- Location within France Location within Occitanie
- Coordinates: 43°16′07″N 0°34′38″E
- Country: France
- Region: Occitania
- Department: Hautes-Pyrénées
- Arrondissement: Tarbes
- Canton: Les Coteaux
- Intercommunality: Pays de Trie et du Magnoac

Government
  - Mayor (2020–2026): Pierre Luscan
- Area^{1}: 6.56 km^{2} (2.53 sq mi)
- Elevation: 340 m (1,120 ft)
- Highest elevation: 416 m (1,365 ft)
- Lowest elevation: 292 m (958 ft)
- Population (2023): 99
  - Density: 15/km^{2} (39/sq mi)
- Time zone: UTC+01:00 (CET)
  - Summer (DST): UTC+02:00 (CEST)
- INSEE/Postal code: 65249 /65230
- ^{1} French Land Register data, which excludes lakes, ponds, glaciers > 1 km^{2} (0.386 sq mi or 247 acres) and river estuaries.

Lalanne (French pronunciation: [lalan]; Occitan: La Lana) is a commune in the Hautes-Pyrénées department in south-western France.

== See also ==
- Communes of the Hautes-Pyrénées department
