= Lalanne-Trie =

- Commune
- Coat of arms
- Location of Lalanne-Trie
- Location within France Location within Occitanie
- Coordinates: 43°18′40″N 0°20′21″E
- Country: France
- Region: Occitania
- Department: Hautes-Pyrénées
- Arrondissement: Tarbes
- Canton: Les Coteaux
- Intercommunality: Pays de Trie et Magnoac

Government
  - Mayor (2020–2026): Olivier Giret
- Area^{1}: 4.92 km^{2} (1.90 sq mi)
- Elevation: 350 m (1,150 ft)
- Highest elevation: 372 m (1,220 ft)
- Lowest elevation: 250 m (820 ft)
- Population (2023): 118
  - Density: 24.0/km^{2} (62.1/sq mi)
- Time zone: UTC+01:00 (CET)
  - Summer (DST): UTC+02:00 (CEST)
- INSEE/Postal code: 65250 /65220
- ^{1} French Land Register data, which excludes lakes, ponds, glaciers > 1 km^{2} (0.386 sq mi or 247 acres) and river estuaries.

Lalanne-Trie (French pronunciation: [lalan tʁi]; Gascon: La Lana) is a commune in the Hautes-Pyrénées department in south-western France.

== See also ==
- Communes of the Hautes-Pyrénées department
