= Canton of Les Coteaux =

Coordinates: 43.32°N 0.37°E

The canton of Les Coteaux is an administrative division of the Hautes-Pyrénées department, southwestern France. It was created at the French canton reorganisation which came into effect in March 2015. Its seat is in Trie-sur-Baïse.

It consists of the following communes:

1. Antin
2. Aries-Espénan
3. Aubarède
4. Barthe
5. Bazordan
6. Bernadets-Debat
7. Betbèze
8. Betpouy
9. Bonnefont
10. Bouilh-Péreuilh
11. Boulin
12. Bugard
13. Cabanac
14. Campuzan
15. Castelnau-Magnoac
16. Castelvieilh
17. Castéra-Lou
18. Casterets
19. Caubous
20. Chelle-Debat
21. Cizos
22. Collongues
23. Coussan
24. Devèze
25. Dours
26. Estampures
27. Fontrailles
28. Fréchède
29. Gaussan
30. Gonez
31. Guizerix
32. Hachan
33. Hourc
34. Jacque
35. Lalanne
36. Lalanne-Trie
37. Lamarque-Rustaing
38. Lansac
39. Lapeyre
40. Laran
41. Larroque
42. Laslades
43. Lassales
44. Lizos
45. Louit
46. Lubret-Saint-Luc
47. Luby-Betmont
48. Lustar
49. Marquerie
50. Marseillan
51. Mazerolles
52. Monléon-Magnoac
53. Monlong
54. Mun
55. Oléac-Debat
56. Organ
57. Osmets
58. Peyret-Saint-André
59. Peyriguère
60. Pouy
61. Pouyastruc
62. Puntous
63. Puydarrieux
64. Sabalos
65. Sadournin
66. Sariac-Magnoac
67. Sère-Rustaing
68. Soréac
69. Souyeaux
70. Thermes-Magnoac
71. Thuy
72. Tournous-Darré
73. Trie-sur-Baïse
74. Vidou
75. Vieuzos
76. Villembits
77. Villemur
