= Maubourguet =

- Commune
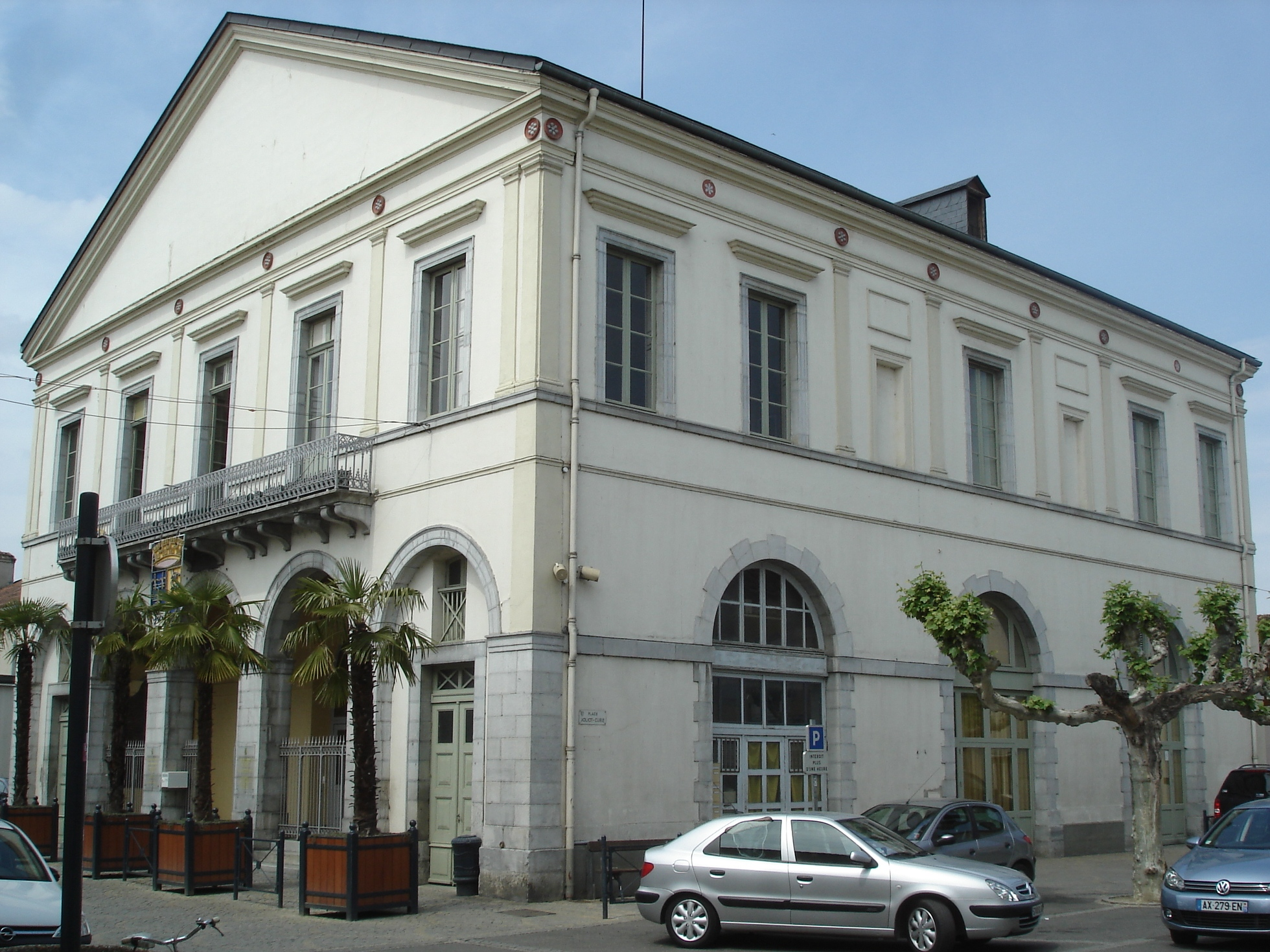
- The town hall of Maubourguet

- Coat of arms
- Location of Maubourguet
- Location within France Location within Occitanie
- Coordinates: 43°28′09″N 0°02′11″E
- Country: France
- Region: Occitania
- Department: Hautes-Pyrénées
- Arrondissement: Tarbes
- Canton: Val d'Adour-Rustan-Madiranais
- Intercommunality: Adour Madiran

Government
  - Mayor (2020–2026): Jean Nadal
- Area^{1}: 22.04 km^{2} (8.51 sq mi)
- Elevation: 181 m (594 ft)
- Highest elevation: 285 m (935 ft)
- Lowest elevation: 164 m (538 ft)
- Population (2023): 2,242
  - Density: 101.7/km^{2} (263.5/sq mi)
- Time zone: UTC+01:00 (CET)
  - Summer (DST): UTC+02:00 (CEST)
- INSEE/Postal code: 65304 /65700
- ^{1} French Land Register data, which excludes lakes, ponds, glaciers > 1 km^{2} (0.386 sq mi or 247 acres) and river estuaries.

Maubourguet (pronounced [mobuʁɡɛ]; Gascon: Mauborguet) is a commune in the Hautes-Pyrénées department in south-western France, in the Occitanie region.

Historically, Maubourguet belonged to the County of Bigorre. The town is situated at the crossing of two major roads, Auch-Pau and Bordeaux-Tarbes.

== Geography ==
Maubourguet is situated in Occitanie, in the north of the Hautes-Pyrénées department. It is mainly located on the shores of the Adour river.

The town is located 625 km (as the crow flies) southwest of the French capital, Paris, 115 km southwest of the regional capital, Toulouse and 26.2 km north-west of the prefecture of the department, Tarbes.

=== Communal boundaries ===
Maubourguet borders on nine different communes.

To the north: Estirac and Sombrun

To the east: Auriébat, Sauveterre and Lafitole

To the south: Vic-en-Bigorre, Nouilhan and Larreule

To the west: Lahitte-Toupière

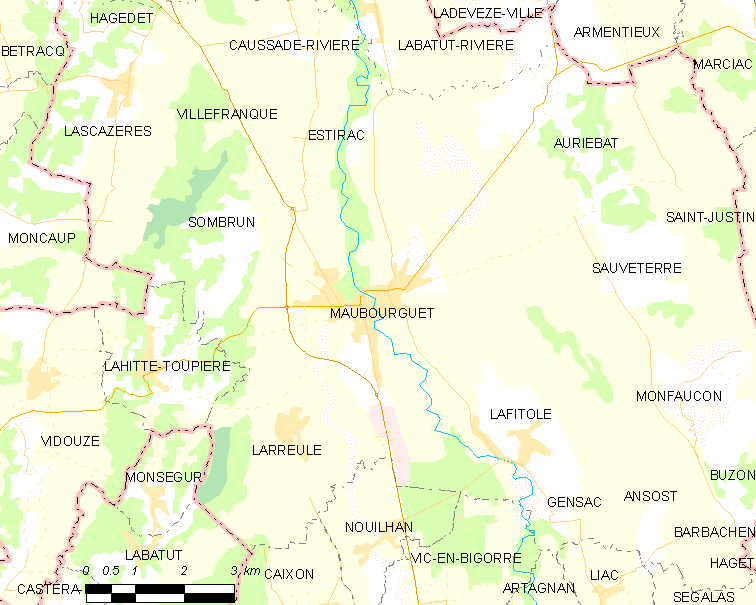
Map of Maubourguet and the neighbouring communes.

=== Topography and Geology ===
Maubourguet is located south of the Aquitaine Basin, a vast sedimentary geological region of the south-west of France, close to the Pyrénées, and in the valley of the Adour, before its bend towards the Atlantic.

The territory of Maubourguet extends over 22.04 km^{2}; its elevation varies between 164 and 285 meters. The highest point of the commune is in the west, on the hills overlooking the plain of the Adour. The minimum elevation is at the level of the Adour when it leaves the territory in the north.

=== Climate ===
Maubourguet has an oceanic climate (Köppen climate classification Cfb) closely bordering on a humid subtropical climate (Cfa). The average annual temperature in Maubourguet is 13.5 °C (56.3 °F). The average annual rainfall is 904.3 mm (35.60 in) with November as the wettest month. The temperatures are highest on average in August, at around 21.6 °C (70.9 °F), and lowest in January, at around 5.9 °C (42.6 °F). The highest temperature ever recorded in Maubourguet was 44.0 °C (111.2 °F) on 11 August 1947; the coldest temperature ever recorded was −15.5 °C (4.1 °F) on 21 February 1956.

Climate data for Maubourguet (1991−2020 normals, extremes 1886−present)
Month	Jan	Feb	Mar	Apr	May	Jun	Jul	Aug	Sep	Oct	Nov	Dec	Year
Record high °C (°F)	23.2 (73.8)	26.9 (80.4)	30.5 (86.9)	34.5 (94.1)	37.0 (98.6)	42.2 (108.0)	42.9 (109.2)	44.0 (111.2)	39.7 (103.5)	35.5 (95.9)	28.2 (82.8)	23.4 (74.1)	44.0 (111.2)
Mean daily maximum °C (°F)	10.8 (51.4)	12.4 (54.3)	15.9 (60.6)	18.3 (64.9)	22.0 (71.6)	25.7 (78.3)	27.9 (82.2)	28.2 (82.8)	25.2 (77.4)	20.6 (69.1)	14.4 (57.9)	11.4 (52.5)	19.4 (66.9)
Daily mean °C (°F)	5.9 (42.6)	6.8 (44.2)	10.0 (50.0)	12.5 (54.5)	16.2 (61.2)	19.7 (67.5)	21.5 (70.7)	21.6 (70.9)	18.3 (64.9)	14.3 (57.7)	9.2 (48.6)	6.4 (43.5)	13.5 (56.3)
Mean daily minimum °C (°F)	1.1 (34.0)	1.3 (34.3)	4.0 (39.2)	6.6 (43.9)	10.4 (50.7)	13.6 (56.5)	15.2 (59.4)	15.0 (59.0)	11.5 (52.7)	8.1 (46.6)	4.0 (39.2)	1.5 (34.7)	7.7 (45.9)
Record low °C (°F)	−15.1 (4.8)	−15.5 (4.1)	−9.6 (14.7)	−3.9 (25.0)	−0.9 (30.4)	3.1 (37.6)	6.2 (43.2)	3.4 (38.1)	0.0 (32.0)	−4.2 (24.4)	−11.0 (12.2)	−13.0 (8.6)	−15.5 (4.1)
Average precipitation mm (inches)	87.2 (3.43)	69.7 (2.74)	75.2 (2.96)	86.8 (3.42)	89.1 (3.51)	69.8 (2.75)	59.4 (2.34)	55.8 (2.20)	61.6 (2.43)	67.7 (2.67)	99.6 (3.92)	82.4 (3.24)	904.3 (35.60)
Average precipitation days (≥ 1.0 mm)	11.4	10.0	10.0	11.1	11.1	8.5	7.5	7.3	8.0	9.4	11.8	10.7	116.8
Source: Météo-France

== Population ==
Historical population
Year	Pop.	±% p.a.
1968	2,479	—
1975	2,583	+0.59%
1982	2,573	−0.06%
1990	2,472	−0.50%
1999	2,412	−0.27%
2007	2,506	+0.48%
2012	2,441	−0.52%
2017	2,377	−0.53%
2023	2,242	−0.97%
Source: INSEE

== See also ==
- Communes of the Hautes-Pyrénées department
