= Buzon =

Buzon may refer to:

== People ==
- Manuel Buzón (1904–1954), Argentinian tango musician
- Patricio Buzon (born 1950), Filipino priest

== Places ==
- Buzon, Hautes-Pyrénées, France
- Villers-Buzon, Doubs, France
