= Sauveterre =

Sauveterre is the name or part of the name of several communes in France:

- Sauveterre, Gard, in the Gard département
- Sauveterre, Gers, in the Gers département
- Sauveterre, Hautes-Pyrénées, in the Hautes-Pyrénées département
- Sauveterre, Tarn, in the Tarn département
- Sauveterre, Tarn-et-Garonne, in the Tarn-et-Garonne département
- Sauveterre-de-Béarn, in the Pyrénées-Atlantiques département
- Sauveterre-de-Comminges, in the Haute-Garonne département
- Sauveterre-de-Guyenne, in the Gironde département
- Sauveterre-de-Rouergue, in the Aveyron département
- Sauveterre-la-Lémance, in the Lot-et-Garonne département
- Sauveterre-Saint-Denis, in the Lot-et-Garonne département
- Causse de Sauveterre, a plateau in Lozère, France
