= Larreule =

Larreule may refer to:

- Larreule, Pyrénées-Atlantiques, a French commune in the Aquitaine region
- Larreule, Hautes-Pyrénées, a French commune in the Midi-Pérénées region
