= Gensac =

Gensac may refer to the following communes in France:

- Gensac, Gironde, in the Gironde department
- Gensac, Hautes-Pyrénées, in the Hautes-Pyrénées department
- Gensac, Tarn-et-Garonne, in the Tarn-et-Garonne department
- Gensac-de-Boulogne, in the Haute-Garonne department
- Gensac-la-Pallue, in the Charente department
- Gensac-sur-Garonne, in the Haute-Garonne department
