= Heres =

Heres, Herés, or Hères may refer to:

- Hères, a commune in Hautes-Pyrénées, France
- Hungarian name for Herendeşti village, Victor Vlad Delamarina, Timiș, Romania
- Heres Municipality, Ciudad Bolívar, Venezuela
- Hans Heres, a Dutch politician
- Luis Hernández Heres, a Cuban former footballer
- heres, the concept in inheritance law in ancient Rome that most closely maps to the modern concept of "heirs"
