= Villefranque =

Villefranque may refer to:

- Villefranque, Hautes-Pyrénées, France
- Villefranque, Pyrénées-Atlantiques, France

== See also ==
- Villafranca (disambiguation)
