= Escondeaux =

- Commune
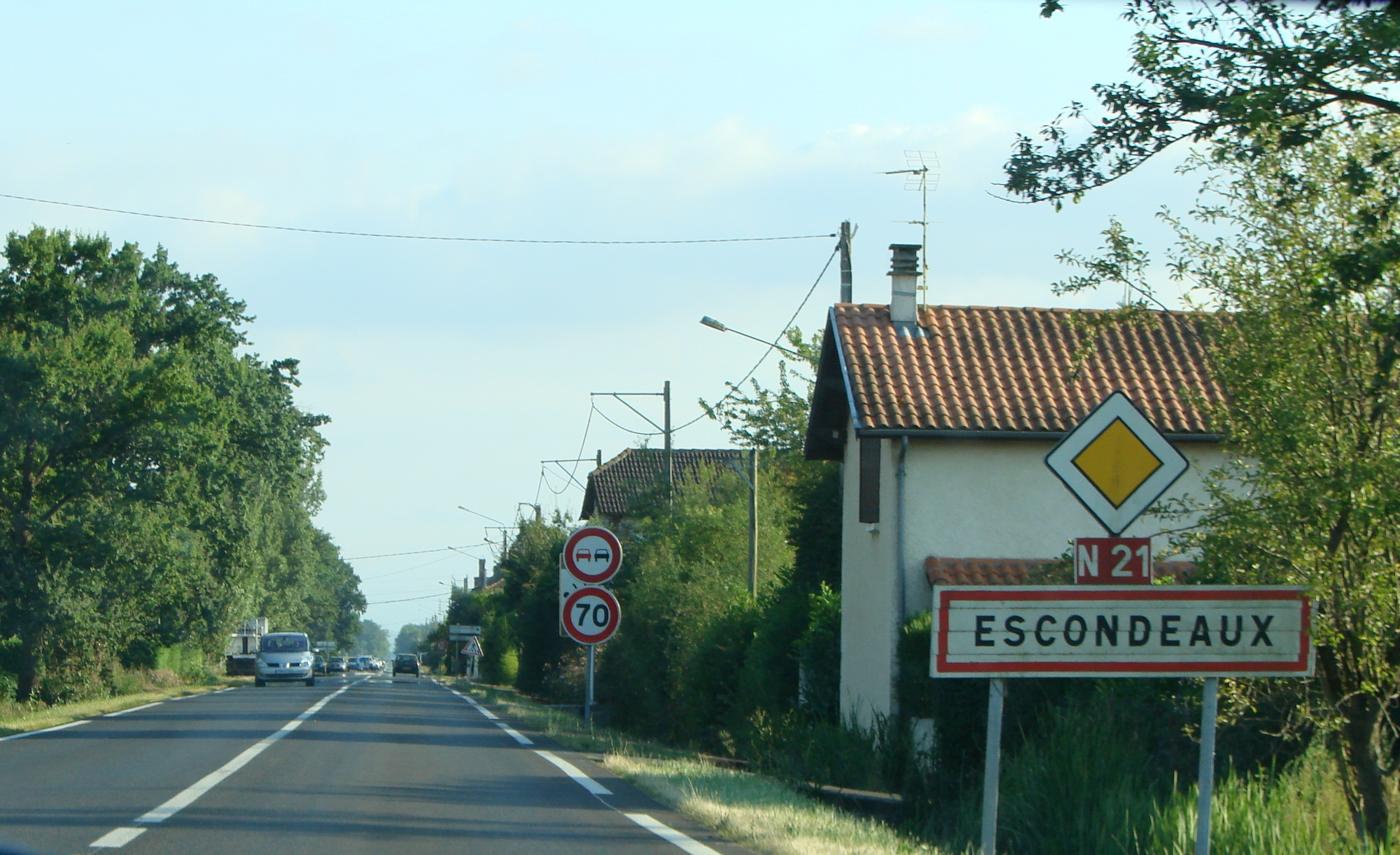
- Entering the village from Rabastens-de-Bigorre

- Coat of arms
- Location of Escondeaux
- Location within France Location within Occitanie
- Coordinates: 43°20′27″N 0°07′50″E
- Country: France
- Region: Occitania
- Department: Hautes-Pyrénées
- Arrondissement: Tarbes
- Canton: Val d'Adour-Rustan-Madiranais
- Intercommunality: Adour Madiran

Government
  - Mayor (2020–2026): Maxime Solvez
- Area^{1}: 3.79 km^{2} (1.46 sq mi)
- Elevation: 250 m (820 ft)
- Highest elevation: 245 m (804 ft)
- Lowest elevation: 224 m (735 ft)
- Population (2023): 280
  - Density: 74/km^{2} (190/sq mi)
- Time zone: UTC+01:00 (CET)
  - Summer (DST): UTC+02:00 (CEST)
- INSEE/Postal code: 65161 /65140
- ^{1} French Land Register data, which excludes lakes, ponds, glaciers > 1 km^{2} (0.386 sq mi or 247 acres) and river estuaries.

Escondeaux is a commune in the Hautes-Pyrénées department in south-western France.

== See also ==
- Communes of the Hautes-Pyrénées department
