= Hagedet =

- Commune
- Coat of arms
- Location of Hagedet
- Location within France Location within Occitanie
- Coordinates: 43°31′10″N 0°01′40″W
- Country: France
- Region: Occitania
- Department: Hautes-Pyrénées
- Arrondissement: Tarbes
- Canton: Val d'Adour-Rustan-Madiranais
- Intercommunality: Adour Madiran

Government
  - Mayor (2020–2026): Véronique Soubabère
- Area^{1}: 2.21 km^{2} (0.85 sq mi)
- Elevation: 300 m (980 ft)
- Highest elevation: 273 m (896 ft)
- Lowest elevation: 155 m (509 ft)
- Population (2023): 38
  - Density: 17/km^{2} (45/sq mi)
- Time zone: UTC+01:00 (CET)
  - Summer (DST): UTC+02:00 (CEST)
- INSEE/Postal code: 65215 /65700
- ^{1} French Land Register data, which excludes lakes, ponds, glaciers > 1 km^{2} (0.386 sq mi or 247 acres) and river estuaries.

Hagedet (French pronunciation: [aʒdɛ]; Occitan: Hagedèth) is a commune in the Hautes-Pyrénées department in south-western France.

== Population ==
Historical population
Year	Pop.	±% p.a.
1968	53	—
1975	42	−3.27%
1982	34	−2.97%
1990	43	+2.98%
1999	40	−0.80%
2007	45	+1.48%
2012	47	+0.87%
2017	46	−0.43%
2023	38	−3.13%
Source: INSEE

== See also ==
- Communes of the Hautes-Pyrénées department
