= Lacassagne =

- Commune
- Coat of arms
- Location of Lacassagne
- Location within France Location within Occitanie
- Coordinates: 43°21′28″N 0°08′59″E
- Country: France
- Region: Occitania
- Department: Hautes-Pyrénées
- Arrondissement: Tarbes
- Canton: Val d'Adour-Rustan-Madiranais

Government
  - Mayor (2020–2026): Julie Carassus-Barragat
- Area^{1}: 6.65 km^{2} (2.57 sq mi)
- Elevation: 255 m (837 ft)
- Highest elevation: 299 m (981 ft)
- Lowest elevation: 219 m (719 ft)
- Population (2023): 251
  - Density: 37.7/km^{2} (97.8/sq mi)
- Time zone: UTC+01:00 (CET)
  - Summer (DST): UTC+02:00 (CEST)
- INSEE/Postal code: 65242 /65140
- ^{1} French Land Register data, which excludes lakes, ponds, glaciers > 1 km^{2} (0.386 sq mi or 247 acres) and river estuaries.

Lacassagne (French pronunciation: [lakasaɲ]; Occitan: La Cassanha) is a commune in the Hautes-Pyrénées department in south-western France.

== See also ==
- Communes of the Hautes-Pyrénées department
