= Soublecause =

- Commune
- Coat of arms
- Location of Soublecause
- Location within France Location within Occitanie
- Coordinates: 43°31′56″N 0°01′34″W
- Country: France
- Region: Occitania
- Department: Hautes-Pyrénées
- Arrondissement: Tarbes
- Canton: Val d'Adour-Rustan-Madiranais

Government
  - Mayor (2020–2026): Joël Lacabanne
- Area^{1}: 6.18 km^{2} (2.39 sq mi)
- Elevation: 160 m (520 ft)
- Highest elevation: 268 m (879 ft)
- Lowest elevation: 147 m (482 ft)
- Population (2023): 173
  - Density: 28.0/km^{2} (72.5/sq mi)
- Time zone: UTC+01:00 (CET)
  - Summer (DST): UTC+02:00 (CEST)
- INSEE/Postal code: 65432 /65700
- ^{1} French Land Register data, which excludes lakes, ponds, glaciers > 1 km^{2} (0.386 sq mi or 247 acres) and river estuaries.

Soublecause (French pronunciation: [subləkoz]; Occitan: Soblacausa) is a commune in the Hautes-Pyrénées department in south-western France.

== See also ==
- Communes of the Hautes-Pyrénées department
