= Ansost =

- Commune
- Coat of arms
- Location of Ansost
- Location within France Location within Occitanie
- Coordinates: 43°26′02″N 0°06′41″E
- Country: France
- Region: Occitania
- Department: Hautes-Pyrénées
- Arrondissement: Tarbes
- Canton: Val d'Adour-Rustan-Madiranais
- Intercommunality: Adour Madiran

Government
  - Mayor (2020–2026): Bernard Roussin
- Area^{1}: 2.2 km^{2} (0.85 sq mi)
- Elevation: 198 m (650 ft)
- Highest elevation: 202 m (663 ft)
- Lowest elevation: 192 m (630 ft)
- Population (2023): 58
  - Density: 26/km^{2} (68/sq mi)
- Time zone: UTC+01:00 (CET)
  - Summer (DST): UTC+02:00 (CEST)
- INSEE/Postal code: 65013 /65140
- ^{1} French Land Register data, which excludes lakes, ponds, glaciers > 1 km^{2} (0.386 sq mi or 247 acres) and river estuaries.

Ansost is a commune in the Hautes-Pyrénées department in southwestern France.

== Population ==
Historical population
Year	Pop.	±% p.a.
1968	70	—
1975	68	−0.41%
1982	59	−2.01%
1990	75	+3.04%
1999	62	−2.09%
2007	54	−1.71%
2012	57	+1.09%
2017	57	+0.00%
2023	58	+0.29%
Source: INSEE

== See also ==
- Communes of the Hautes-Pyrénées department
