= Peyrun =

- Commune
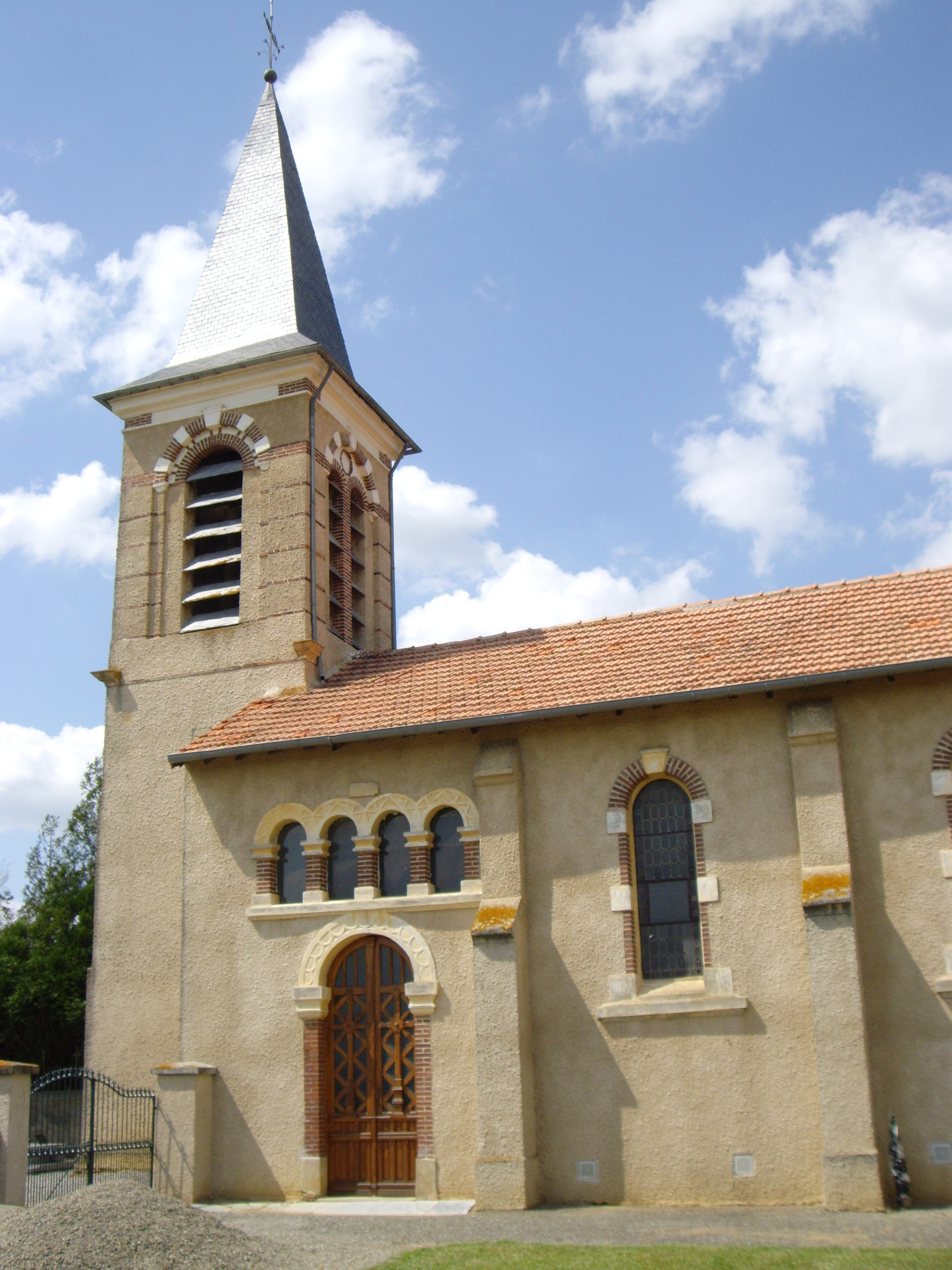
- The church of Saint-Martin

- Coat of arms
- Location of Peyrun
- Location within France Location within Occitanie
- Coordinates: 43°19′55″N 0°11′26″E
- Country: France
- Region: Occitania
- Department: Hautes-Pyrénées
- Arrondissement: Tarbes
- Canton: Val d'Adour-Rustan-Madiranais
- Intercommunality: Adour Madiran

Government
  - Mayor (2020–2026): Gilles Carrillon
- Area^{1}: 4.01 km^{2} (1.55 sq mi)
- Elevation: 220 m (720 ft)
- Highest elevation: 318 m (1,043 ft)
- Lowest elevation: 202 m (663 ft)
- Population (2023): 106
  - Density: 26.4/km^{2} (68.5/sq mi)
- Time zone: UTC+01:00 (CET)
  - Summer (DST): UTC+02:00 (CEST)
- INSEE/Postal code: 65361 /65140
- ^{1} French Land Register data, which excludes lakes, ponds, glaciers > 1 km^{2} (0.386 sq mi or 247 acres) and river estuaries.

Peyrun (French pronunciation: [peʁœ̃]; Occitan: Peirun) is a commune in the Hautes-Pyrénées department in south-western France.

== See also ==
- Communes of the Hautes-Pyrénées department
