= Monfaucon, Hautes-Pyrénées =

Monfaucon
- Commune
- Coat of arms
- Location of Monfaucon
- Location within France Location within Occitanie
- Coordinates: 43°27′10″N 0°07′01″E
- Country: France
- Region: Occitania
- Department: Hautes-Pyrénées
- Arrondissement: Tarbes
- Canton: Val d'Adour-Rustan-Madiranais
- Intercommunality: Adour Madiran

Government
  - Mayor (2020–2026): Roland Dubertrand
- Area^{1}: 10.38 km^{2} (4.01 sq mi)
- Elevation: 270 m (890 ft)
- Highest elevation: 281 m (922 ft)
- Lowest elevation: 157 m (515 ft)
- Population (2023): 198
  - Density: 19.1/km^{2} (49.4/sq mi)
- Time zone: UTC+01:00 (CET)
  - Summer (DST): UTC+02:00 (CEST)
- INSEE/Postal code: 65314 /65140
- ^{1} French Land Register data, which excludes lakes, ponds, glaciers > 1 km^{2} (0.386 sq mi or 247 acres) and river estuaries.

Website for Monfaucon en Bigorre Monfaucon (French pronunciation: [mɔ̃fokɔ̃]; Occitan: Montfaucon) is a commune in the Hautes-Pyrénées department in south-western France.

== See also ==
- Communes of the Hautes-Pyrénées department
