= Saint-Sever-de-Rustan =

- Commune
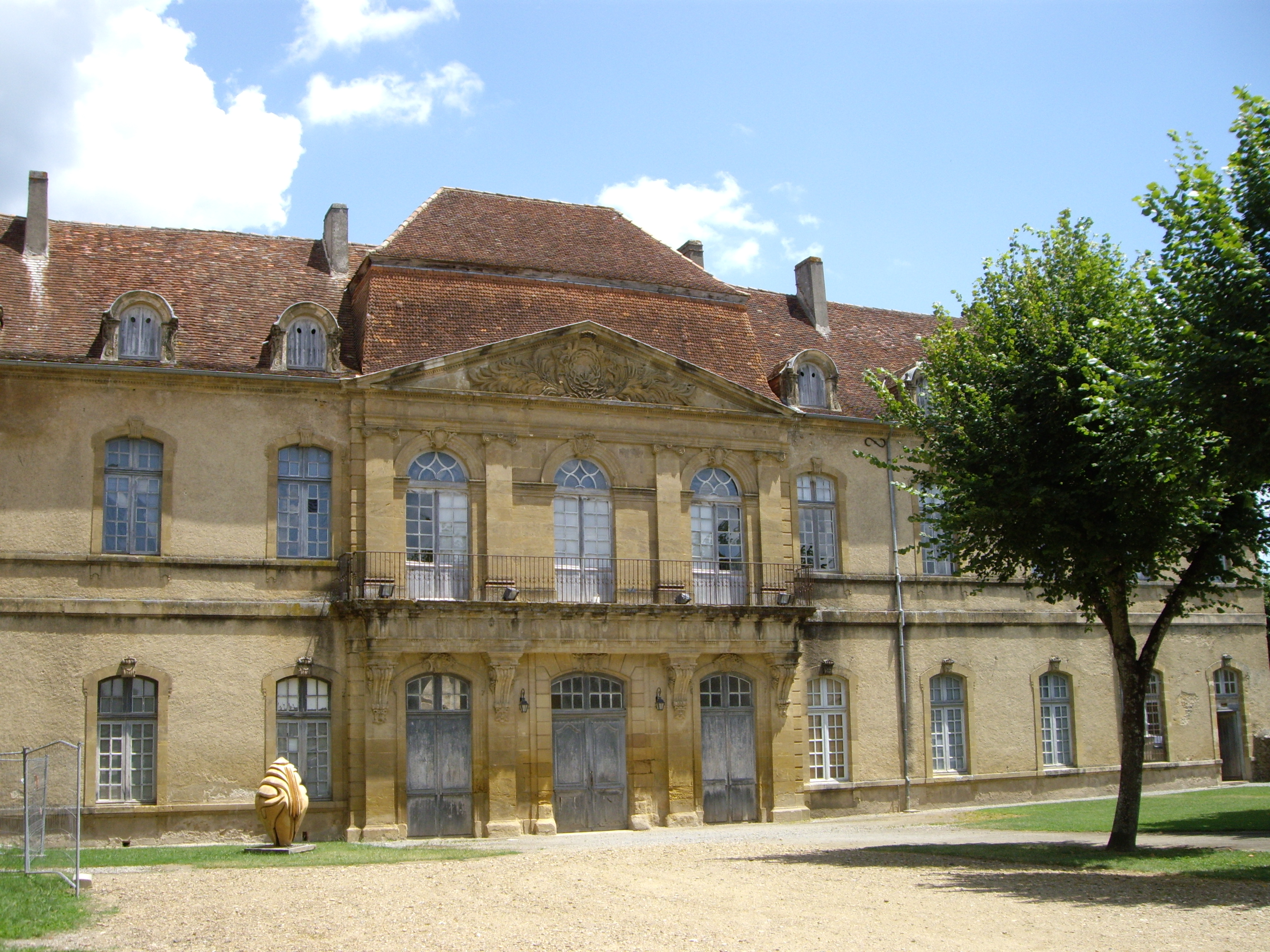
- The town hall

- Coat of arms
- Location of Saint-Sever-de-Rustan
- Location within France Location within Occitanie
- Coordinates: 43°21′09″N 0°13′30″E
- Country: France
- Region: Occitania
- Department: Hautes-Pyrénées
- Arrondissement: Tarbes
- Canton: Val d'Adour-Rustan-Madiranais
- Intercommunality: CC Adour Madiran

Government
  - Mayor (2020–2026): Jean-Pierre Curdi
- Area^{1}: 9.52 km^{2} (3.68 sq mi)
- Elevation: 198 m (650 ft)
- Highest elevation: 385 m (1,263 ft)
- Lowest elevation: 179 m (587 ft)
- Population (2023): 156
  - Density: 16.4/km^{2} (42.4/sq mi)
- Time zone: UTC+01:00 (CET)
  - Summer (DST): UTC+02:00 (CEST)
- INSEE/Postal code: 65397 /65140
- ^{1} French Land Register data, which excludes lakes, ponds, glaciers > 1 km^{2} (0.386 sq mi or 247 acres) and river estuaries.

Saint-Sever-de-Rustan (before 1962: Saint-Sever) is a commune in the Hautes-Pyrénées department in south-western France.

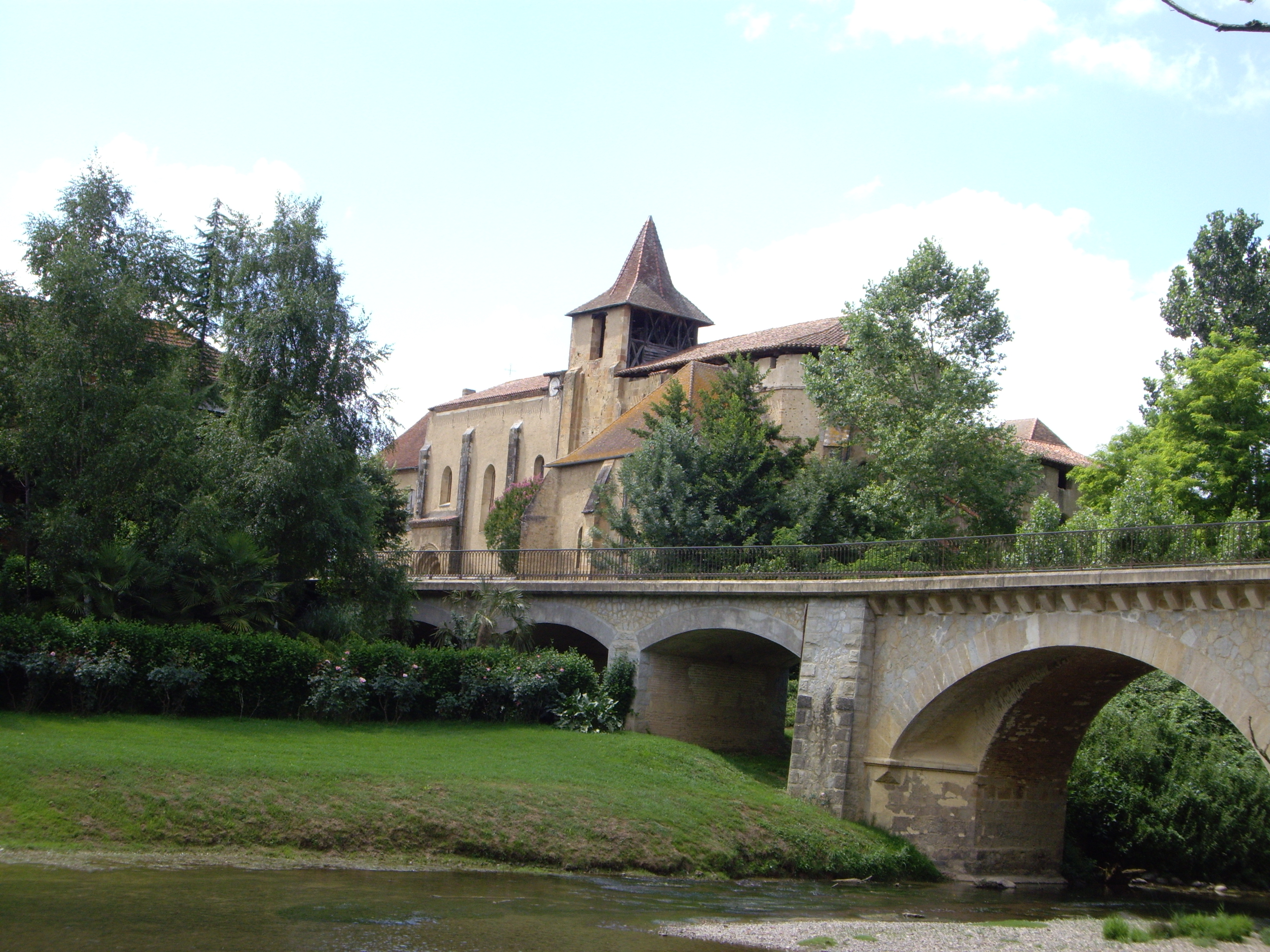
Saint-Sever-de-Rustan Abbey

== See also ==
- Communes of the Hautes-Pyrénées department
