= Sénac =

- Commune
- Coat of arms
- Location of Sénac
- Location within France Location within Occitanie
- Coordinates: 43°21′27″N 0°11′02″E
- Country: France
- Region: Occitania
- Department: Hautes-Pyrénées
- Arrondissement: Tarbes
- Canton: Val d'Adour-Rustan-Madiranais
- Intercommunality: Adour Madiran

Government
  - Mayor (2020–2026): Antoine Lapeze-Charlier
- Area^{1}: 8.94 km^{2} (3.45 sq mi)
- Elevation: 300 m (980 ft)
- Highest elevation: 306 m (1,004 ft)
- Lowest elevation: 179 m (587 ft)
- Population (2023): 294
  - Density: 32.9/km^{2} (85.2/sq mi)
- Time zone: UTC+01:00 (CET)
  - Summer (DST): UTC+02:00 (CEST)
- INSEE/Postal code: 65418 /65140
- ^{1} French Land Register data, which excludes lakes, ponds, glaciers > 1 km^{2} (0.386 sq mi or 247 acres) and river estuaries.

Sénac (French pronunciation: [senak]; Occitan: Senac) is a small village located in the south of France, in the department of Hautes-Pyrénées of the region Occitanie. The INSEE code for Sénac is 65418, and the Sénac zip code is 65140.

== Geography and map of Sénac ==
The altitude of the city hall of Sénac is approximately 270 meters. The Sénac surface is 8.94 km ². The latitude and longitude of Sénac are 43.356 degrees North and 0.186 degrees East. Nearby cities and towns of Sénac are : Mingot (65140) at 1.91 km, Mansan (65140) at 1.94 km, Peyrun (65140) at 2.78 km, Lacassagne (65140) at 2.94 km, Montégut-Arros (32730) at 3.13 km, Saint-Sever-de-Rustan (65140) at 3.13 km, Lescurry (65140) at 3.30 km, Laméac (65140) at 4.33 km. (The distances to these nearby towns of Sénac are calculated as the crow flies)

== Population and housing of Sénac ==
The population of Sénac was 215 in 1999, 239 in 2006 and 243 in 2007. The population density of Sénac is 27.18 inhabitants per km^{2}. The number of housing of Sénac was 106 in 2007. These homes of Sénac consist of 98 main residences, 7 second or occasional homes and 1 vacant homes.

== See also ==
- Communes of the Hautes-Pyrénées department
