= Mingot =

- Commune
- Coat of arms
- Location of Mingot
- Location within France Location within Occitanie
- Coordinates: 43°22′31″N 0°10′27″E
- Country: France
- Region: Occitania
- Department: Hautes-Pyrénées
- Arrondissement: Tarbes
- Canton: Val d'Adour-Rustan-Madiranais
- Intercommunality: Adour Madiran

Government
  - Mayor (2020–2026): Eric Duffrechou
- Area^{1}: 1.73 km^{2} (0.67 sq mi)
- Elevation: 300 m (980 ft)
- Highest elevation: 296 m (971 ft)
- Lowest elevation: 213 m (699 ft)
- Population (2023): 99
  - Density: 57/km^{2} (150/sq mi)
- Time zone: UTC+01:00 (CET)
  - Summer (DST): UTC+02:00 (CEST)
- INSEE/Postal code: 65311 /65140
- ^{1} French Land Register data, which excludes lakes, ponds, glaciers > 1 km^{2} (0.386 sq mi or 247 acres) and river estuaries.

Mingot is a commune in the Hautes-Pyrénées department in south-western France.

== See also ==
- Communes of the Hautes-Pyrénées department
