= Bazillac =

- Commune
- Coat of arms
- Location of Bazillac
- Location within France Location within Occitanie
- Coordinates: 43°21′20″N 0°06′04″E
- Country: France
- Region: Occitania
- Department: Hautes-Pyrénées
- Arrondissement: Tarbes
- Canton: Val d'Adour-Rustan-Madiranais

Government
  - Mayor (2020–2026): Charles Rocheteau
- Area^{1}: 10.28 km^{2} (3.97 sq mi)
- Elevation: 230 m (750 ft)
- Highest elevation: 239 m (784 ft)
- Lowest elevation: 222 m (728 ft)
- Population (2023): 373
  - Density: 36.3/km^{2} (94.0/sq mi)
- Time zone: UTC+01:00 (CET)
  - Summer (DST): UTC+02:00 (CEST)
- INSEE/Postal code: 65073 /65140
- ^{1} French Land Register data, which excludes lakes, ponds, glaciers > 1 km^{2} (0.386 sq mi or 247 acres) and river estuaries.

Bazillac (French pronunciation: [bazijak]；Occitan: Baselhac) is a commune in the Hautes-Pyrénées department in southwestern France.

== Population ==
Historical population
Year	Pop.	±% p.a.
1968	335	—
1975	319	−0.70%
1982	352	+1.42%
1990	317	−1.30%
1999	304	−0.46%
2007	353	+1.89%
2012	320	−1.94%
2017	347	+1.63%
2023	373	+1.21%
Source: INSEE

== See also ==
- Communes of the Hautes-Pyrénées department
