= Arrondissement of Tarbes =

Coordinates: 43°14′N 0°04′E

Tarbes
- Arrondissement
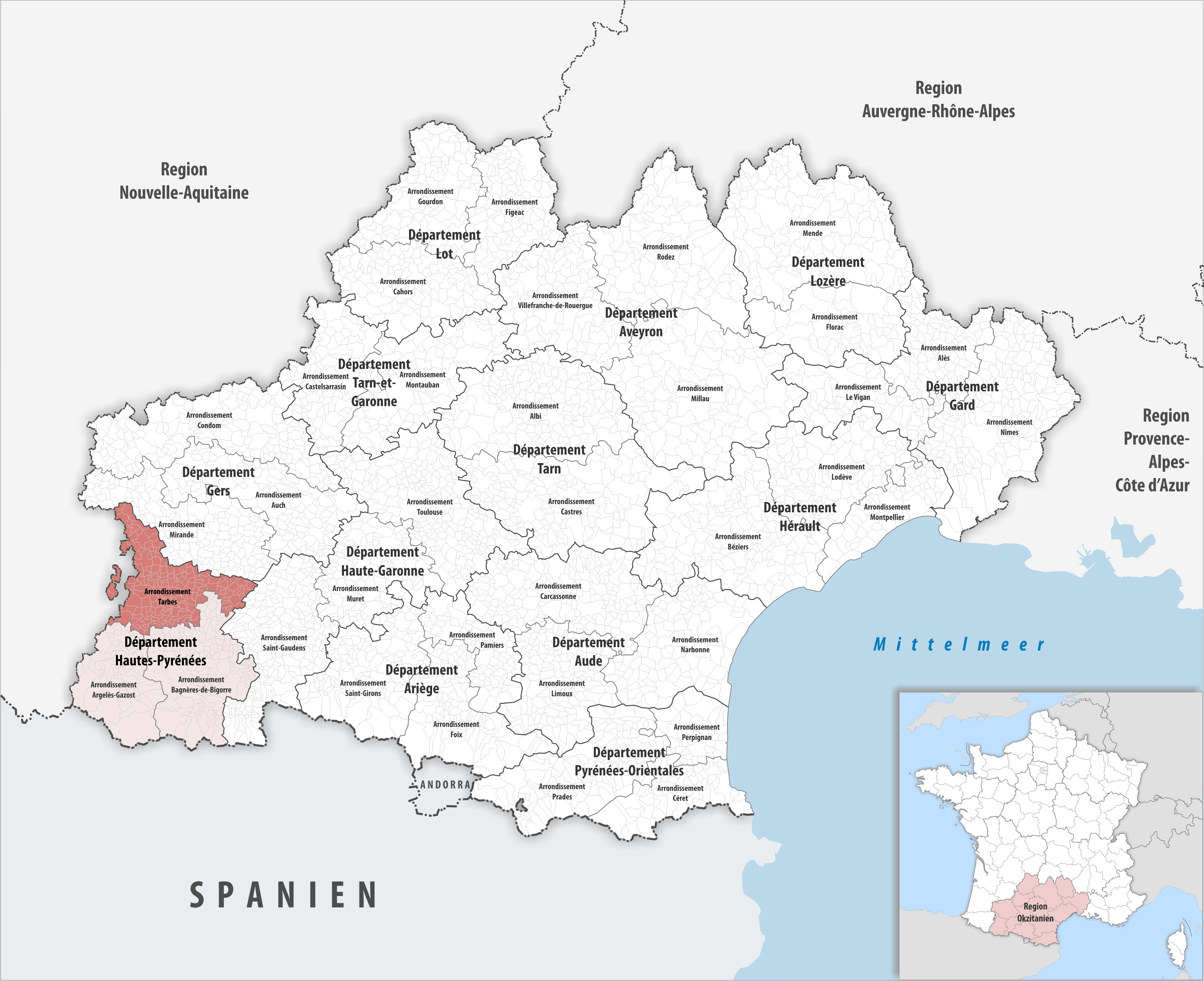
- Location within the region Occitanie
- Country: France
- Region: Occitania
- Department: Hautes-Pyrénées
- No. of communes: {{{nbcomm}}}
- Area: 1,380.4 km^{2} (533.0 sq mi)
- Population (2023): 145,550
  - Density: 105.44/km^{2} (273.09/sq mi)
- INSEE code: 653

The arrondissement of Tarbes is an arrondissement of France in the Hautes-Pyrénées department in the Occitanie region. It has 212 communes. Its population is 144,942 (2021), and its area is 1,380.4 km^{2} (533.0 sq mi).

== Composition ==
The communes of the arrondissement of Tarbes, and their INSEE codes, are:

1. Allier (65005)
2. Andrest (65007)
3. Angos (65010)
4. Ansost (65013)
5. Antin (65015)
6. Arcizac-Adour (65019)
7. Aries-Espénan (65026)
8. Artagnan (65035)
9. Aubarède (65044)
10. Aureilhan (65047)
11. Aurensan (65048)
12. Auriébat (65049)
13. Averan (65052)
14. Azereix (65057)
15. Barbachen (65061)
16. Barbazan-Debat (65062)
17. Barbazan-Dessus (65063)
18. Barry (65067)
19. Barthe (65068)
20. Bazet (65072)
21. Bazillac (65073)
22. Bazordan (65074)
23. Bégole (65079)
24. Bénac (65080)
25. Bernac-Debat (65083)
26. Bernac-Dessus (65084)
27. Bernadets-Debat (65085)
28. Bernadets-Dessus (65086)
29. Betbèze (65088)
30. Betpouy (65090)
31. Bonnefont (65095)
32. Bordères-sur-l'Échez (65100)
33. Bordes (65101)
34. Bouilh-Devant (65102)
35. Bouilh-Péreuilh (65103)
36. Boulin (65104)
37. Bours (65108)
38. Bugard (65110)
39. Burg (65113)
40. Buzon (65114)
41. Cabanac (65115)
42. Caharet (65118)
43. Caixon (65119)
44. Calavanté (65120)
45. Camalès (65121)
46. Campuzan (65126)
47. Castelnau-Magnoac (65129)
48. Castelnau-Rivière-Basse (65130)
49. Castelvieilh (65131)
50. Castéra-Lanusse (65132)
51. Castéra-Lou (65133)
52. Casterets (65134)
53. Caubous (65136)
54. Caussade-Rivière (65137)
55. Chelle-Debat (65142)
56. Chis (65146)
57. Cizos (65148)
58. Clarac (65149)
59. Collongues (65151)
60. Coussan (65153)
61. Devèze (65155)
62. Dours (65156)
63. Escaunets (65160)
64. Escondeaux (65161)
65. Estampures (65170)
66. Estirac (65174)
67. Fontrailles (65177)
68. Fréchède (65178)
69. Fréchou-Fréchet (65181)
70. Gardères (65185)
71. Gaussan (65187)
72. Gayan (65189)
73. Gensac (65196)
74. Gonez (65204)
75. Goudon (65206)
76. Guizerix (65213)
77. Hachan (65214)
78. Hagedet (65215)
79. Hères (65219)
80. Hibarette (65220)
81. Hitte (65222)
82. Horgues (65223)
83. Hourc (65225)
84. Ibos (65226)
85. Jacque (65232)
86. Juillan (65235)
87. Labatut-Rivière (65240)
88. Lacassagne (65242)
89. Lafitole (65243)
90. Lagarde (65244)
91. Lahitte-Toupière (65248)
92. Lalanne (65249)
93. Lalanne-Trie (65250)
94. Laloubère (65251)
95. Lamarque-Pontacq (65252)
96. Lamarque-Rustaing (65253)
97. Laméac (65254)
98. Lanespède (65256)
99. Lanne (65257)
100. Lansac (65259)
101. Lapeyre (65260)
102. Laran (65261)
103. Larreule (65262)
104. Larroque (65263)
105. Lascazères (65264)
106. Laslades (65265)
107. Lassales (65266)
108. Layrisse (65268)
109. Lescurry (65269)
110. Lespouey (65270)
111. Lhez (65272)
112. Liac (65273)
113. Lizos (65276)
114. Loucrup (65281)
115. Louey (65284)
116. Louit (65285)
117. Lubret-Saint-Luc (65288)
118. Luby-Betmont (65289)
119. Luc (65290)
120. Luquet (65292)
121. Lustar (65293)
122. Madiran (65296)
123. Mansan (65297)
124. Marquerie (65298)
125. Marsac (65299)
126. Marseillan (65301)
127. Mascaras (65303)
128. Maubourguet (65304)
129. Mazerolles (65308)
130. Mingot (65311)
131. Momères (65313)
132. Montfaucon (65314)
133. Monléon-Magnoac (65315)
134. Monlong (65316)
135. Montignac (65321)
136. Moulédous (65324)
137. Moumoulous (65325)
138. Mun (65326)
139. Nouilhan (65330)
140. Odos (65331)
141. Oléac-Debat (65332)
142. Oléac-Dessus (65333)
143. Organ (65336)
144. Orieux (65337)
145. Orincles (65339)
146. Orleix (65340)
147. Oroix (65341)
148. Osmets (65342)
149. Ossun (65344)
150. Oueilloux (65346)
151. Oursbelille (65350)
152. Ozon (65353)
153. Peyraube (65357)
154. Peyret-Saint-André (65358)
155. Peyriguère (65359)
156. Peyrun (65361)
157. Pintac (65364)
158. Poumarous (65367)
159. Pouy (65368)
160. Pouyastruc (65369)
161. Pujo (65372)
162. Puntous (65373)
163. Puydarrieux (65374)
164. Rabastens-de-Bigorre (65375)
165. Ricaud (65378)
166. Sabalos (65380)
167. Sadournin (65383)
168. Saint-Lanne (65387)
169. Saint-Lézer (65390)
170. Saint-Martin (65392)
171. Saint-Sever-de-Rustan (65397)
172. Salles-Adour (65401)
173. Sanous (65403)
174. Sariac-Magnoac (65404)
175. Sarniguet (65406)
176. Sarriac-Bigorre (65409)
177. Sarrouilles (65410)
178. Sauveterre (65412)
179. Ségalas (65414)
180. Séméac (65417)
181. Sénac (65418)
182. Sère-Rustaing (65423)
183. Séron (65422)
184. Siarrouy (65425)
185. Sinzos (65426)
186. Sombrun (65429)
187. Soréac (65430)
188. Soublecause (65432)
189. Soues (65433)
190. Souyeaux (65436)
191. Talazac (65438)
192. Tarasteix (65439)
193. Tarbes (65440)
194. Thermes-Magnoac (65442)
195. Thuy (65443)
196. Tostat (65446)
197. Tournay (65447)
198. Tournous-Darré (65448)
199. Trie-sur-Baïse (65452)
200. Trouley-Labarthe (65454)
201. Ugnouas (65457)
202. Vic-en-Bigorre (65460)
203. Vidou (65461)
204. Vidouze (65462)
205. Vielle-Adour (65464)
206. Vieuzos (65468)
207. Villefranque (65472)
208. Villembits (65474)
209. Villemur (65475)
210. Villenave-près-Béarn (65476)
211. Villenave-près-Marsac (65477)
212. Visker (65479)

== History ==
The arrondissement of Tarbes was created in 1800. In January 2017 it lost 13 communes to the arrondissement of Bagnères-de-Bigorre.

As a result of the reorganisation of the cantons of France which came into effect in 2015, the borders of the cantons are no longer related to the borders of the arrondissements. The cantons of the arrondissement of Tarbes were, as of January 2015:

1. Aureilhan
2. Bordères-sur-l'Échez
3. Castelnau-Magnoac
4. Castelnau-Rivière-Basse
5. Galan
6. Laloubère
7. Maubourguet
8. Ossun
9. Pouyastruc
10. Rabastens-de-Bigorre
11. Séméac
12. Tarbes-1
13. Tarbes-2
14. Tarbes-3
15. Tarbes-4
16. Tarbes-5
17. Tournay
18. Trie-sur-Baïse
19. Vic-en-Bigorre
