= Ségalas, Hautes-Pyrénées =

Ségalas
- Commune
- Coat of arms
- Location of Ségalas
- Location within France Location within Occitanie
- Coordinates: 43°24′46″N 0°07′14″E
- Country: France
- Region: Occitania
- Department: Hautes-Pyrénées
- Arrondissement: Tarbes
- Canton: Val d'Adour-Rustan-Madiranais
- Area^{1}: 5.97 km^{2} (2.31 sq mi)
- Elevation: 210 m (690 ft)
- Highest elevation: 214 m (702 ft)
- Lowest elevation: 201 m (659 ft)
- Population (2023): 81
  - Density: 14/km^{2} (35/sq mi)
- Time zone: UTC+01:00 (CET)
  - Summer (DST): UTC+02:00 (CEST)
- INSEE/Postal code: 65414 /65140
- ^{1} French Land Register data, which excludes lakes, ponds, glaciers > 1 km^{2} (0.386 sq mi or 247 acres) and river estuaries.

Ségalas is a commune in the Hautes-Pyrénées department in south-western France.

== See also ==
- Communes of the Hautes-Pyrénées department
