= Lescurry =

- Commune
- Coat of arms
- Location of Lescurry
- Location within France Location within Occitanie
- Coordinates: 43°20′12″N 0°09′18″E
- Country: France
- Region: Occitania
- Department: Hautes-Pyrénées
- Arrondissement: Tarbes
- Canton: Val d'Adour-Rustan-Madiranais
- Intercommunality: Adour Madiran

Government
  - Mayor (2020–2026): Dominique Delluc
- Area^{1}: 5.02 km^{2} (1.94 sq mi)
- Elevation: 270 m (890 ft)
- Highest elevation: 315 m (1,033 ft)
- Lowest elevation: 225 m (738 ft)
- Population (2023): 161
  - Density: 32.1/km^{2} (83.1/sq mi)
- Time zone: UTC+01:00 (CET)
  - Summer (DST): UTC+02:00 (CEST)
- INSEE/Postal code: 65269 /65140
- ^{1} French Land Register data, which excludes lakes, ponds, glaciers > 1 km^{2} (0.386 sq mi or 247 acres) and river estuaries.

Lescurry (French pronunciation: [lɛskyʁi]; Occitan: Lescurri) is a commune in the Hautes-Pyrénées department in south-western France.

== See also ==
- Communes of the Hautes-Pyrénées department
