= Ugnouas =

- Commune
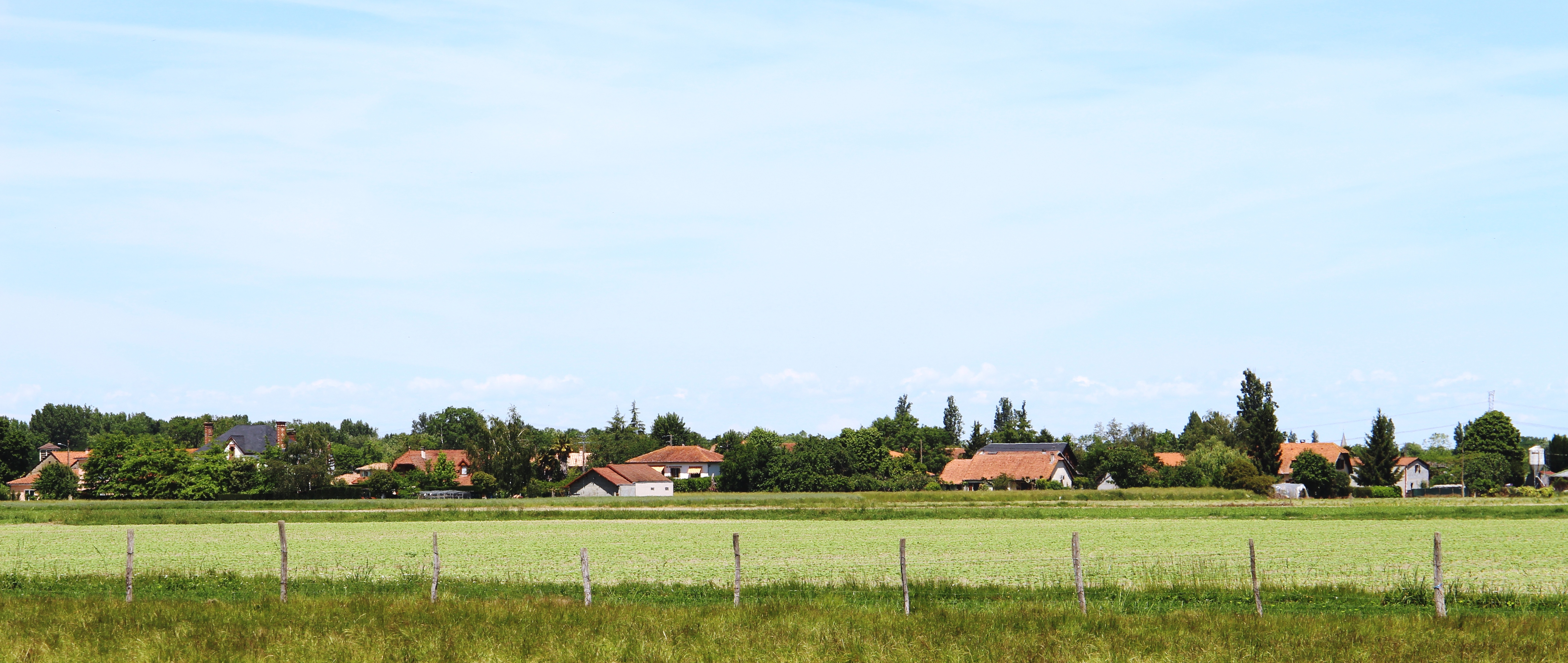

- Coat of arms
- Location of Ugnouas
- Location within France Location within Occitanie
- Coordinates: 43°20′30″N 0°06′00″E
- Country: France
- Region: Occitania
- Department: Hautes-Pyrénées
- Arrondissement: Tarbes
- Canton: Val d'Adour-Rustan-Madiranais
- Intercommunality: Adour Madiran
- Area^{1}: 1.59 km^{2} (0.61 sq mi)
- Elevation: 240 m (790 ft)
- Highest elevation: 243 m (797 ft)
- Lowest elevation: 235 m (771 ft)
- Population (2023): 87
  - Density: 55/km^{2} (140/sq mi)
- Time zone: UTC+01:00 (CET)
  - Summer (DST): UTC+02:00 (CEST)
- INSEE/Postal code: 65457 /65140
- ^{1} French Land Register data, which excludes lakes, ponds, glaciers > 1 km^{2} (0.386 sq mi or 247 acres) and river estuaries.

Ugnouas is a commune in the Hautes-Pyrénées department in south-western France.

== See also ==
- Communes of the Hautes-Pyrénées department
