= Liac =

- Commune
- Coat of arms
- Location of Liac
- Location within France Location within Occitanie
- Coordinates: 43°24′56″N 0°05′59″E
- Country: France
- Region: Occitania
- Department: Hautes-Pyrénées
- Arrondissement: Tarbes
- Canton: Val d'Adour-Rustan-Madiranais
- Intercommunality: Adour Madiran

Government
  - Mayor (2020–2026): Michel Menoni
- Area^{1}: 4.17 km^{2} (1.61 sq mi)
- Elevation: 210 m (690 ft)
- Highest elevation: 211 m (692 ft)
- Lowest elevation: 199 m (653 ft)
- Population (2023): 200
  - Density: 48/km^{2} (120/sq mi)
- Time zone: UTC+01:00 (CET)
  - Summer (DST): UTC+02:00 (CEST)
- INSEE/Postal code: 65273 /65140
- ^{1} French Land Register data, which excludes lakes, ponds, glaciers > 1 km^{2} (0.386 sq mi or 247 acres) and river estuaries.

Liac (French pronunciation: [ljak]) is a commune in the Hautes-Pyrénées department in south-western France.

== See also ==
- Communes of the Hautes-Pyrénées department
