= Vidouze =

- Commune
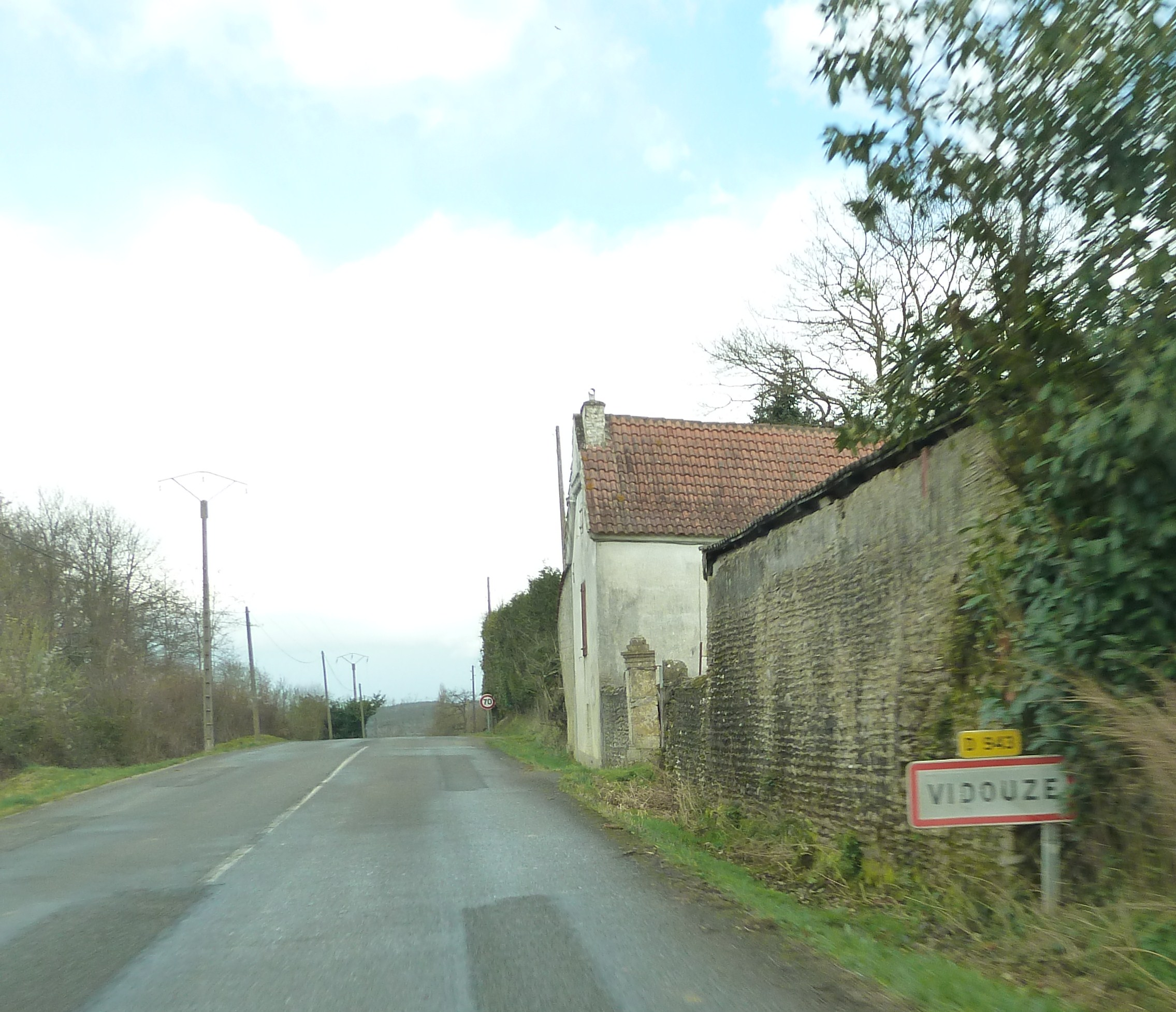
- The road into Vidouze

- Coat of arms
- Location of Vidouze
- Location within France Location within Occitanie
- Coordinates: 43°26′41″N 0°02′52″W
- Country: France
- Region: Occitania
- Department: Hautes-Pyrénées
- Arrondissement: Tarbes
- Canton: Val d'Adour-Rustan-Madiranais
- Intercommunality: Adour Madiran

Government
  - Mayor (2020–2026): Alexis Bonnargent
- Area^{1}: 16.01 km^{2} (6.18 sq mi)
- Elevation: 230 m (750 ft)
- Highest elevation: 322 m (1,056 ft)
- Lowest elevation: 180 m (590 ft)
- Population (2023): 230
  - Density: 14/km^{2} (37/sq mi)
- Time zone: UTC+01:00 (CET)
  - Summer (DST): UTC+02:00 (CEST)
- INSEE/Postal code: 65462 /65700
- ^{1} French Land Register data, which excludes lakes, ponds, glaciers > 1 km^{2} (0.386 sq mi or 247 acres) and river estuaries.

Vidouze (French pronunciation: [viduz]; Occitan: Vidosa) is a commune in the Hautes-Pyrénées department in south-western France.

== See also ==
- Communes of the Hautes-Pyrénées department
