= Mansan, Hautes-Pyrénées =

Mansan
- Commune
- Location of Mansan
- Location within France Location within Occitanie
- Coordinates: 43°20′27″N 0°11′36″E
- Country: France
- Region: Occitania
- Department: Hautes-Pyrénées
- Arrondissement: Tarbes
- Canton: Val d'Adour-Rustan-Madiranais
- Intercommunality: Adour Madiran

Government
  - Mayor (2020–2026): Didier Cuvelier
- Area^{1}: 2.08 km^{2} (0.80 sq mi)
- Elevation: 300 m (980 ft)
- Highest elevation: 311 m (1,020 ft)
- Lowest elevation: 194 m (636 ft)
- Population (2023): 39
  - Density: 19/km^{2} (49/sq mi)
- Time zone: UTC+01:00 (CET)
  - Summer (DST): UTC+02:00 (CEST)
- INSEE/Postal code: 65297 /65140
- ^{1} French Land Register data, which excludes lakes, ponds, glaciers > 1 km^{2} (0.386 sq mi or 247 acres) and river estuaries.

Mansan (French pronunciation: [mɑ̃sɑ̃]; Occitan: Mançan) is a commune in the Hautes-Pyrénées department in south-western France.

== See also ==
- Communes of the Hautes-Pyrénées department
