= Labatut-Rivière =

- Commune
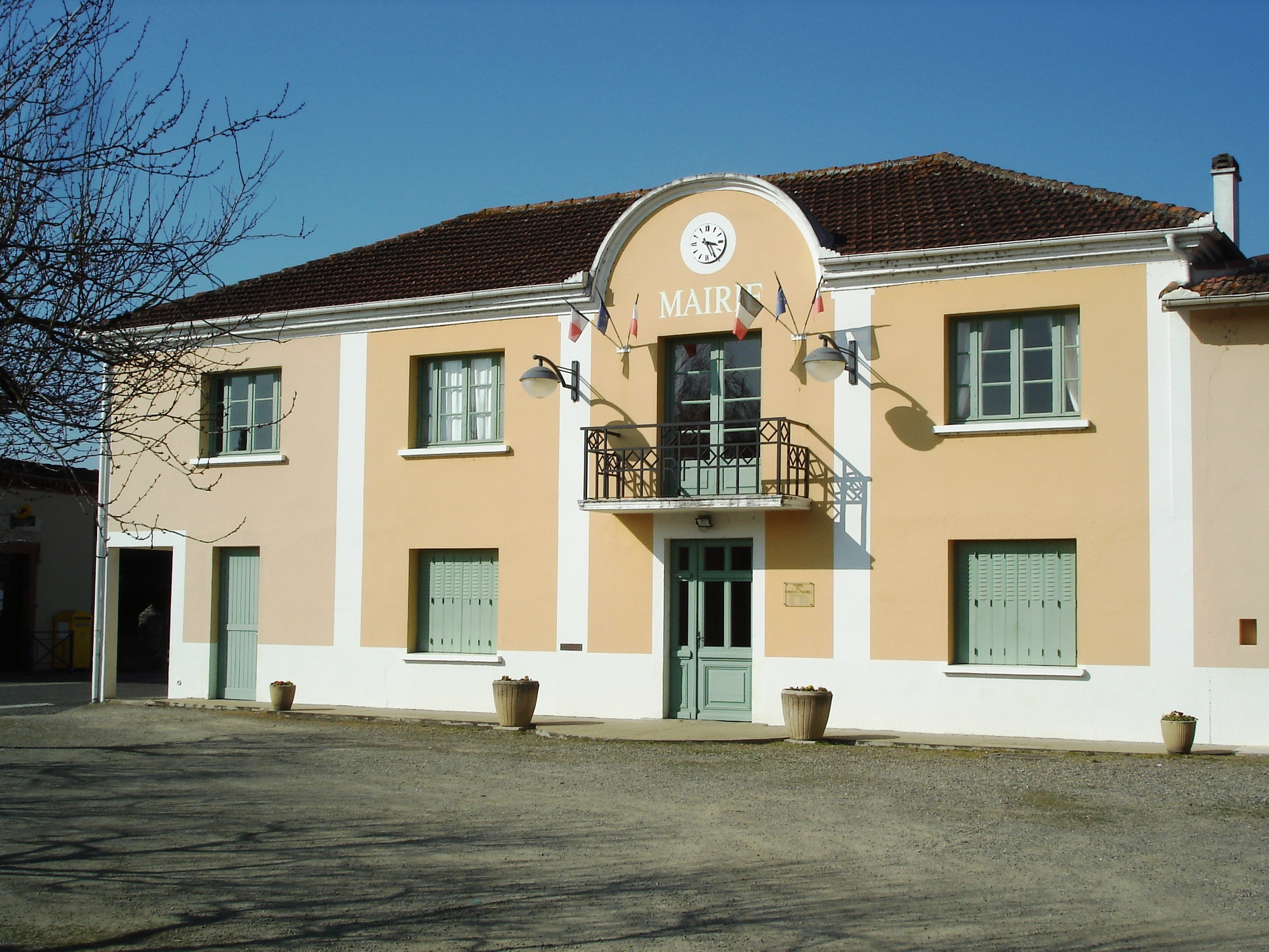
- La mairie de Labatut-Rivière

- Coat of arms
- Location of Labatut-Rivière
- Location within France Location within Occitanie
- Coordinates: 43°31′40″N 0°02′03″E
- Country: France
- Region: Occitania
- Department: Hautes-Pyrénées
- Arrondissement: Tarbes
- Canton: Val d'Adour-Rustan-Madiranais
- Intercommunality: Adour Madiran

Government
  - Mayor (2020–2026): Robert Maisonneuve
- Area^{1}: 12.71 km^{2} (4.91 sq mi)
- Elevation: 156 m (512 ft)
- Highest elevation: 226 m (741 ft)
- Lowest elevation: 148 m (486 ft)
- Population (2023): 394
  - Density: 31.0/km^{2} (80.3/sq mi)
- Time zone: UTC+01:00 (CET)
  - Summer (DST): UTC+02:00 (CEST)
- INSEE/Postal code: 65240 /65700
- ^{1} French Land Register data, which excludes lakes, ponds, glaciers > 1 km^{2} (0.386 sq mi or 247 acres) and river estuaries.

Labatut-Rivière (French pronunciation: [labaty ʁivjɛʁ]; Occitan: L'Abatut) is a commune in the Hautes-Pyrénées department in south-western France.

== The Church of the Assumption ==
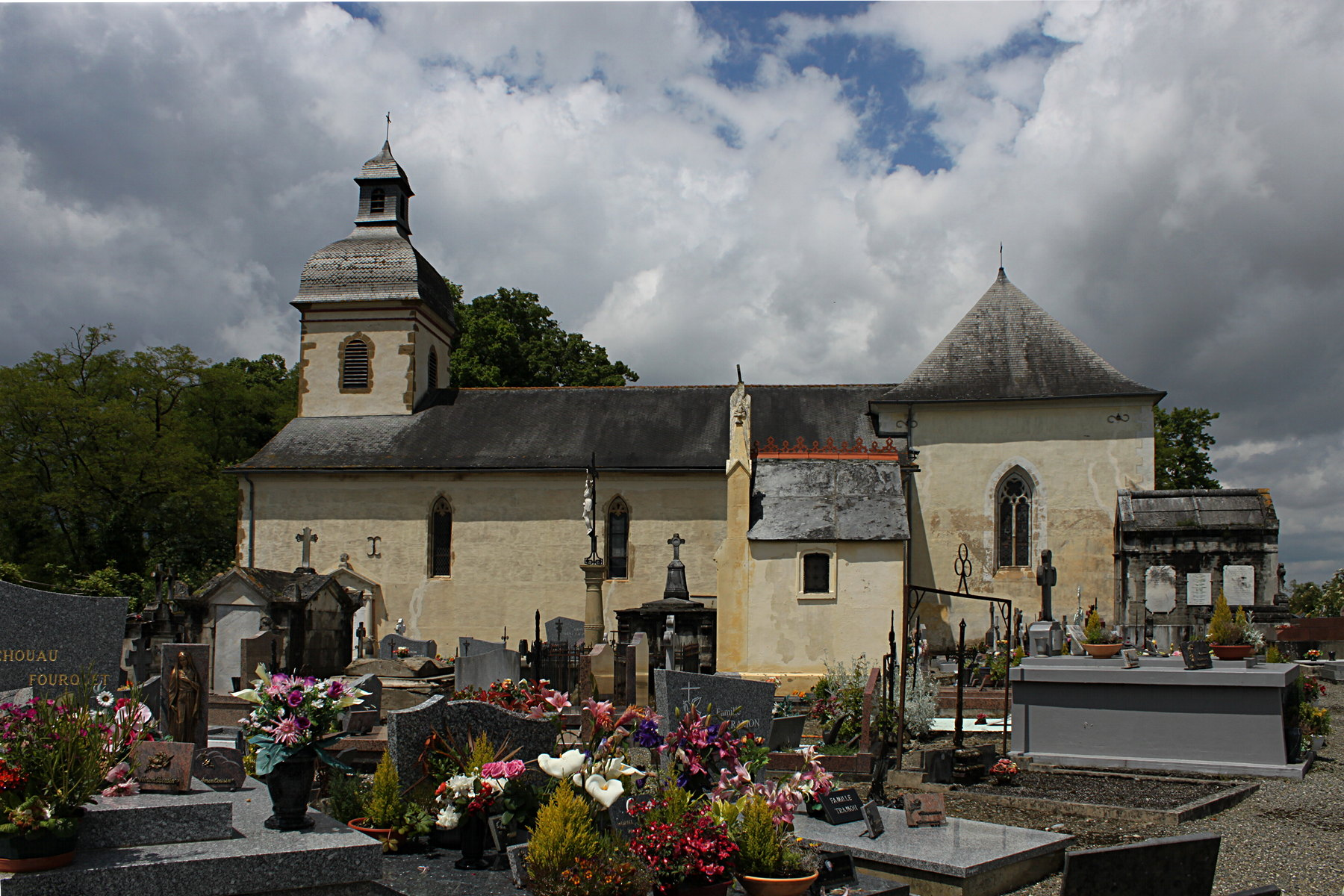
Church of the Assumption, Labatut-Rivière.

The church was restored in 1846, while the most recent restoration work was carried out in 2007. There is a cemetery that includes a chapel to Darré Libéros.

== See also ==
- Communes of the Hautes-Pyrénées department
