= Moumoulous =

- Commune
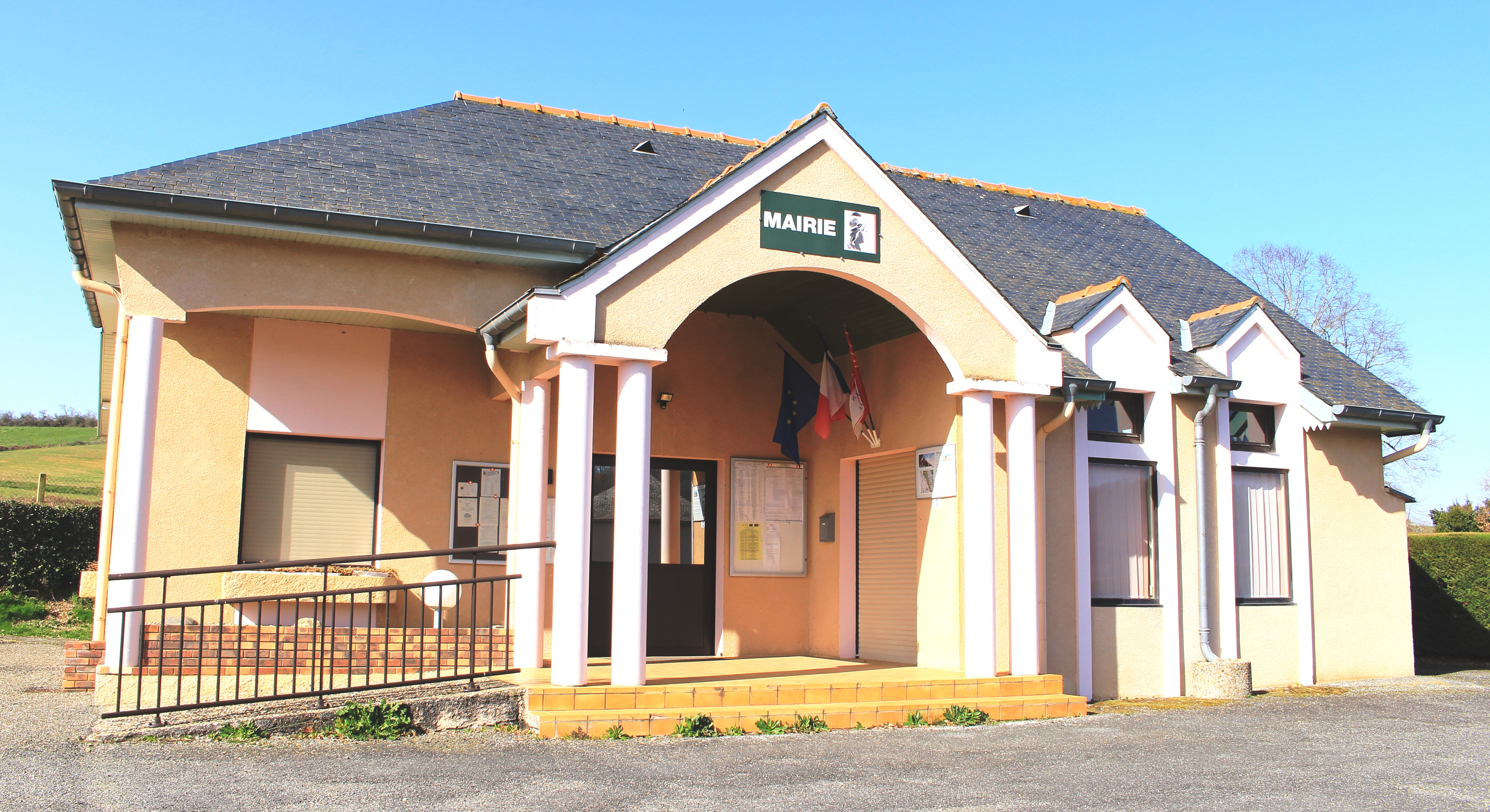
- Town hall

- Coat of arms
- Location of Moumoulous
- Location within France Location within Occitanie
- Coordinates: 43°21′38″N 0°14′33″E
- Country: France
- Region: Occitania
- Department: Hautes-Pyrénées
- Arrondissement: Tarbes
- Canton: Val d'Adour-Rustan-Madiranais
- Intercommunality: Adour Madiran
- Area^{1}: 3.36 km^{2} (1.30 sq mi)
- Elevation: 200 m (660 ft)
- Highest elevation: 321 m (1,053 ft)
- Lowest elevation: 205 m (673 ft)
- Population (2023): 45
  - Density: 13/km^{2} (35/sq mi)
- Time zone: UTC+01:00 (CET)
  - Summer (DST): UTC+02:00 (CEST)
- INSEE/Postal code: 65325 /65140
- ^{1} French Land Register data, which excludes lakes, ponds, glaciers > 1 km^{2} (0.386 sq mi or 247 acres) and river estuaries.

Moumoulous is a commune in the Hautes-Pyrénées department in south-western France.

== See also ==
- Communes of the Hautes-Pyrénées department
