= Saint-Lanne =

- Commune
- Coat of arms
- Location of Saint-Lanne
- Location within France Location within Occitanie
- Coordinates: 43°35′39″N 0°03′37″W
- Country: France
- Region: Occitania
- Department: Hautes-Pyrénées
- Arrondissement: Tarbes
- Canton: Val d'Adour-Rustan-Madiranais

Government
  - Mayor (2020–2026): Sandrine Santacreu
- Area^{1}: 13.1 km^{2} (5.1 sq mi)
- Elevation: 172 m (564 ft)
- Highest elevation: 243 m (797 ft)
- Lowest elevation: 118 m (387 ft)
- Population (2023): 119
  - Density: 9.08/km^{2} (23.5/sq mi)
- Time zone: UTC+01:00 (CET)
  - Summer (DST): UTC+02:00 (CEST)
- INSEE/Postal code: 65387 /65700
- ^{1} French Land Register data, which excludes lakes, ponds, glaciers > 1 km^{2} (0.386 sq mi or 247 acres) and river estuaries.

Saint-Lanne (French pronunciation: [sɛ̃ lan]; Occitan: Senlana) is a commune in the Hautes-Pyrénées department in south-western France.

== See also ==
- Communes of the Hautes-Pyrénées department
