= Canton of Val d'Adour-Rustan-Madiranais =

Coordinates: 43.47°N 0.03°E

The canton of Val d'Adour-Rustan-Madiranais is an administrative division of the Hautes-Pyrénées department, southwestern France. It was created at the French canton reorganisation which came into effect in March 2015. Its seat is in Maubourguet.

It consists of the following communes:

1. Ansost
2. Auriébat
3. Barbachen
4. Bazillac
5. Bouilh-Devant
6. Buzon
7. Castelnau-Rivière-Basse
8. Caussade-Rivière
9. Escondeaux
10. Estirac
11. Gensac
12. Hagedet
13. Hères
14. Labatut-Rivière
15. Lacassagne
16. Lafitole
17. Lahitte-Toupière
18. Laméac
19. Larreule
20. Lascazères
21. Lescurry
22. Liac
23. Madiran
24. Mansan
25. Maubourguet
26. Mingot
27. Monfaucon
28. Moumoulous
29. Peyrun
30. Rabastens-de-Bigorre
31. Saint-Lanne
32. Saint-Sever-de-Rustan
33. Sarriac-Bigorre
34. Sauveterre
35. Ségalas
36. Sénac
37. Sombrun
38. Soublecause
39. Tostat
40. Trouley-Labarthe
41. Ugnouas
42. Vidouze
43. Villefranque
