= Lascazères =

- Commune
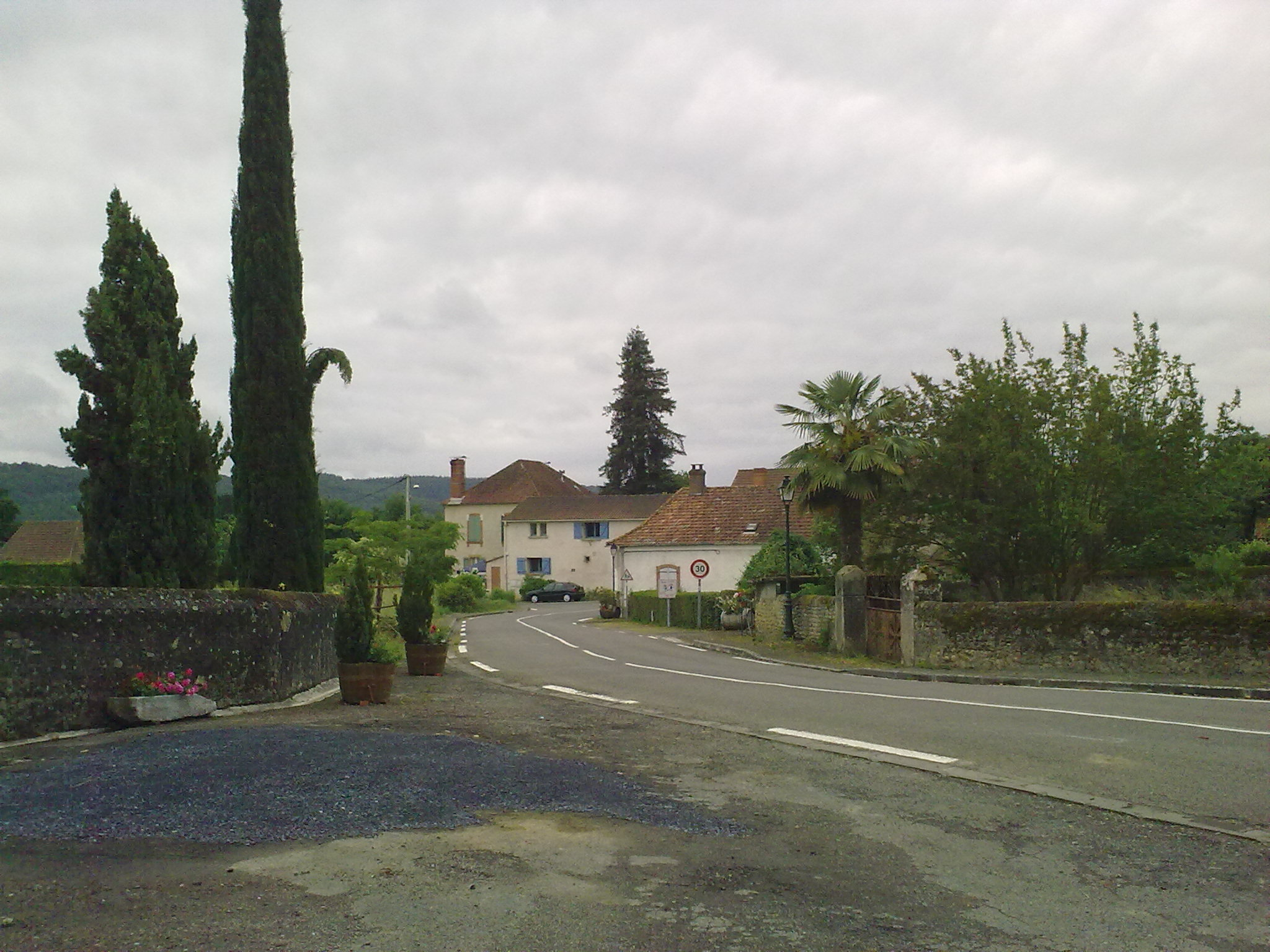
- A view of the village

- Coat of arms
- Location of Lascazères
- Location within France Location within Occitanie
- Coordinates: 43°30′27″N 0°01′30″W
- Country: France
- Region: Occitania
- Department: Hautes-Pyrénées
- Arrondissement: Tarbes
- Canton: Val d'Adour-Rustan-Madiranais
- Intercommunality: Adour Madiran

Government
  - Mayor (2020–2026): Christian Bourbon
- Area^{1}: 9.21 km^{2} (3.56 sq mi)
- Elevation: 200 m (660 ft)
- Highest elevation: 281 m (922 ft)
- Lowest elevation: 158 m (518 ft)
- Population (2023): 320
  - Density: 35/km^{2} (90/sq mi)
- Time zone: UTC+01:00 (CET)
  - Summer (DST): UTC+02:00 (CEST)
- INSEE/Postal code: 65264 /65700
- ^{1} French Land Register data, which excludes lakes, ponds, glaciers > 1 km^{2} (0.386 sq mi or 247 acres) and river estuaries.

Lascazères (French pronunciation: [laskazɛʁ]; Occitan: Lascasèras) is a commune in the Hautes-Pyrénées department in south-western France.

== See also ==
- Communes of the Hautes-Pyrénées department
