= Laméac =

- Commune
- Coat of arms
- Location of Laméac
- Location within France Location within Occitanie
- Coordinates: 43°19′59″N 0°13′41″E
- Country: France
- Region: Occitania
- Department: Hautes-Pyrénées
- Arrondissement: Tarbes
- Canton: Val d'Adour-Rustan-Madiranais
- Intercommunality: Adour Madiran

Government
  - Mayor (2020–2026): José Debat
- Area^{1}: 5.32 km^{2} (2.05 sq mi)
- Elevation: 196 m (643 ft)
- Highest elevation: 309 m (1,014 ft)
- Lowest elevation: 185 m (607 ft)
- Population (2023): 156
  - Density: 29.3/km^{2} (75.9/sq mi)
- Time zone: UTC+01:00 (CET)
  - Summer (DST): UTC+02:00 (CEST)
- INSEE/Postal code: 65254 /65140
- ^{1} French Land Register data, which excludes lakes, ponds, glaciers > 1 km^{2} (0.386 sq mi or 247 acres) and river estuaries.

Laméac (French pronunciation: [lameak]; Occitan: Hlamiac) is a commune in the Hautes-Pyrénées department in south-western France.

== See also ==
- Communes of the Hautes-Pyrénées department
