= Caussade-Rivière =

- Commune
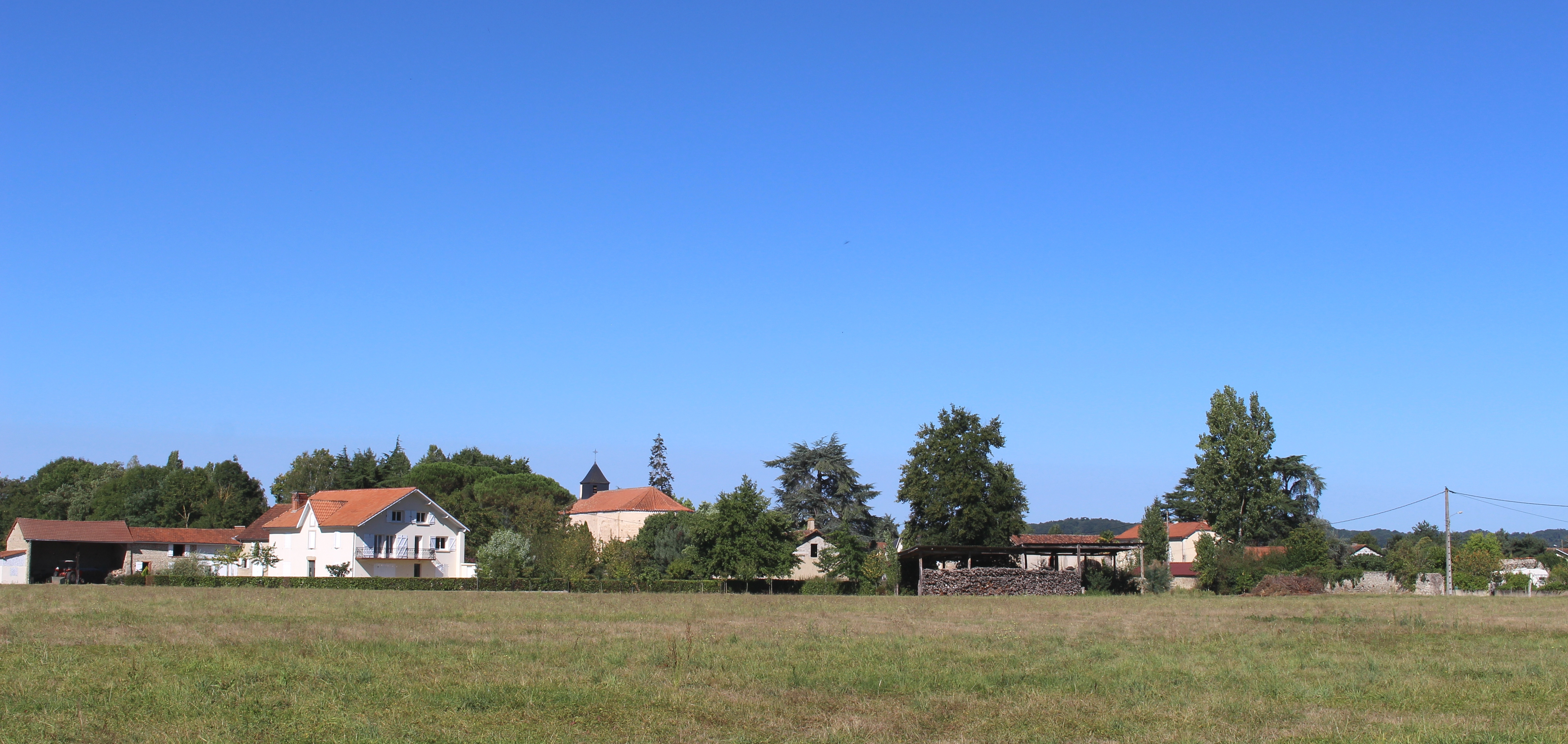
- View of Caussade-Rivière

- Coat of arms
- Location of Caussade-Rivière
- Location within France Location within Occitanie
- Coordinates: 43°30′57″N 0°01′07″E
- Country: France
- Region: Occitania
- Department: Hautes-Pyrénées
- Arrondissement: Tarbes
- Canton: Val d'Adour-Rustan-Madiranais
- Intercommunality: Adour Madiran

Government
  - Mayor (2020–2026): Geneviève Bory
- Area^{1}: 6.16 km^{2} (2.38 sq mi)
- Elevation: 159 m (522 ft)
- Highest elevation: 164 m (538 ft)
- Lowest elevation: 151 m (495 ft)
- Population (2023): 99
  - Density: 16/km^{2} (42/sq mi)
- Time zone: UTC+01:00 (CET)
  - Summer (DST): UTC+02:00 (CEST)
- INSEE/Postal code: 65137 /65700
- ^{1} French Land Register data, which excludes lakes, ponds, glaciers > 1 km^{2} (0.386 sq mi or 247 acres) and river estuaries.

Caussade-Rivière (French pronunciation: [kosad ʁivjɛʁ]; Occitan: Cauçada) is a commune in the Hautes-Pyrénées department in south-western France.

== See also ==
- Communes of the Hautes-Pyrénées department
