= Barthe =

- Commune
- Coat of arms
- Location of Barthe
- Location within France Location within Occitanie
- Coordinates: 43°17′01″N 0°28′14″E
- Country: France
- Region: Occitania
- Department: Hautes-Pyrénées
- Arrondissement: Tarbes
- Canton: Les Coteaux
- Intercommunality: Pays de Trie et Magnoac
- Area^{1}: 1.35 km^{2} (0.52 sq mi)
- Elevation: 340 m (1,120 ft)
- Highest elevation: 385 m (1,263 ft)
- Lowest elevation: 286 m (938 ft)
- Population (2023): 25
  - Density: 19/km^{2} (48/sq mi)
- Time zone: UTC+01:00 (CET)
  - Summer (DST): UTC+02:00 (CEST)
- INSEE/Postal code: 65068 /65230
- ^{1} French Land Register data, which excludes lakes, ponds, glaciers > 1 km^{2} (0.386 sq mi or 247 acres) and river estuaries.

Barthe (French pronunciation: [baʁt]; Occitan: Barta) is a commune in the Hautes-Pyrénées department in southwestern France.

== Population ==
Historical population
Year	Pop.	±% p.a.
1968	28	—
1975	25	−1.61%
1982	28	+1.63%
1990	23	−2.43%
1999	22	−0.49%
2007	16	−3.90%
2012	18	+2.38%
2017	18	+0.00%
2023	25	+5.63%
Source: INSEE

== See also ==
- Communes of the Hautes-Pyrénées department
