= Sarriac-Bigorre =

- Commune
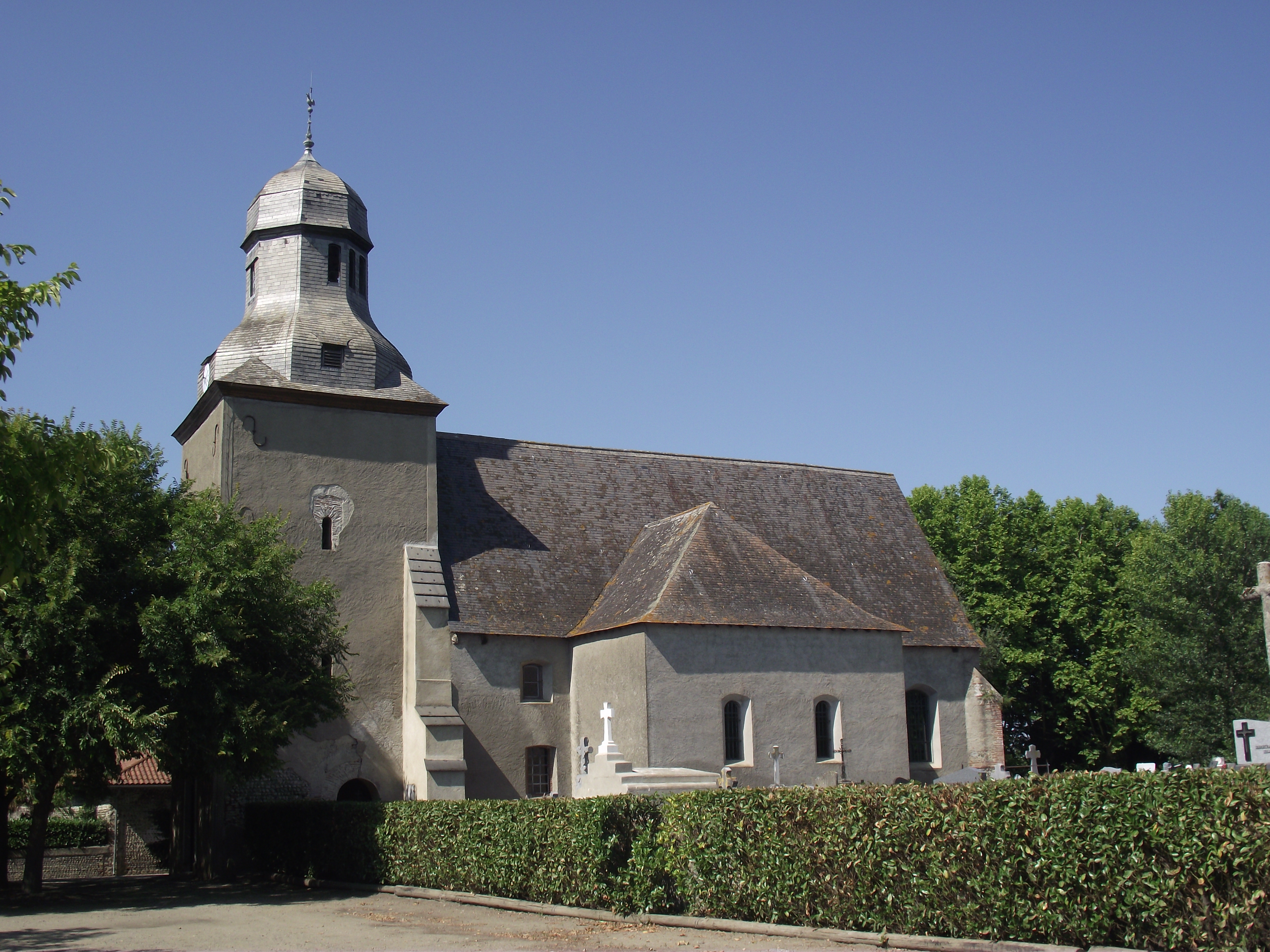
- The church of Sarriac-Bigorre

- Coat of arms
- Location of Sarriac-Bigorre
- Location within France Location within Occitanie
- Coordinates: 43°23′01″N 0°07′42″E
- Country: France
- Region: Occitania
- Department: Hautes-Pyrénées
- Arrondissement: Tarbes
- Canton: Val d'Adour-Rustan-Madiranais
- Intercommunality: Adour Madiran

Government
  - Mayor (2020–2026): Denis Gronnier
- Area^{1}: 10.8 km^{2} (4.2 sq mi)
- Elevation: 215 m (705 ft)
- Highest elevation: 225 m (738 ft)
- Lowest elevation: 209 m (686 ft)
- Population (2023): 271
  - Density: 25.1/km^{2} (65.0/sq mi)
- Time zone: UTC+01:00 (CET)
  - Summer (DST): UTC+02:00 (CEST)
- INSEE/Postal code: 65409 /65140
- ^{1} French Land Register data, which excludes lakes, ponds, glaciers > 1 km^{2} (0.386 sq mi or 247 acres) and river estuaries.

Sarriac-Bigorre (French pronunciation: [saʁjak bigɔʁ]; Occitan: Sarriac) is a commune in the Hautes-Pyrénées department in southwestern France.

== See also ==
- Communes of the Hautes-Pyrénées department
