= Trouley-Labarthe =

- Commune
- Coat of arms
- Location of Trouley-Labarthe
- Location within France Location within Occitanie
- Coordinates: 43°19′02″N 0°14′31″E
- Country: France
- Region: Occitania
- Department: Hautes-Pyrénées
- Arrondissement: Tarbes
- Canton: Val d'Adour-Rustan-Madiranais
- Intercommunality: Adour Madiran

Government
  - Mayor (2020–2026): Martine Betbèze
- Area^{1}: 4.39 km^{2} (1.69 sq mi)
- Elevation: 245 m (804 ft)
- Highest elevation: 380 m (1,250 ft)
- Lowest elevation: 201 m (659 ft)
- Population (2023): 100
  - Density: 23/km^{2} (59/sq mi)
- Time zone: UTC+01:00 (CET)
  - Summer (DST): UTC+02:00 (CEST)
- INSEE/Postal code: 65454 /65140
- ^{1} French Land Register data, which excludes lakes, ponds, glaciers > 1 km^{2} (0.386 sq mi or 247 acres) and river estuaries.

Trouley-Labarthe (French pronunciation: [tʁulɛ labaʁt]; Occitan: Trolei e la Barta) is a commune in the Hautes-Pyrénées department in south-western France.

== See also ==
- Communes of the Hautes-Pyrénées department
