= Sombrun =

- Commune
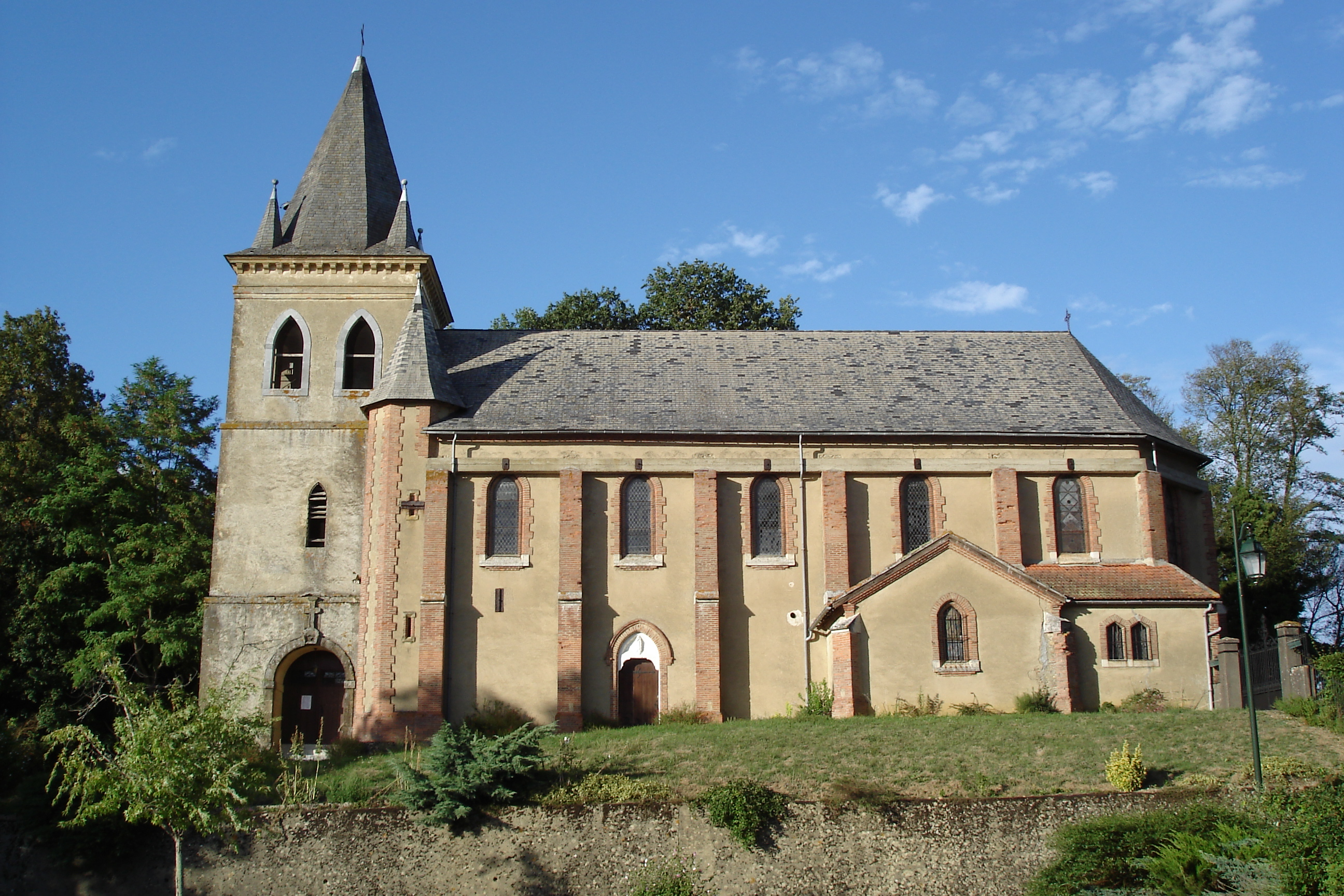
- The church of Sombrun

- Coat of arms
- Location of Sombrun
- Location within France Location within Occitanie
- Coordinates: 43°28′47″N 0°00′28″E
- Country: France
- Region: Occitania
- Department: Hautes-Pyrénées
- Arrondissement: Tarbes
- Canton: Val d'Adour-Rustan-Madiranais
- Intercommunality: Adour Madiran

Government
  - Mayor (2020–2026): Gérard Dieuzeide
- Area^{1}: 9.67 km^{2} (3.73 sq mi)
- Elevation: 160 m (520 ft)
- Highest elevation: 291 m (955 ft)
- Lowest elevation: 164 m (538 ft)
- Population (2023): 194
  - Density: 20.1/km^{2} (52.0/sq mi)
- Time zone: UTC+01:00 (CET)
  - Summer (DST): UTC+02:00 (CEST)
- INSEE/Postal code: 65429 /65700
- ^{1} French Land Register data, which excludes lakes, ponds, glaciers > 1 km^{2} (0.386 sq mi or 247 acres) and river estuaries.

Sombrun (French pronunciation: [sɔ̃bʁœ̃]) is a commune in the Hautes-Pyrénées department in south-western France.

== See also ==
- Communes of the Hautes-Pyrénées department
