= Hères =

Hères Èras (Occitan)
- Commune
- Coat of arms
- Location of Hères
- Location within France Location within Occitanie
- Coordinates: 43°33′14″N 0°00′02″E
- Country: France
- Region: Occitania
- Department: Hautes-Pyrénées
- Arrondissement: Tarbes
- Canton: Val d'Adour-Rustan-Madiranais

Government
  - Mayor (2020–2026): Jacques Duffau
- Area^{1}: 5.89 km^{2} (2.27 sq mi)
- Elevation: 148 m (486 ft)
- Highest elevation: 244 m (801 ft)
- Lowest elevation: 141 m (463 ft)
- Population (2023): 96
  - Density: 16/km^{2} (42/sq mi)
- Time zone: UTC+01:00 (CET)
  - Summer (DST): UTC+02:00 (CEST)
- INSEE/Postal code: 65219 /65700
- ^{1} French Land Register data, which excludes lakes, ponds, glaciers > 1 km^{2} (0.386 sq mi or 247 acres) and river estuaries.

Hères (French: [ɛʁ]; Occitan: Èras) is a commune in the Hautes-Pyrénées department in south-western France.

== See also ==
- Communes of the Hautes-Pyrénées department
