= Estirac =

- Commune
- Coat of arms
- Location of Estirac
- Location within France Location within Occitanie
- Coordinates: 43°29′51″N 0°01′57″E
- Country: France
- Region: Occitania
- Department: Hautes-Pyrénées
- Arrondissement: Tarbes
- Canton: Val d'Adour-Rustan-Madiranais
- Intercommunality: Adour Madiran
- Area^{1}: 5.21 km^{2} (2.01 sq mi)
- Elevation: 163 m (535 ft)
- Highest elevation: 169 m (554 ft)
- Lowest elevation: 158 m (518 ft)
- Population (2023): 104
  - Density: 20.0/km^{2} (51.7/sq mi)
- Time zone: UTC+01:00 (CET)
  - Summer (DST): UTC+02:00 (CEST)
- INSEE/Postal code: 65174 /65700
- ^{1} French Land Register data, which excludes lakes, ponds, glaciers > 1 km^{2} (0.386 sq mi or 247 acres) and river estuaries.

Estirac (French pronunciation: [ɛstiʁak]) is a commune in the Hautes-Pyrénées department in south-western France.

== See also ==
- Communes of the Hautes-Pyrénées department
