= Gensac, Hautes-Pyrénées =

Gensac
- Commune
- Coat of arms
- Location of Gensac
- Location within France Location within Occitanie
- Coordinates: 43°25′58″N 0°05′06″E
- Country: France
- Region: Occitania
- Department: Hautes-Pyrénées
- Arrondissement: Tarbes
- Canton: Val d'Adour-Rustan-Madiranais
- Intercommunality: Adour Madiran
- Area^{1}: 3.44 km^{2} (1.33 sq mi)
- Elevation: 197 m (646 ft)
- Highest elevation: 201 m (659 ft)
- Lowest elevation: 190 m (620 ft)
- Population (2023): 86
  - Density: 25/km^{2} (65/sq mi)
- Time zone: UTC+01:00 (CET)
  - Summer (DST): UTC+02:00 (CEST)
- INSEE/Postal code: 65196 /65140
- ^{1} French Land Register data, which excludes lakes, ponds, glaciers > 1 km^{2} (0.386 sq mi or 247 acres) and river estuaries.

Gensac is a commune in the Hautes-Pyrénées department in south-western France.

== See also ==
- Communes of the Hautes-Pyrénées department
