= Auriébat =

- Commune
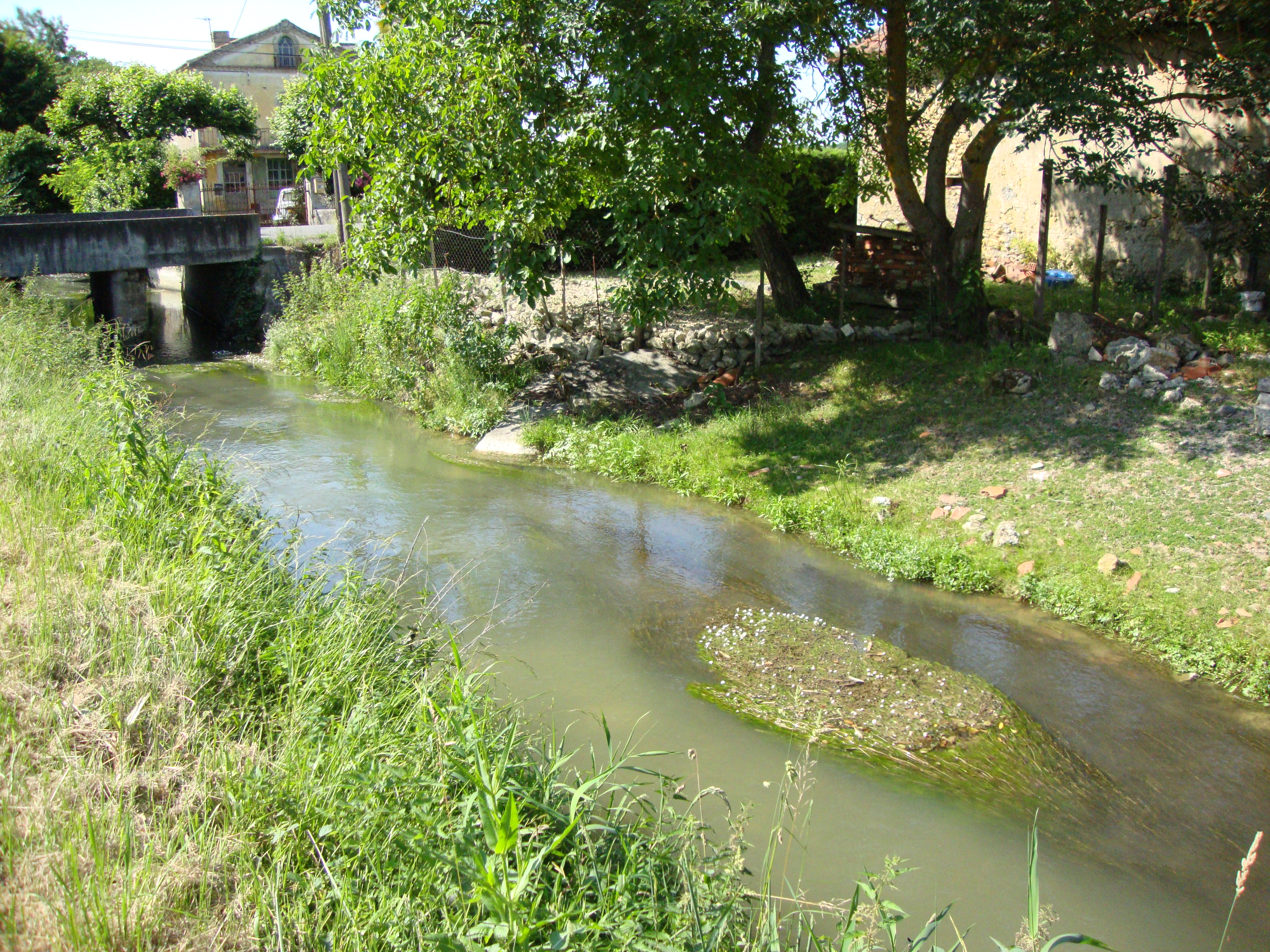
- The Canal d'Alaric

- Coat of arms
- Location of Auriébat
- Location within France Location within Occitanie
- Coordinates: 43°29′44″N 0°05′18″E
- Country: France
- Region: Occitania
- Department: Hautes-Pyrénées
- Arrondissement: Tarbes
- Canton: Val d'Adour-Rustan-Madiranais
- Intercommunality: CC Adour Madiran

Government
  - Mayor (2020–2026): Bernard Laquay
- Area^{1}: 16.12 km^{2} (6.22 sq mi)
- Elevation: 240 m (790 ft)
- Highest elevation: 262 m (860 ft)
- Lowest elevation: 144 m (472 ft)
- Population (2023): 241
  - Density: 15.0/km^{2} (38.7/sq mi)
- Time zone: UTC+01:00 (CET)
  - Summer (DST): UTC+02:00 (CEST)
- INSEE/Postal code: 65049 /65700
- ^{1} French Land Register data, which excludes lakes, ponds, glaciers > 1 km^{2} (0.386 sq mi or 247 acres) and river estuaries.

Auriébat (French pronunciation: [oʁjeba]; Occitan: Auriavath) is a commune in the Hautes-Pyrénées department in southwestern France.

== Population ==
Historical population
Year	Pop.	±% p.a.
1968	312	—
1975	262	−2.46%
1982	270	+0.43%
1990	257	−0.61%
1999	290	+1.35%
2007	295	+0.21%
2012	274	−1.47%
2017	246	−2.13%
2023	241	−0.34%
Source: INSEE

== See also ==
- Communes of the Hautes-Pyrénées department
