= Sauveterre, Hautes-Pyrénées =

Sauveterre
- Commune
- Coat of arms
- Location of Sauveterre
- Location within France Location within Occitanie
- Coordinates: 43°28′32″N 0°06′28″E
- Country: France
- Region: Occitania
- Department: Hautes-Pyrénées
- Arrondissement: Tarbes
- Canton: Val d'Adour-Rustan-Madiranais
- Intercommunality: Adour Madiran

Government
  - Mayor (2020–2026): Philippe Pirotte
- Area^{1}: 10.38 km^{2} (4.01 sq mi)
- Elevation: 226 m (741 ft)
- Highest elevation: 246 m (807 ft)
- Lowest elevation: 151 m (495 ft)
- Population (2023): 157
  - Density: 15.1/km^{2} (39.2/sq mi)
- Time zone: UTC+01:00 (CET)
  - Summer (DST): UTC+02:00 (CEST)
- INSEE/Postal code: 65412 /65700
- ^{1} French Land Register data, which excludes lakes, ponds, glaciers > 1 km^{2} (0.386 sq mi or 247 acres) and river estuaries.

Sauveterre (French pronunciation: [sovtɛʁ]; Occitan: Sauvatèrra) is a commune in the Hautes-Pyrénées department in south-western France.

== See also ==
- Communes of the Hautes-Pyrénées department
