= Villefranque, Hautes-Pyrénées =

Villefranque
- Commune
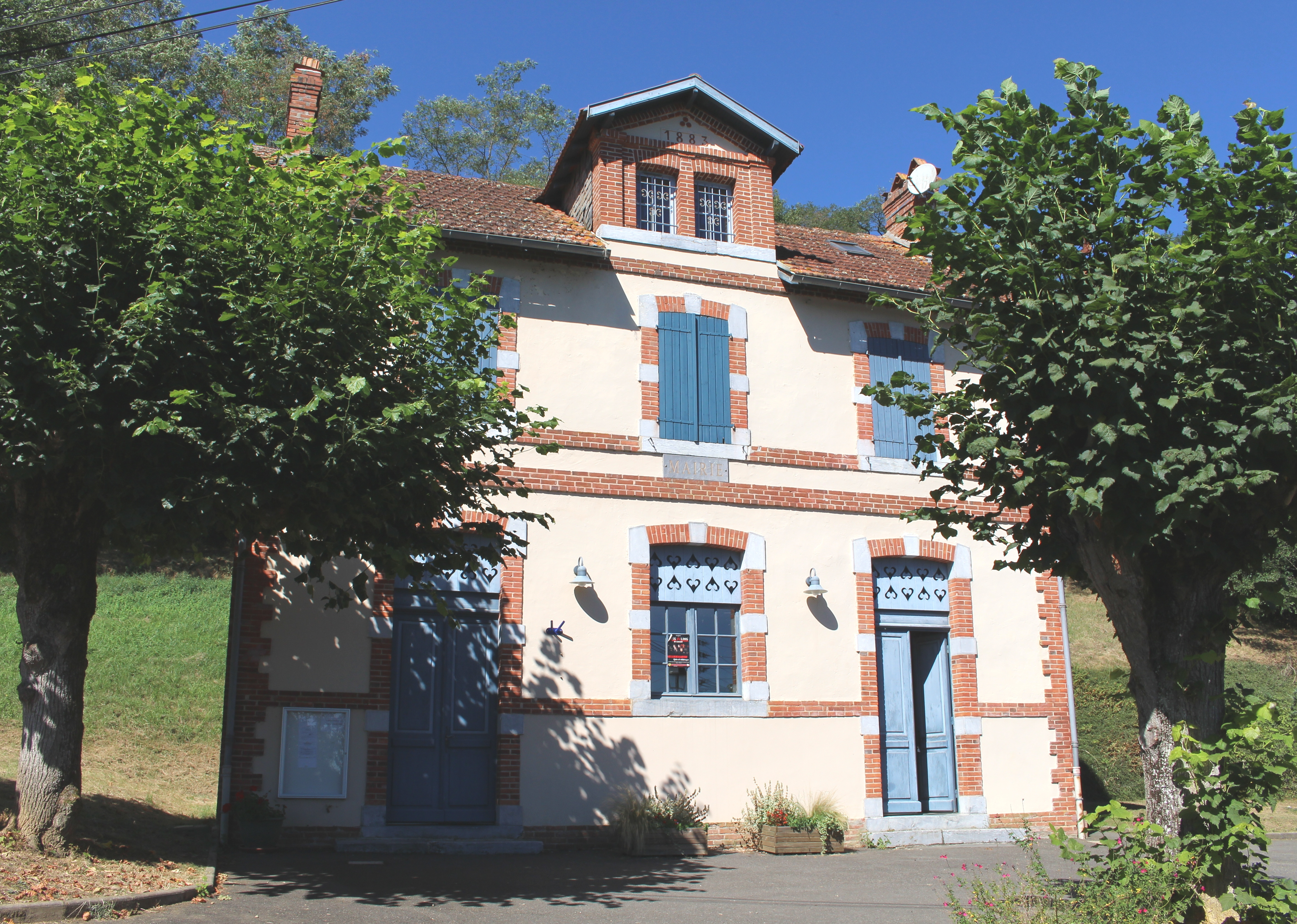
- Villefranque Town hall

- Coat of arms
- Location of Villefranque
- Location within France Location within Occitanie
- Coordinates: 43°30′03″N 0°00′15″W
- Country: France
- Region: Occitania
- Department: Hautes-Pyrénées
- Arrondissement: Tarbes
- Canton: Val d'Adour-Rustan-Madiranais
- Intercommunality: Adour Madiran

Government
  - Mayor (2020–2026): Nelly Laurent
- Area^{1}: 3.17 km^{2} (1.22 sq mi)
- Elevation: 162 m (531 ft)
- Highest elevation: 280 m (920 ft)
- Lowest elevation: 157 m (515 ft)
- Population (2023): 74
  - Density: 23/km^{2} (60/sq mi)
- Time zone: UTC+01:00 (CET)
  - Summer (DST): UTC+02:00 (CEST)
- INSEE/Postal code: 65472 /65700
- ^{1} French Land Register data, which excludes lakes, ponds, glaciers > 1 km^{2} (0.386 sq mi or 247 acres) and river estuaries.

Villefranque (French pronunciation: [vilfʁɑ̃k]; Occitan: Vilafranca) is a commune in the Hautes-Pyrénées department in south-western France.

== See also ==
- Communes of the Hautes-Pyrénées department
