= Buzon, Hautes-Pyrénées =

Buzon
- Commune
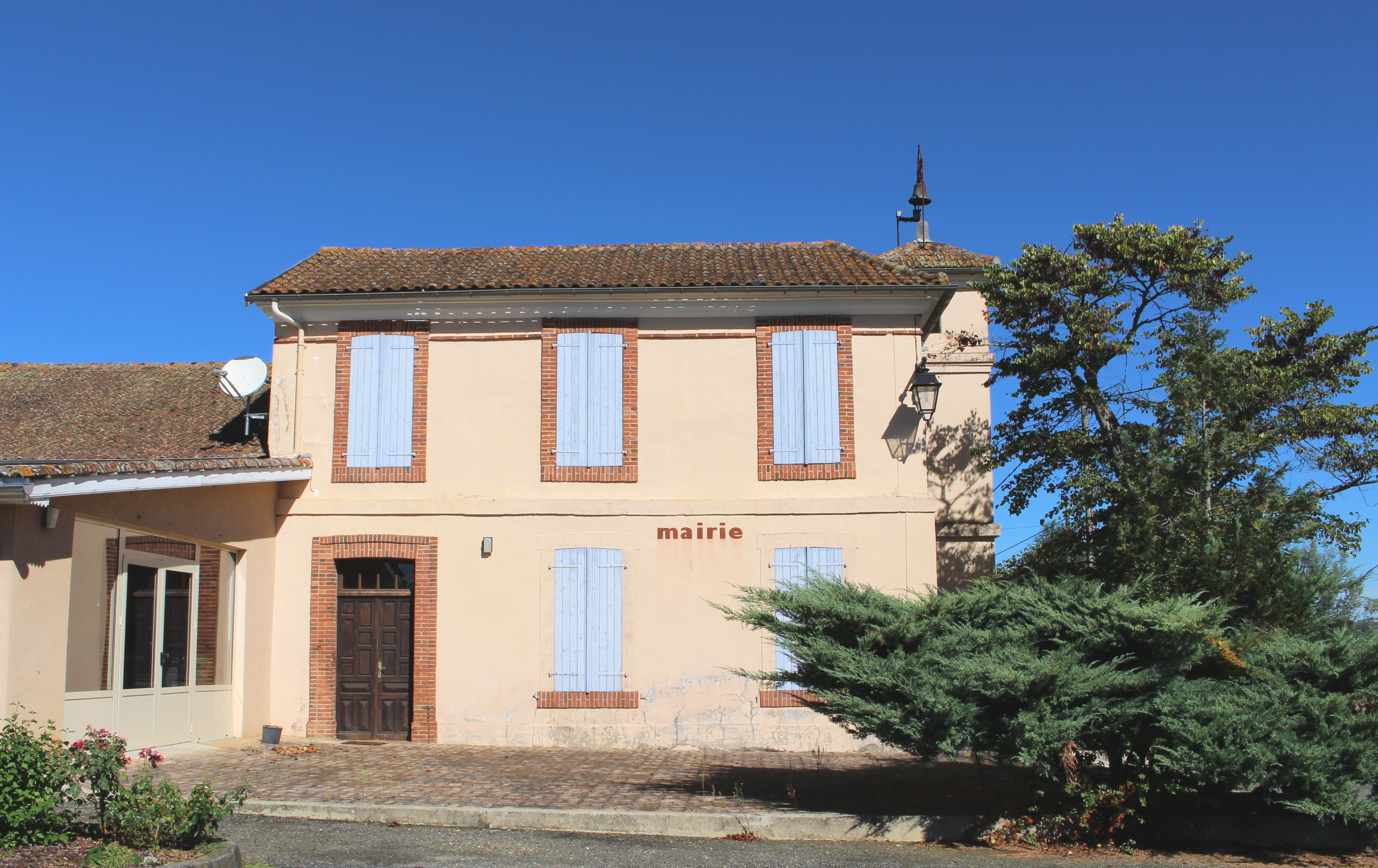
- Town hall of Buzon

- Coat of arms
- Location of Buzon
- Location within France Location within Occitanie
- Coordinates: 43°26′42″N 0°08′35″E
- Country: France
- Region: Occitania
- Department: Hautes-Pyrénées
- Arrondissement: Tarbes
- Canton: Val d'Adour-Rustan-Madiranais

Government
  - Mayor (2022–2026): Martine Blanconnier
- Area^{1}: 4.4 km^{2} (1.7 sq mi)
- Elevation: 143 m (469 ft)
- Highest elevation: 260 m (850 ft)
- Lowest elevation: 156 m (512 ft)
- Population (2023): 79
  - Density: 18/km^{2} (47/sq mi)
- Time zone: UTC+01:00 (CET)
  - Summer (DST): UTC+02:00 (CEST)
- INSEE/Postal code: 65114 /65140
- ^{1} French Land Register data, which excludes lakes, ponds, glaciers > 1 km^{2} (0.386 sq mi or 247 acres) and river estuaries.

Buzon (French pronunciation: [byzɔ̃]; Occitan: Buson) is a commune in the Hautes-Pyrénées department in southwestern France.

== Population ==
Historical population
Year	Pop.	±% p.a.
1968	77	—
1975	72	−0.95%
1982	85	+2.40%
1990	70	−2.40%
1999	74	+0.62%
2007	77	+0.50%
2012	86	+2.24%
2017	78	−1.93%
2023	79	+0.21%
Source: INSEE

== See also ==
- Communes of the Hautes-Pyrénées department
- Hautes-Pyrénées
