= Rabastens-de-Bigorre =

- Commune
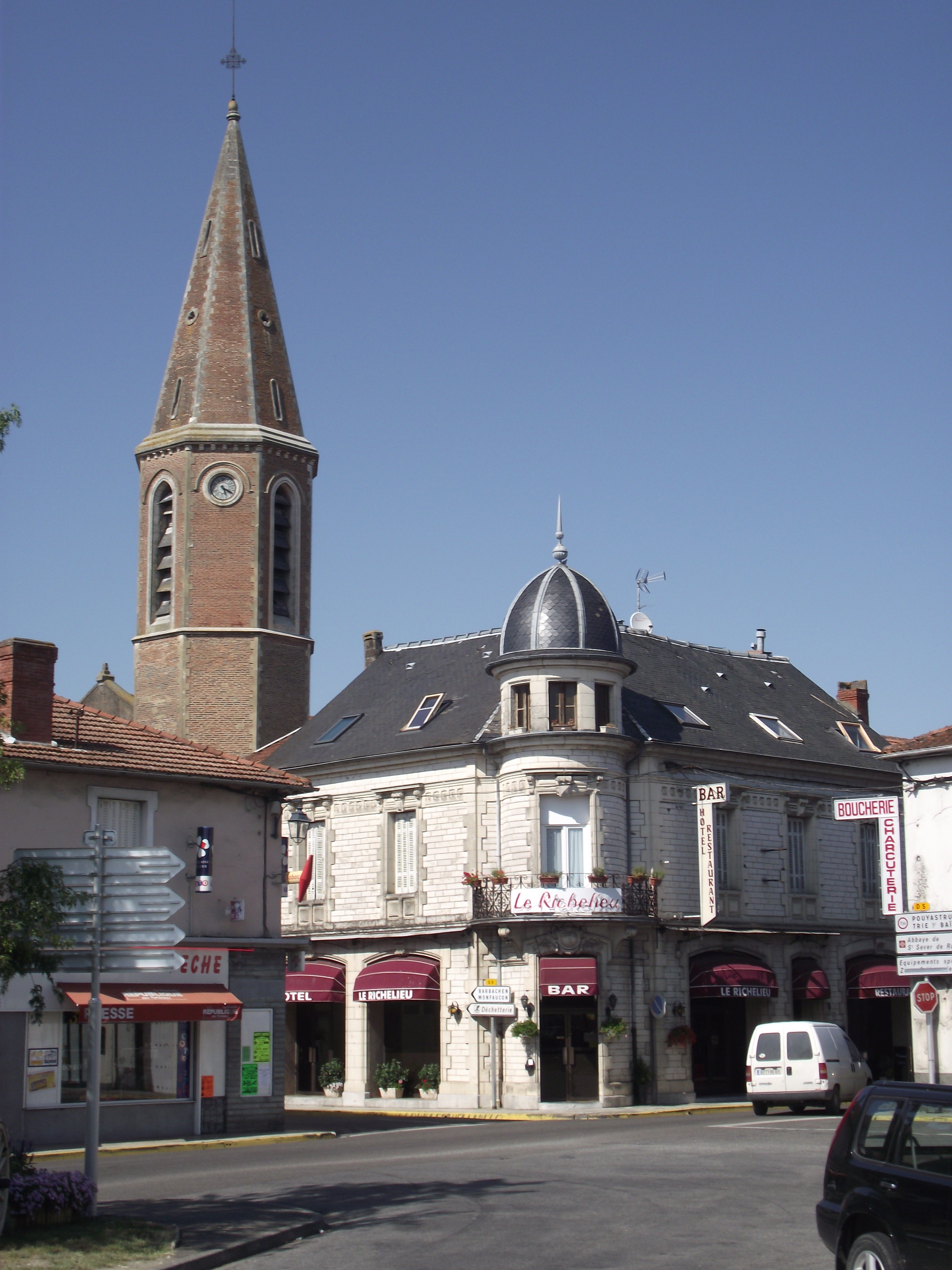
- The bell tower of the church of Saint-Louis and the hotel Le Richelieu

- Coat of arms
- Location of Rabastens-de-Bigorre
- Location within France Location within Occitanie
- Coordinates: 43°23′16″N 0°09′05″E
- Country: France
- Region: Occitania
- Department: Hautes-Pyrénées
- Arrondissement: Tarbes
- Canton: Val d'Adour-Rustan-Madiranais
- Intercommunality: Adour Madiran

Government
  - Mayor (2020–2026): Véronique Thirault
- Area^{1}: 8.93 km^{2} (3.45 sq mi)
- Highest elevation: 280 m (920 ft)
- Lowest elevation: 191 m (627 ft)
- Population (2023): 1,483
  - Density: 166/km^{2} (430/sq mi)
- Time zone: UTC+01:00 (CET)
  - Summer (DST): UTC+02:00 (CEST)
- INSEE/Postal code: 65375 /65140
- ^{1} French Land Register data, which excludes lakes, ponds, glaciers > 1 km^{2} (0.386 sq mi or 247 acres) and river estuaries.

Rabastens-de-Bigorre (French pronunciation: [ʁabastɛ̃s də biɡɔʁ]; Occitan: Rabastens de Bigòrra, before 1962: Rabastens) is a commune in the Hautes-Pyrénées department in south-western France.

== Population ==
Historical population
| Year | Pop. | ±% p.a. |
|---|---|---|
| 1968 | 1,083 | — |
| 1975 | 1,082 | −0.01% |
| 1982 | 1,299 | +2.65% |
| 1990 | 1,284 | −0.15% |
| 1999 | 1,336 | +0.44% |
| 2007 | 1,406 | +0.64% |
| 2012 | 1,465 | +0.83% |
| 2017 | 1,453 | −0.16% |
| 2023 | 1,483 | +0.34% |
Source: INSEE

== See also ==
- Communes of the Hautes-Pyrénées department
