= Lahitte-Toupière =

- Commune
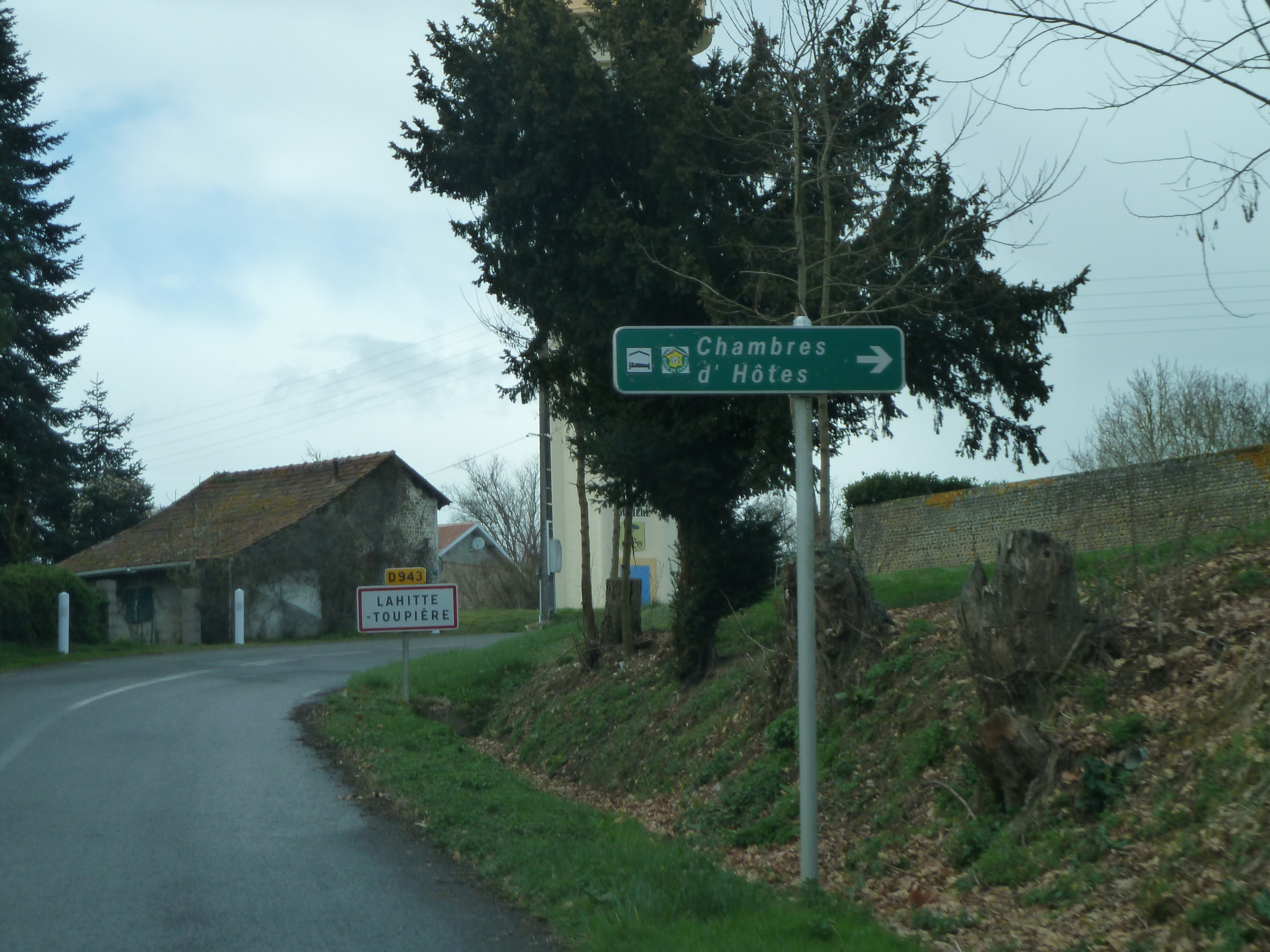
- The road into Lahitte-Toupière

- Coat of arms
- Location of Lahitte-Toupière
- Location within France Location within Occitanie
- Coordinates: 43°27′24″N 0°01′05″W
- Country: France
- Region: Occitania
- Department: Hautes-Pyrénées
- Arrondissement: Tarbes
- Canton: Val d'Adour-Rustan-Madiranais
- Intercommunality: Adour Madiran

Government
  - Mayor (2020–2026): Frédéric Ré
- Area^{1}: 5.6 km^{2} (2.2 sq mi)
- Elevation: 299 m (981 ft)
- Highest elevation: 301 m (988 ft)
- Lowest elevation: 175 m (574 ft)
- Population (2023): 263
  - Density: 47/km^{2} (120/sq mi)
- Time zone: UTC+01:00 (CET)
  - Summer (DST): UTC+02:00 (CEST)
- INSEE/Postal code: 65248 /65700
- ^{1} French Land Register data, which excludes lakes, ponds, glaciers > 1 km^{2} (0.386 sq mi or 247 acres) and river estuaries.

Lahitte-Toupière (French pronunciation: [la.it tupjɛʁ]; Occitan: La Hita Topièra) is a commune in the Hautes-Pyrénées department in south-western France.

== See also ==
- Communes of the Hautes-Pyrénées department
