= Villers-Buzon =

- Commune
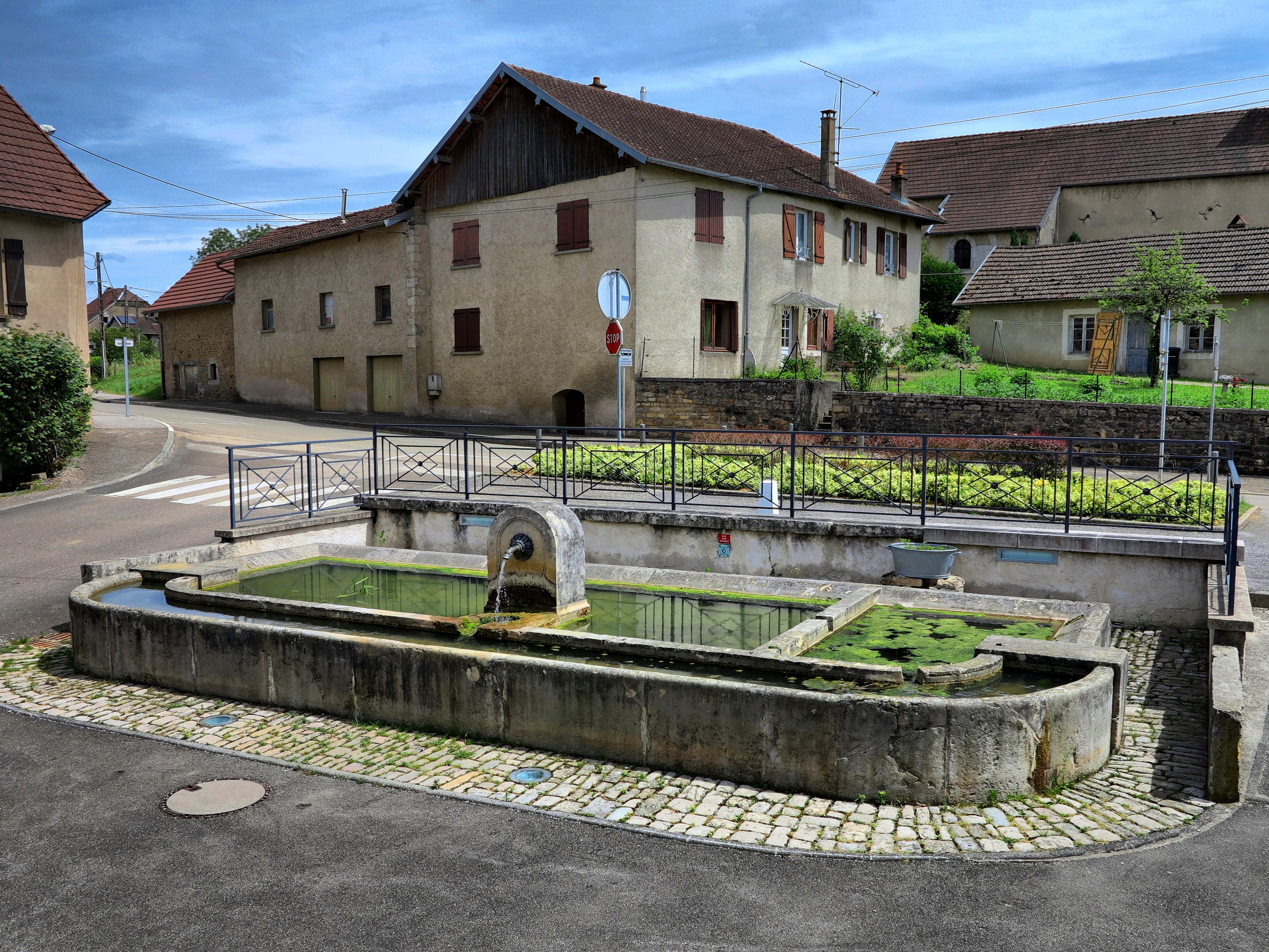
- The water trough in Villers-Buzon

- Coat of arms
- Location of Villers-Buzon
- Location within France Location within Bourgogne-Franche-Comté
- Coordinates: 47°13′42″N 5°51′08″E
- Country: France
- Region: Bourgogne-Franche-Comté
- Department: Doubs
- Arrondissement: Besançon
- Canton: Saint-Vit

Government
  - Mayor (2020–2026): Boris Doubey
- Area^{1}: 3.19 km^{2} (1.23 sq mi)
- Highest elevation: 295 m (968 ft)
- Lowest elevation: 227 m (745 ft)
- Population (2023): 312
  - Density: 97.8/km^{2} (253/sq mi)
- Time zone: UTC+01:00 (CET)
  - Summer (DST): UTC+02:00 (CEST)
- INSEE/Postal code: 25622 /25170
- ^{1} French Land Register data, which excludes lakes, ponds, glaciers > 1 km^{2} (0.386 sq mi or 247 acres) and river estuaries.

Villers-Buzon (French pronunciation: [vilɛʁ byzɔ̃]) is a commune in the Doubs department in the Bourgogne-Franche-Comté region in eastern France.

== Population ==
Historical population
Year	Pop.	±% p.a.
1968	77	—
1975	109	+5.09%
1982	169	+6.47%
1990	240	+4.48%
1999	236	−0.19%
2007	257	+1.07%
2012	256	−0.08%
2017	259	+0.23%
2023	312	+3.15%
Source: INSEE

== See also ==
- Communes of the Doubs department
