= Nouilhan =

- Commune
- Coat of arms
- Location of Nouilhan
- Location within France Location within Occitanie
- Coordinates: 43°25′28″N 0°02′22″E
- Country: France
- Region: Occitania
- Department: Hautes-Pyrénées
- Arrondissement: Tarbes
- Canton: Vic-en-Bigorre
- Intercommunality: Adour Madiran

Government
  - Mayor (2020–2026): Nathalie Iturria
- Area^{1}: 4.53 km^{2} (1.75 sq mi)
- Elevation: 197 m (646 ft)
- Highest elevation: 203 m (666 ft)
- Lowest elevation: 188 m (617 ft)
- Population (2023): 231
  - Density: 51.0/km^{2} (132/sq mi)
- Time zone: UTC+01:00 (CET)
  - Summer (DST): UTC+02:00 (CEST)
- INSEE/Postal code: 65330 /65500
- ^{1} French Land Register data, which excludes lakes, ponds, glaciers > 1 km^{2} (0.386 sq mi or 247 acres) and river estuaries.

Nouilhan (French pronunciation: [nujɑ̃]; Occitan: Nolhan) is a commune in the Hautes-Pyrénées department in south-western France.

== See also ==
- Communes of the Hautes-Pyrénées department
