= Lafitole =

- Commune
- Coat of arms
- Location of Lafitole
- Location within France Location within Occitanie
- Coordinates: 43°26′56″N 0°04′26″E
- Country: France
- Region: Occitania
- Department: Hautes-Pyrénées
- Arrondissement: Tarbes
- Canton: Val d'Adour-Rustan-Madiranais
- Intercommunality: Adour Madiran

Government
  - Mayor (2020–2026): Loïc Guesdon
- Area^{1}: 8.69 km^{2} (3.36 sq mi)
- Elevation: 232 m (761 ft)
- Highest elevation: 239 m (784 ft)
- Lowest elevation: 180 m (590 ft)
- Population (2023): 433
  - Density: 49.8/km^{2} (129/sq mi)
- Time zone: UTC+01:00 (CET)
  - Summer (DST): UTC+02:00 (CEST)
- INSEE/Postal code: 65243 /65700
- ^{1} French Land Register data, which excludes lakes, ponds, glaciers > 1 km^{2} (0.386 sq mi or 247 acres) and river estuaries.

Lafitole (French pronunciation: [lafitɔl]; Occitan: La Fitòla) is a commune in the Hautes-Pyrénées department in south-western France.

== See also ==
- Communes of the Hautes-Pyrénées department
