= Larreule, Hautes-Pyrénées =

Larreule
- Commune
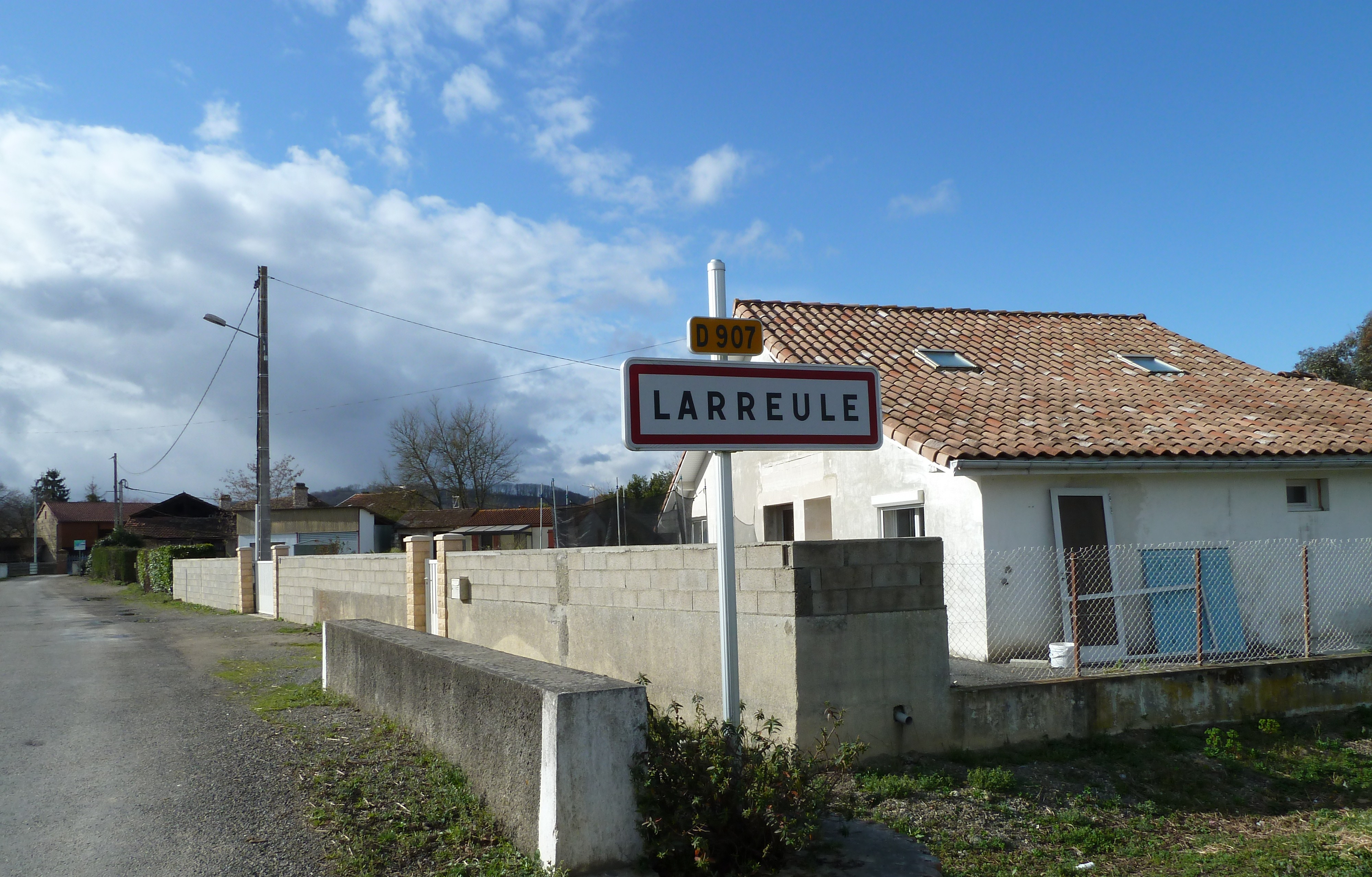
- The road into Larreule
- Location of Larreule
- Location within France Location within Occitanie
- Coordinates: 43°26′47″N 0°01′01″E
- Country: France
- Region: Occitania
- Department: Hautes-Pyrénées
- Arrondissement: Tarbes
- Canton: Val d'Adour-Rustan-Madiranais
- Intercommunality: Adour Madiran

Government
  - Mayor (2020–2026): Maurice Dussollier
- Area^{1}: 10.14 km^{2} (3.92 sq mi)
- Elevation: 183 m (600 ft)
- Highest elevation: 307 m (1,007 ft)
- Lowest elevation: 177 m (581 ft)
- Population (2023): 379
  - Density: 37.4/km^{2} (96.8/sq mi)
- Time zone: UTC+01:00 (CET)
  - Summer (DST): UTC+02:00 (CEST)
- INSEE/Postal code: 65262 /65700
- ^{1} French Land Register data, which excludes lakes, ponds, glaciers > 1 km^{2} (0.386 sq mi or 247 acres) and river estuaries.

Larreule (French pronunciation: [laʁœl]; Occitan: La Reula) is a commune in the Hautes-Pyrénées department in southwestern France.

== See also ==
- Communes of the Hautes-Pyrénées department
