= Lac de l'Astarac =

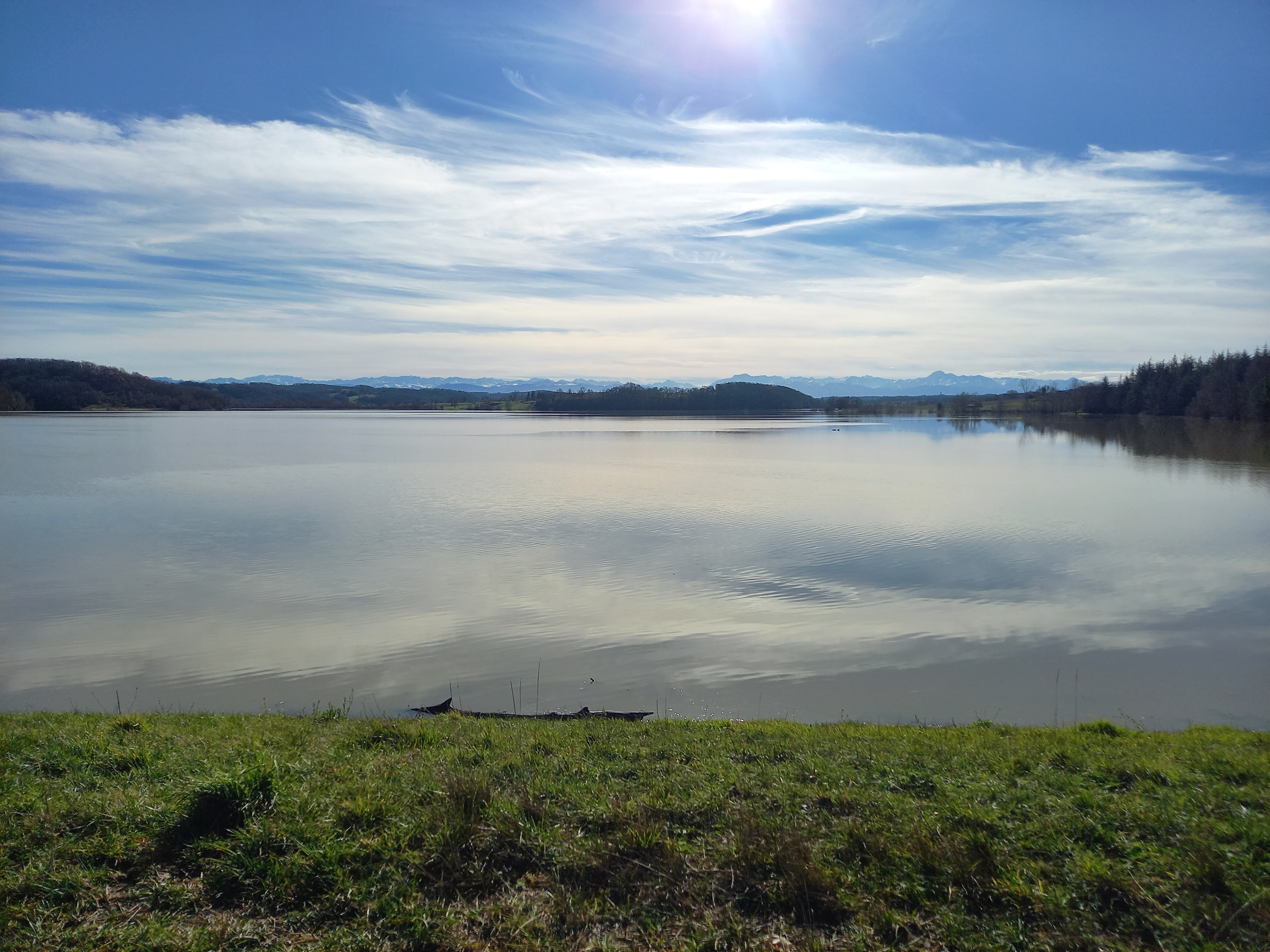
- Astarac Reservoir, seen from the dike.

- Location of Lac de l'Astarac (Occitanie region)
- Interactive map of Lac de l'Astarac
- Location: Gers, Occitanie, France
- Coordinates: 43°22′59″N 0°37′57″E
- Type: Reservoir
- Primary inflows: Arrats; Petit Arrats
- Surface area: 1.8 km^{2} (0.69 mi^{2})
- Average depth: 13 m (43 ft)
- Water volume: 10,000,000 m^{3} (350,000,000 ft^{3})
- Settlements: Aussos; Bézues-Bajon

Lac de l'Astarac, or Astarac reservoir, is a French reservoir in the Gers department, Occitania region of France, managed by the government department of CACG.

== Geography ==
Lac de l'Astarac covers two communes, Aussos and Bézues-Bajon. Its waters are held back by a dam stretching across the Arrats valley.

The lake is unusual in that it stretches over two valleys, the Petit Arrats river valley on the east fork and the Arrats river valley on the west bank, separated by a hillside that ends about 1 km (0.62 mi) from the dam. The lake is thus shaped like a Y. The lake is bounded on the east by a wooded hillside and on the west by the D40 (Route de l'Arrats).

== History ==
The dam was built in 1976, to collect rainwater and water from the Pyrenees for agricultural use during the dry summers that are common in this area beyond the Lannemezan plateau.

== Description ==
The existence of this lake is due to an embankment dam, very common in the area. It spans the Arrats valley, and has a spillway on the east side of the dam to evacuate excess water. With a surface area of 171 ha, the reservoir has a capacity of 10,000,000 cubic metres (350,000,000 cu ft). It is managed by the CACG (Compagnie d'Aménagement des Coteaux de Gascogne).

Water is supplied by rainwater and by the Arrats and Petite Arrats rivers. The former, unlike the latter, is fed by the Neste canal[fr], which contributes all year round to the river's low-water level. The lake is thus part of the Neste hydraulic system, also managed by the CACG.

== Environmental protection ==
The Astarac lake and the Arrats hillside are listed as ZNIEFF type 1.

Recently, the Lac de l'Astarac was included in the Natura 2000 network of the Lauze[fr] valleys and hillsides, further protecting the flora and fauna of the area.

== Local Species ==
=== Ornithology ===
Lac de l'Astarac is home to rich biodiversity, particularly from an ornithological point of view, as it is a migratory stopover or wintering area for many bird species. These include herons, such as the Grey heron, the Cattle egret, and the Black-crowned Night-Heron. It is also home to egrets, birds of prey (such as: Booted eagle, Red kite), spoonbills, geese, and bats, such as the Bechstein's bat. It is also suspected that Purple heron and Little bittern also nest in the region.

=== Botany ===
Lac de l'Astarac is also home to a wide collection of local flora as well: Coeloglossum viride, Crypsis schoenoides, Fagus sylvatica, Limosella aquatica, Ophrys papilionacea, Ophrys aegirtica.

== Tourist activities ==
Swimming is prohibited all year round. Nevertheless, the lake is a major tourist attraction in the Astarac region, with fishing a common activity, including sport, night, leisure, and boat fishing. Fish available for catching include: carp, roach, pike-perch, perch, trout, and pike.

The site is also popular with sports enthusiasts. There are various paths around the lake for walking and mountain biking. There's also a fitness trail with a loop of 3 kilometres (1.9 mi), with a variety of fitness modules. Sports and leisure events take place throughout the year, such as the Adventure racing. There are also several picnic areas.

== Gallery ==
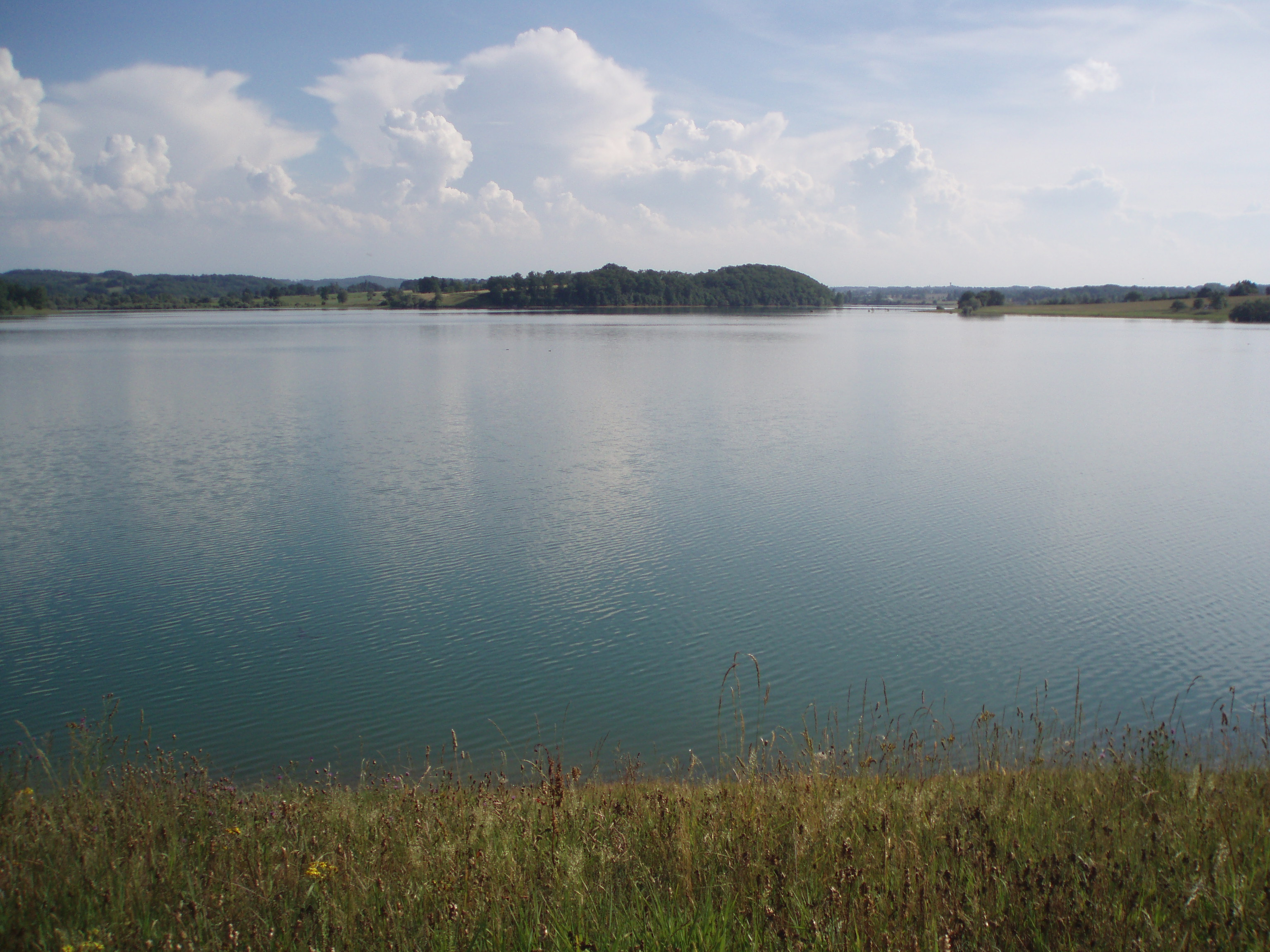
General View, circa 2011

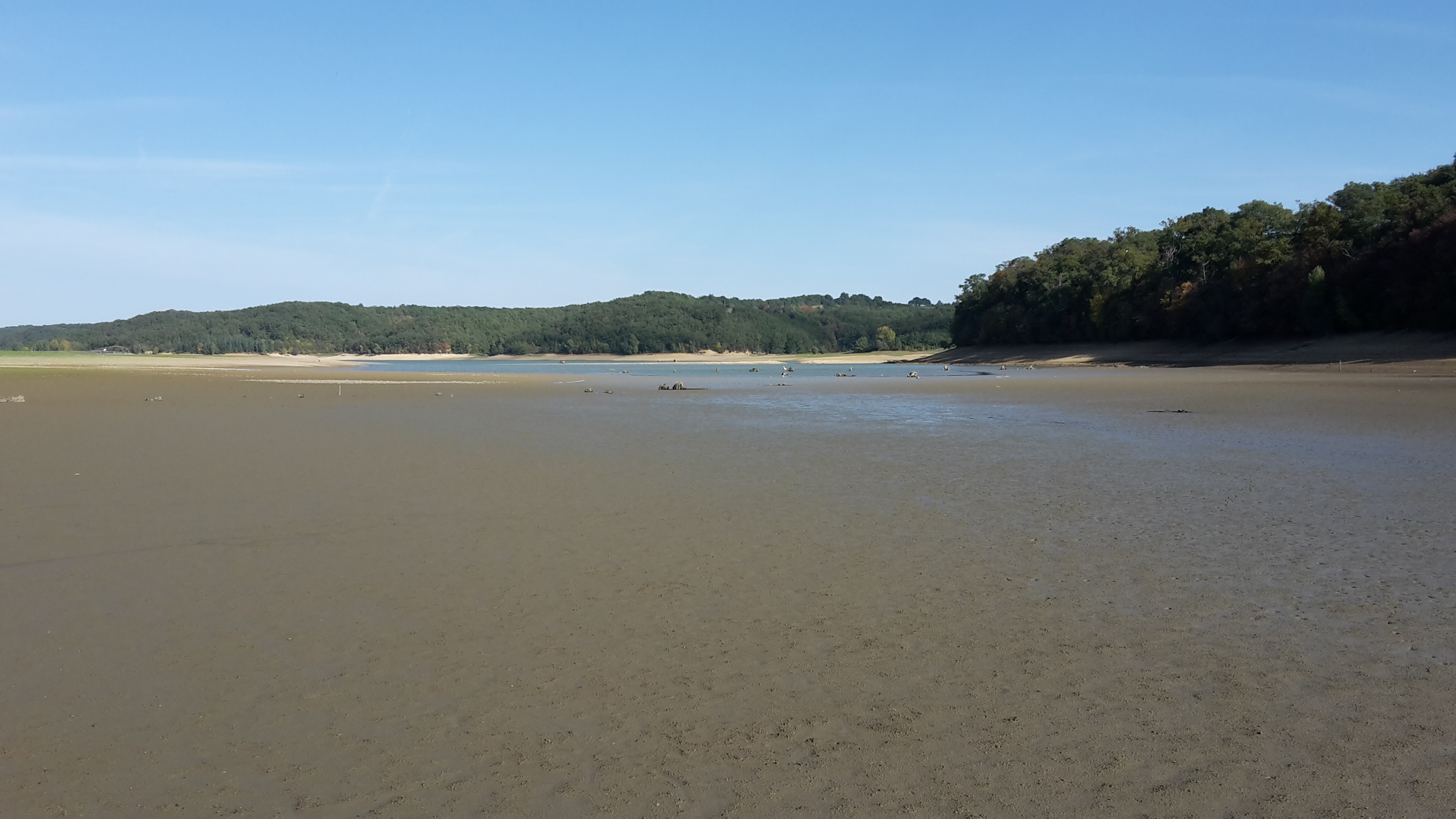
Low water volume in Autumn 2016...

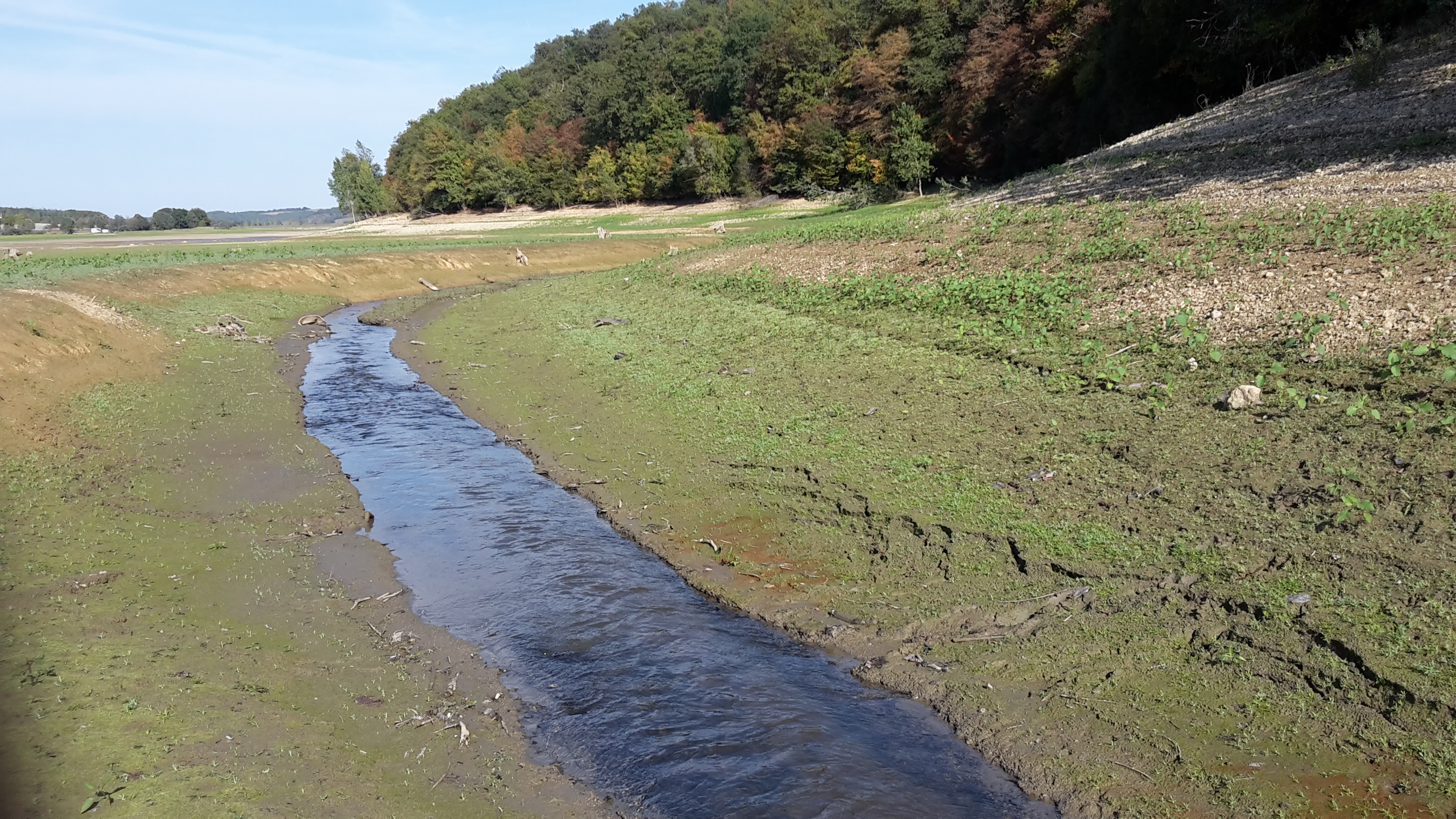
...resetting the course of the Arrats.

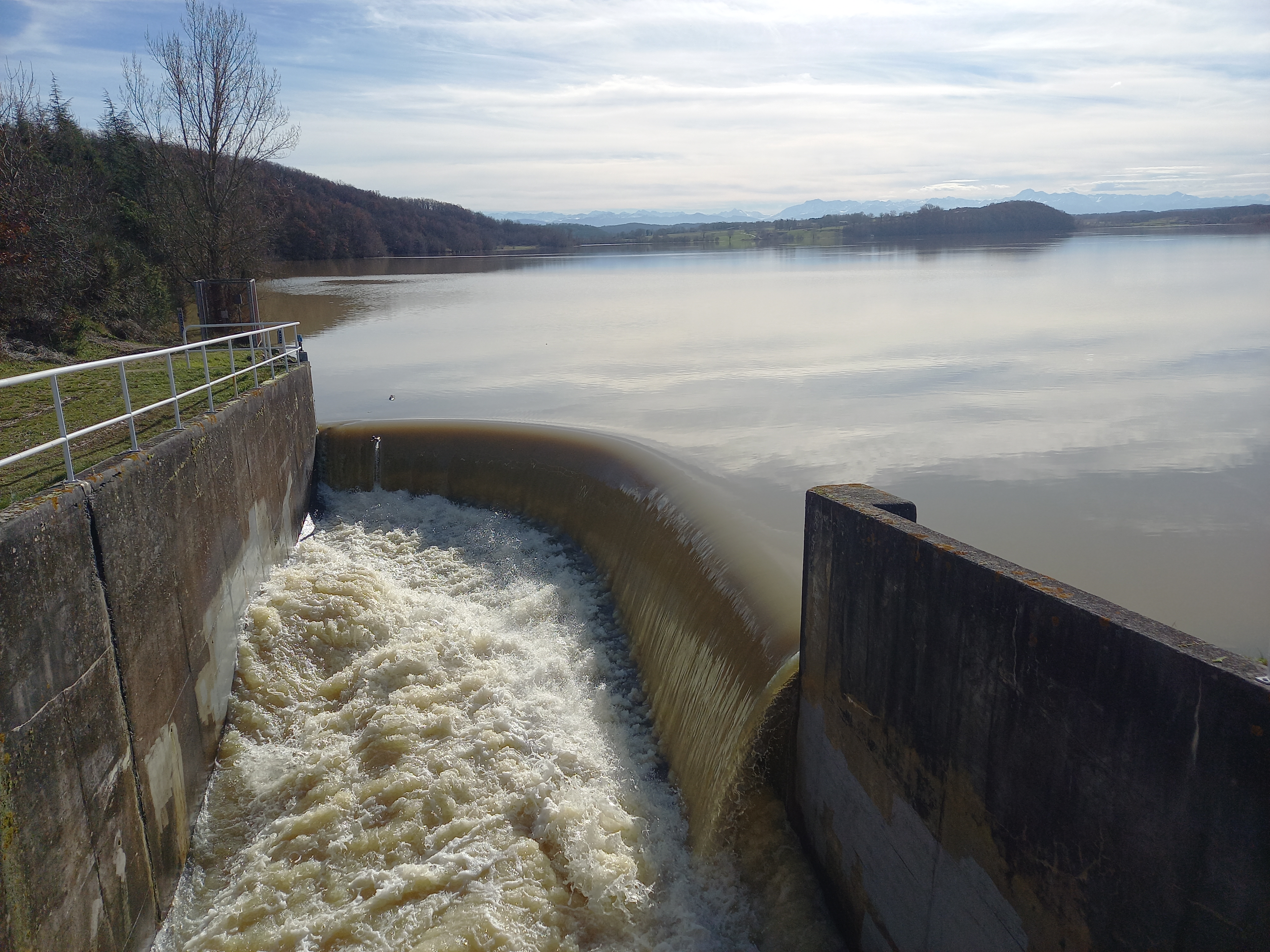
Lake water flowing towards the weir during the February 2021 flood.

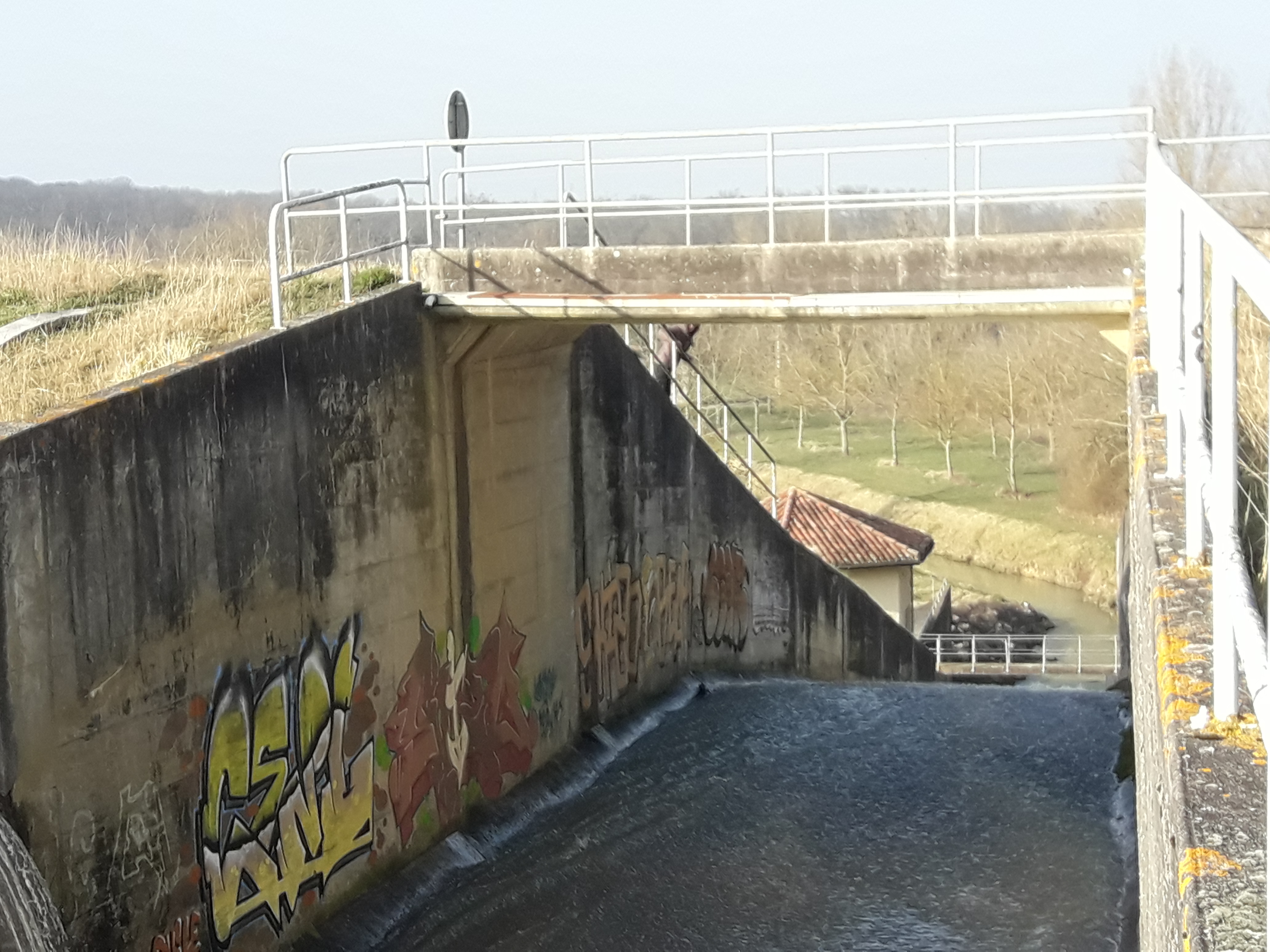
Upper part of the weir.

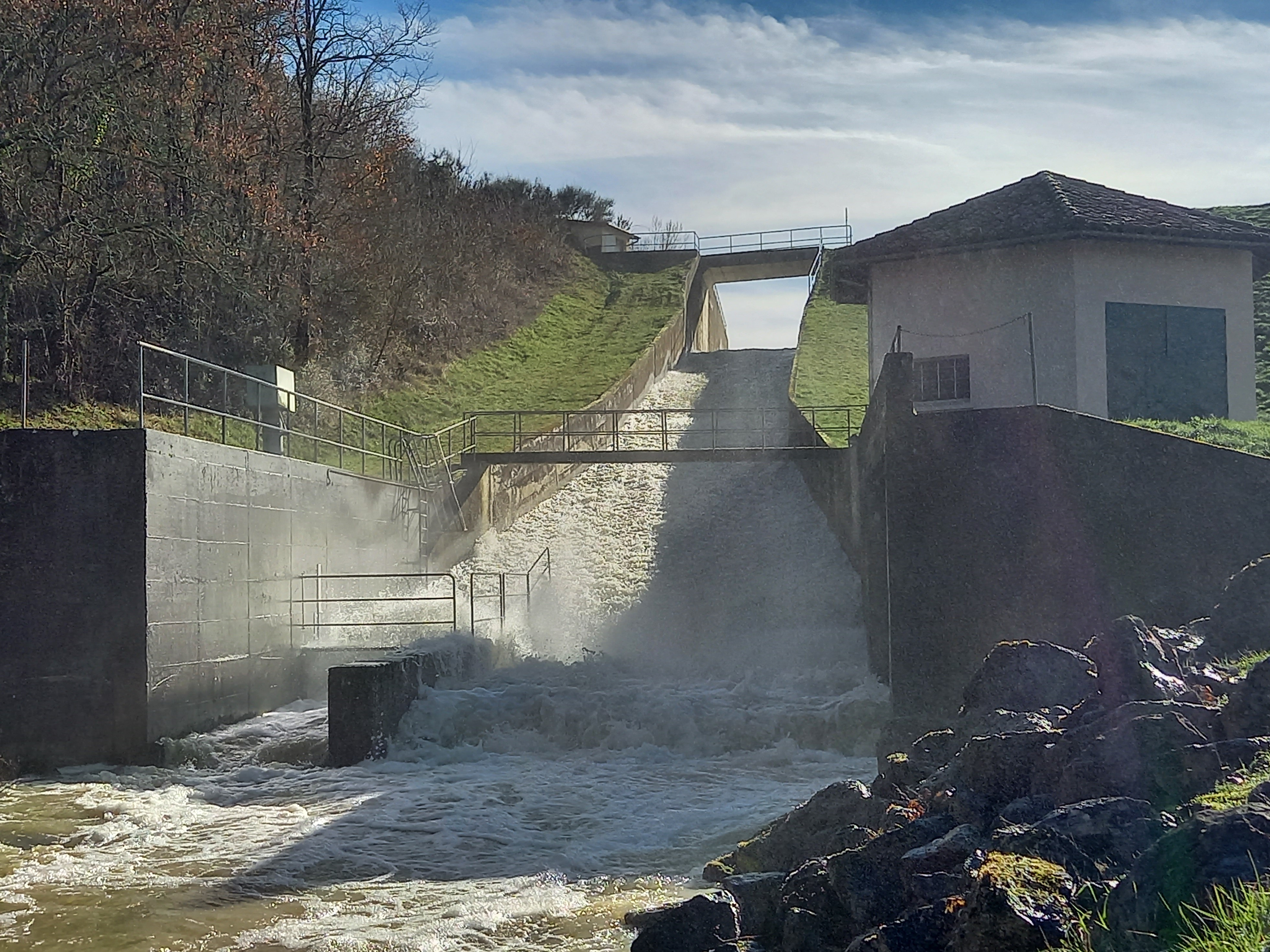
Lower part of the weir.

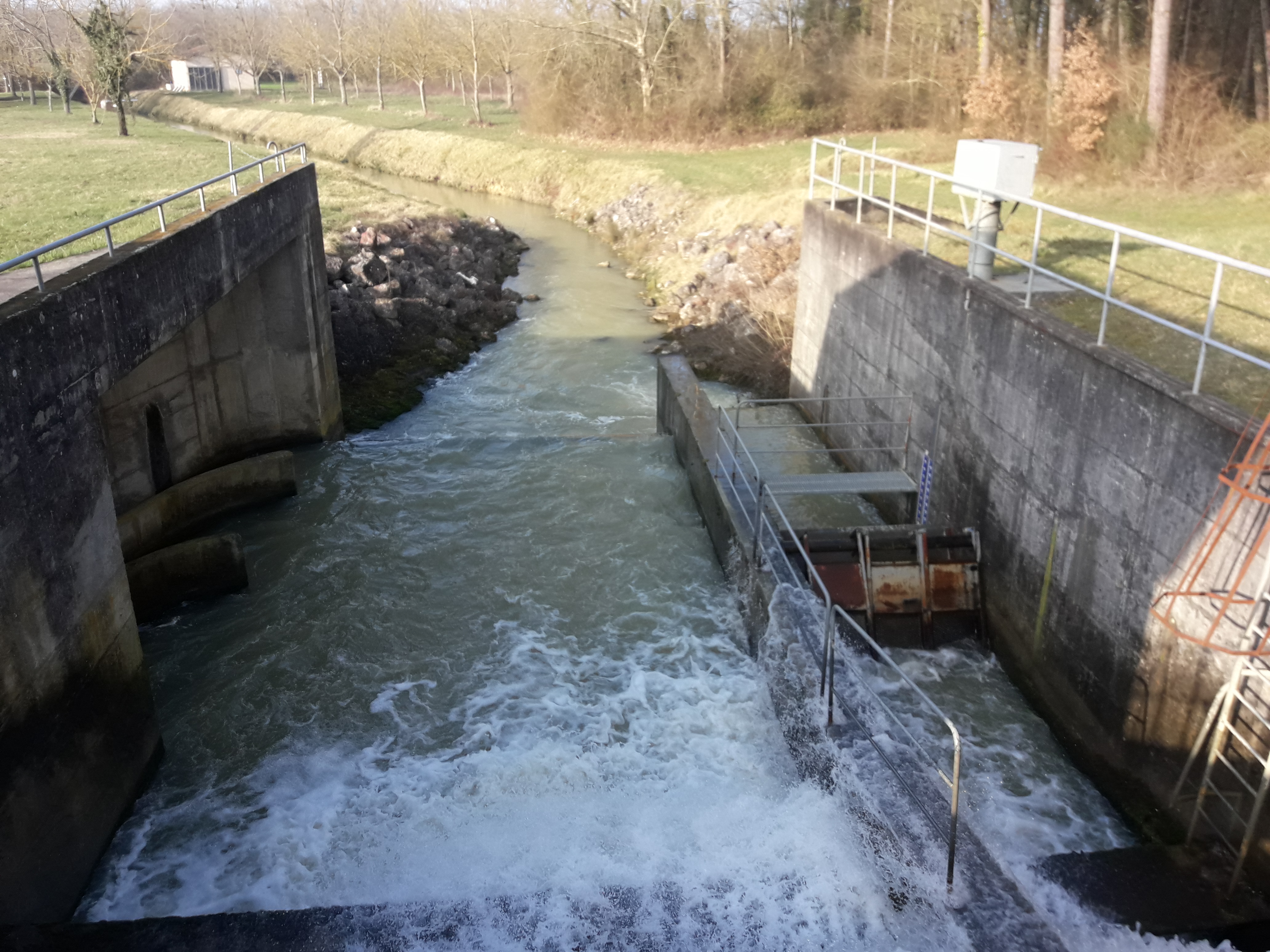
Another view of the lower section

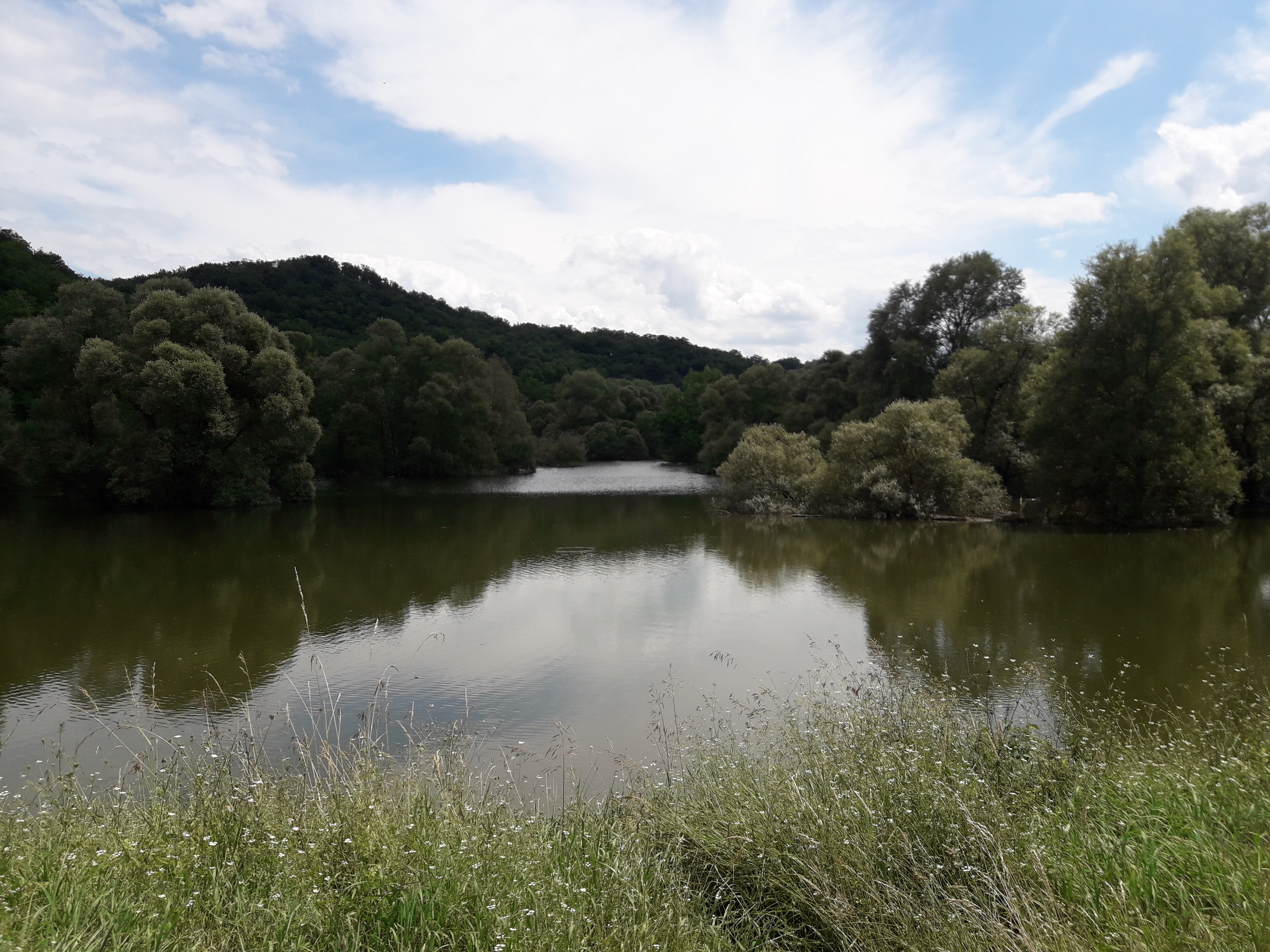
Natural section of the southeast arm of the lake.

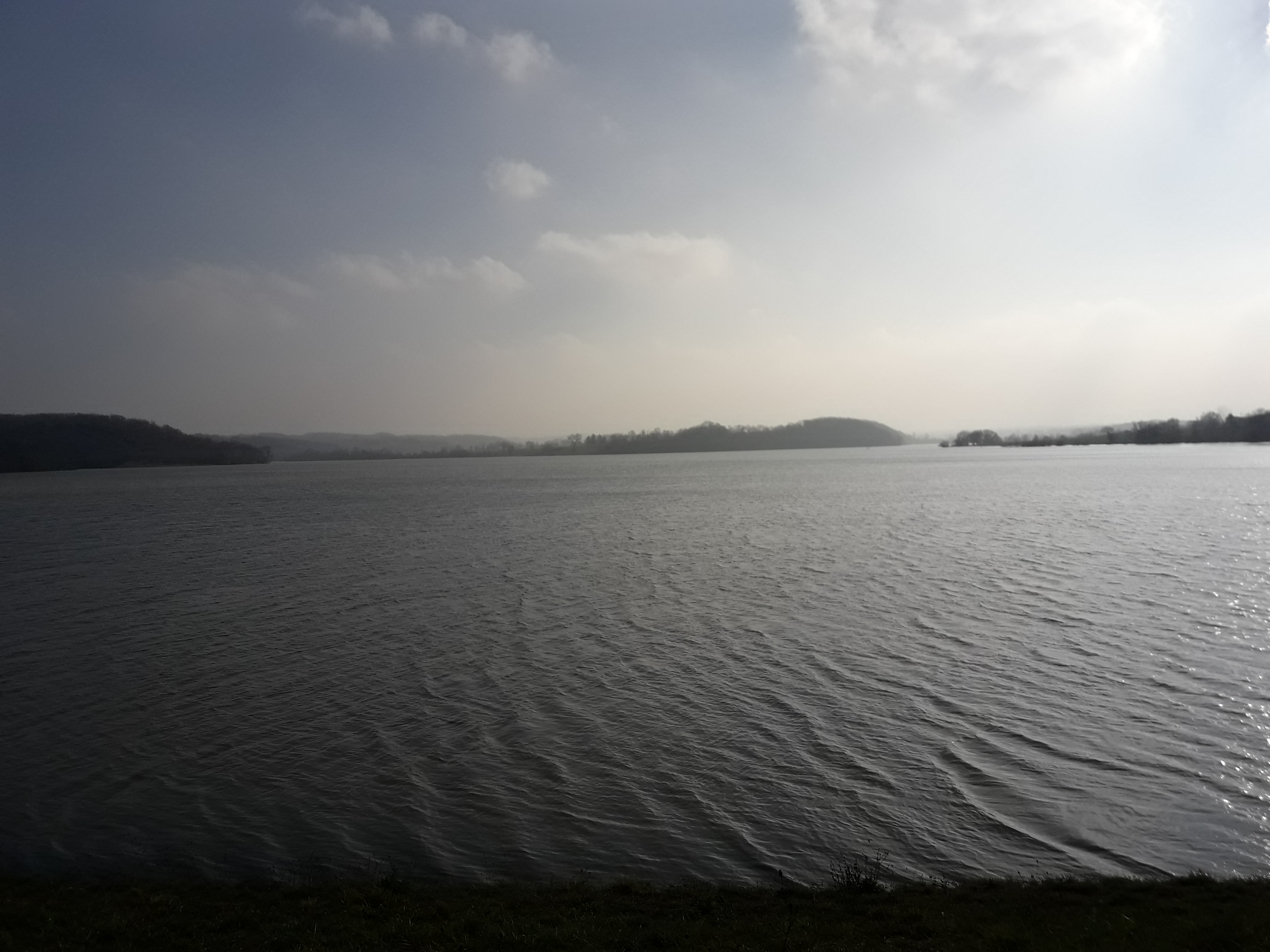
The lake in winter 2018...

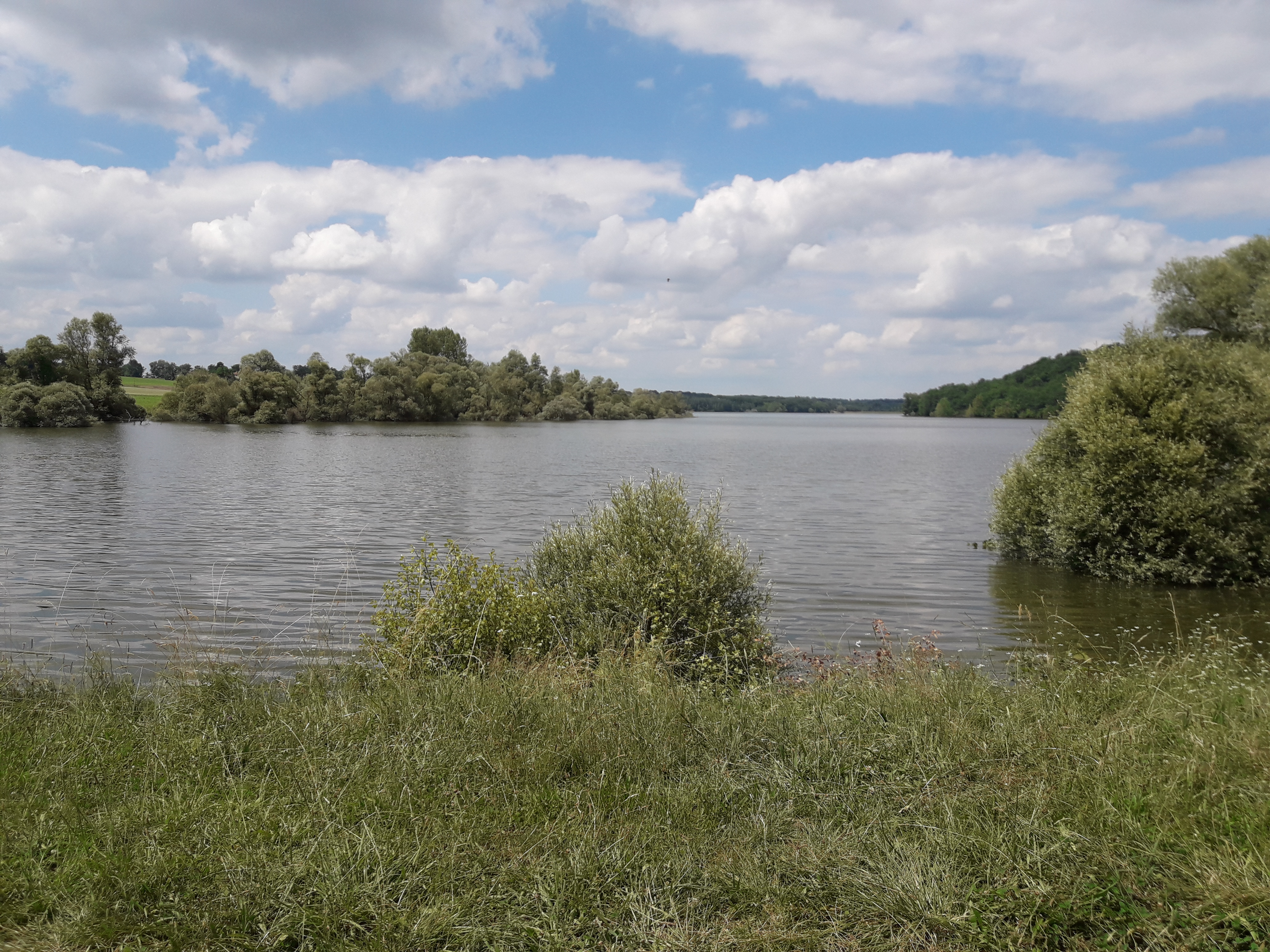
...and then in summer 2018.

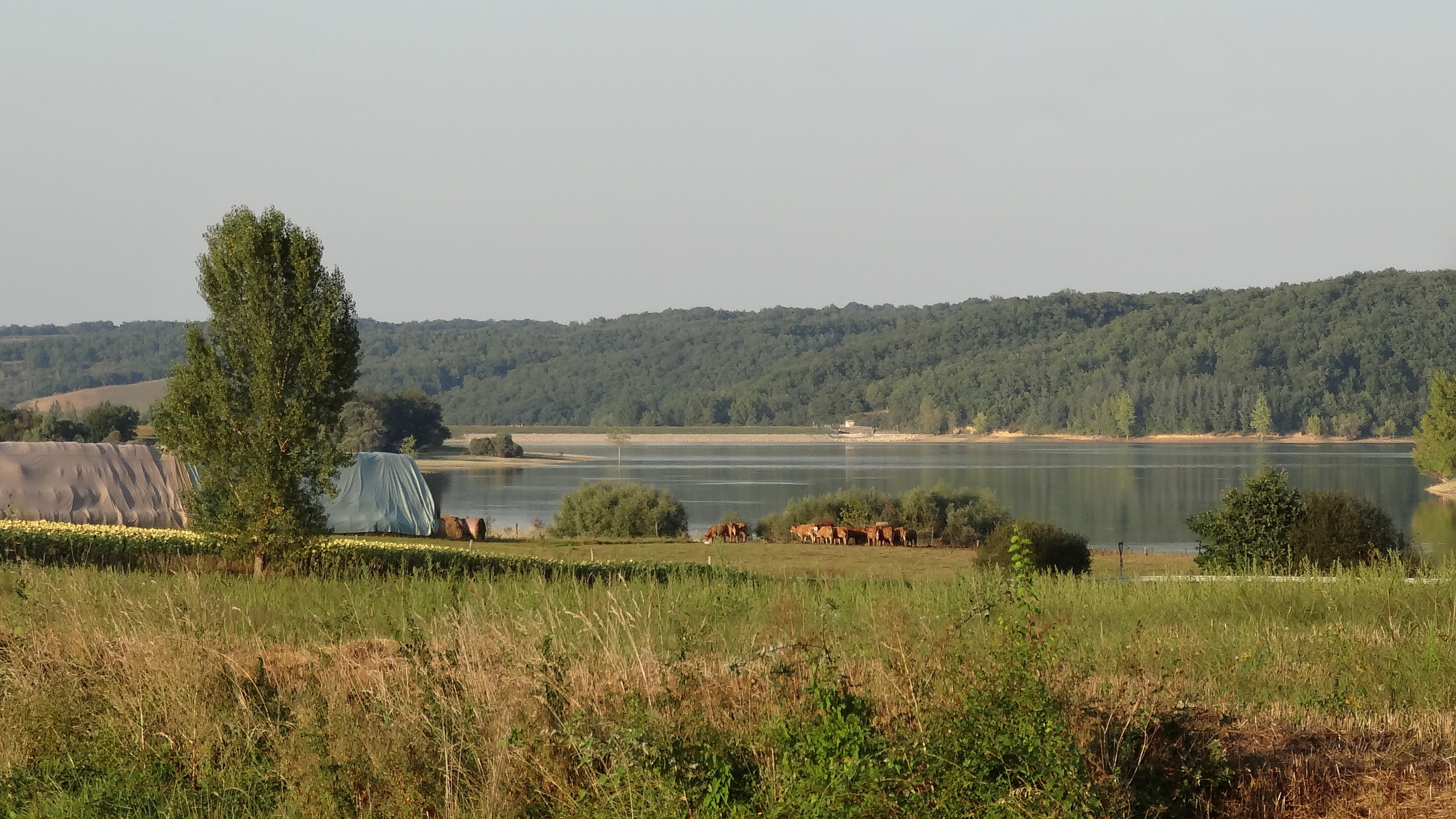
The lake and its surroundings in September 2021.

== Sources ==
- French Wikipedia, Lac de l'Astararc; Accessed 2 December 2024.
