= Arrats de devant =

Arrats de devant Petit Arrats
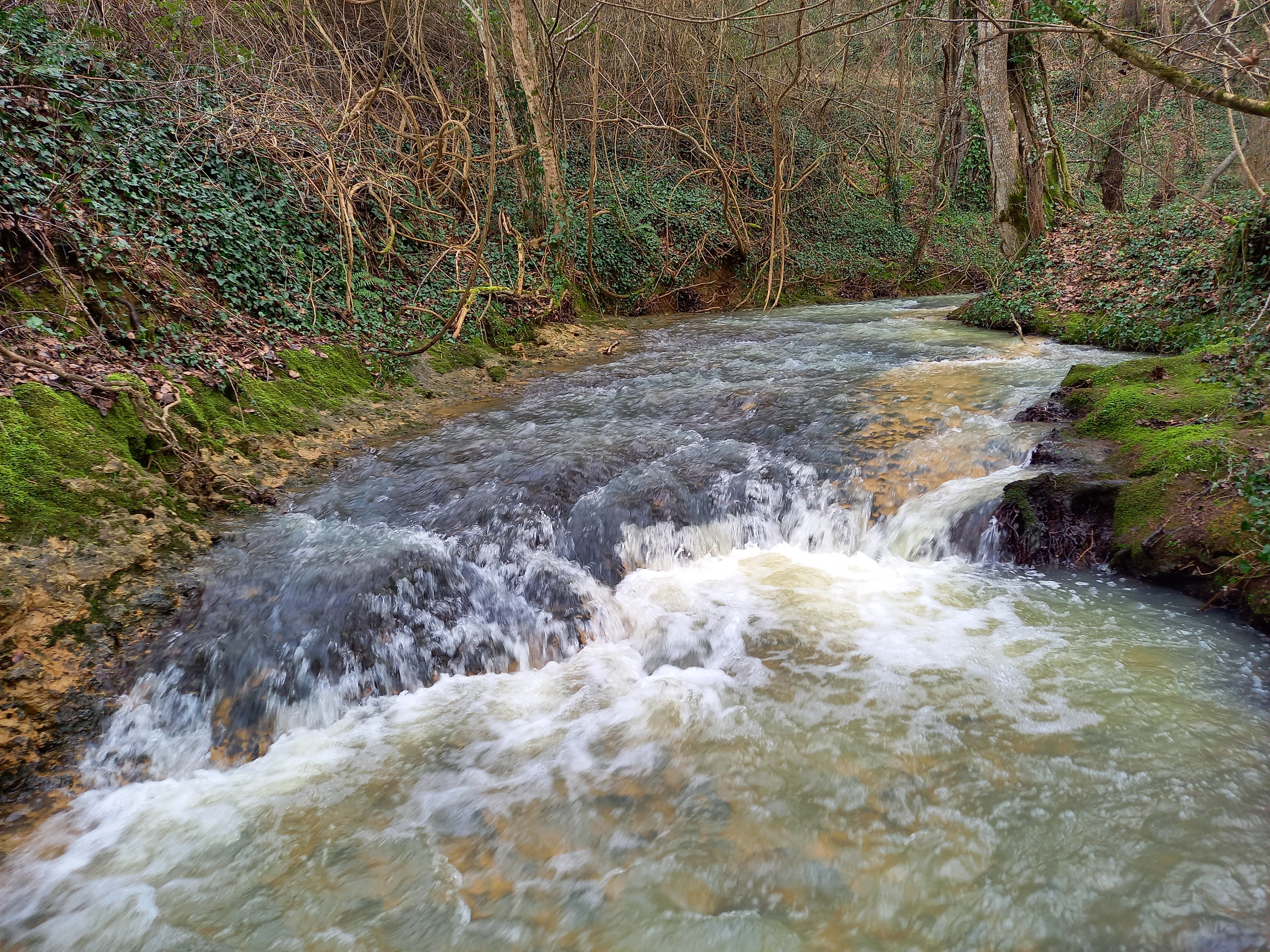
- Waterfall, located on the section of river, running through the commune of Saint-Blancard.

- Location of Arrats de devant (Occitanie region)

Physical characteristics
- Source: Gascony
  - location: Betbeze
  - coordinates: 43°17′18″N 0°34′04″E
  - elevation: 387.05 m (1,269.8 ft)
- Mouth: Arrats (Lac de l'Astarac)
  - location: Bézues-Bajon
  - coordinates: 43°22′54″N 0°37′51″E
  - elevation: 237.51 m (779.2 ft)
- Length: 14 km (8.7 mi)

Basin features
- Progression: Arrats→ Garonne→ Gironde estuary→ Atlantic Ocean
- Tributaries
  - left: Métairie du Bois; Briquet
  - right: Gouttillets; Nax

The Arrats de devant, sometimes called the Petit Arrats (little Arrats), is a river in southern France and a sub-tributary of the Garonne via the Arrats.

== Geography ==
Measuring 14.1 km (8.8 mi) long, the Arrats de devant originates in the Hautes-Pyrénées department in the commune of Betbeze, starting an elevation of 387.05 m (1,269.8 ft). It flows into the Arrats at the commune of Bézues-Bajon in the Lac de l'Astarac, ending at an elevation of 237.51 m (779.2 ft).

Lac de l'Astarac is formed from two forks, creating a Y-shape. The east fork is the Petit Arrats, while the west fork is formed by the upstream part of the Arrats.

=== Departments and towns intersected ===
- Hautes-Pyrénées:
  - Betbeze,
  - Thermes-Magnoac,
  - Casterets.
- Gers:
  - Mont-d'Astarac,
  - Lalanne-Arqué,
  - Manent-Montané,
  - Saint-Blancard,
  - Cabas-Loumassès,
  - Aussos,
  - Bézues-Bajon

== Main tributaries ==
- (L) Métairie du Bois creek : 1.4 km (0.87 mi)
- (L) Briquet creek : 1.4 km (0.87 mi)
- (R) Gouttillets creek : 1.3 km (0.81 mi)
- (R) Nax creek : 1.5 km (0.93 mi)

(R) right bank; (L) left bank.

== Gallery ==
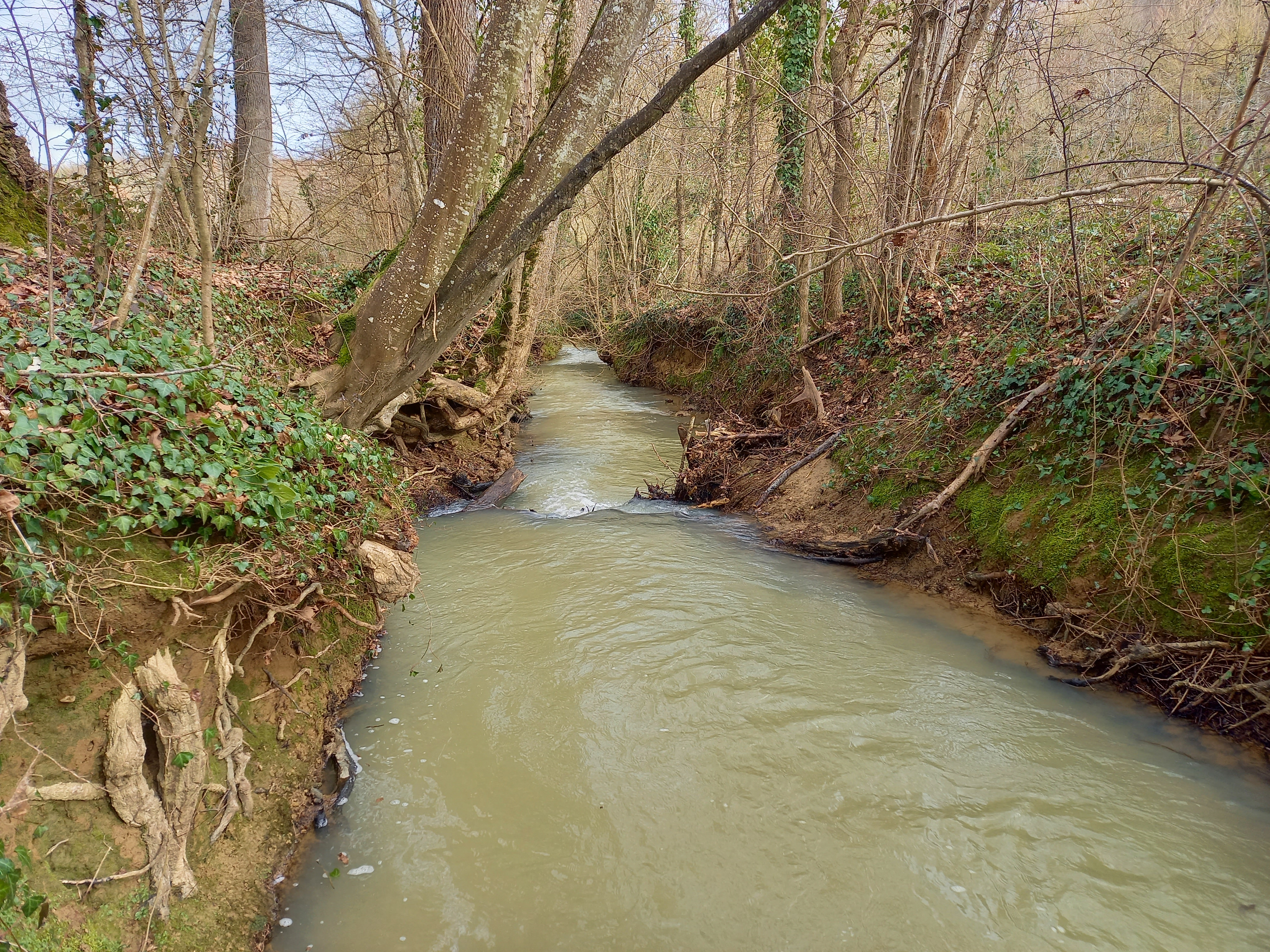
Natural log jam on the river destroyed by the February 2021 flood.

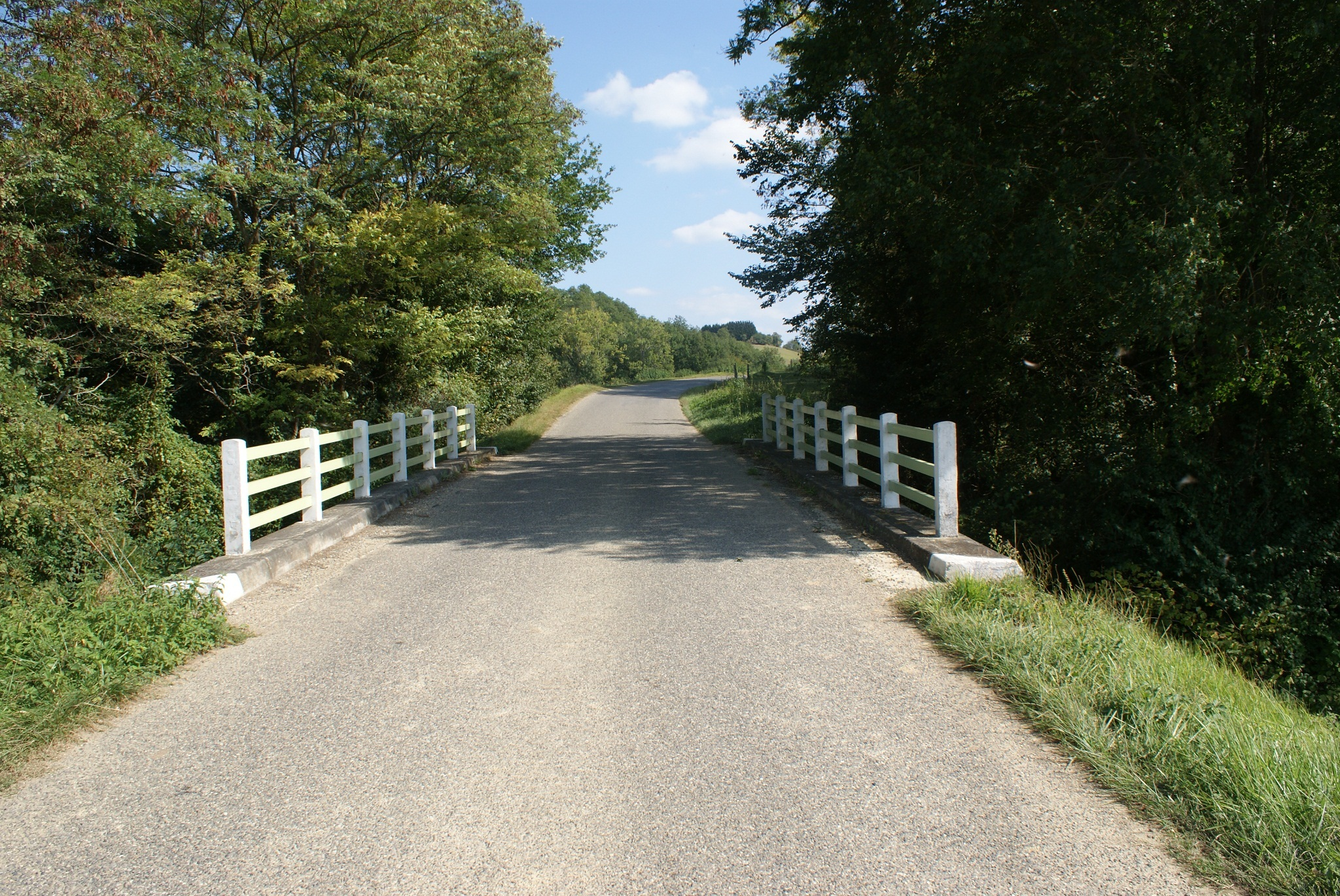
Bridge over the D139.

== Sources ==
- French Wikipedia; Arrats de devant, Accessed on December 4, 2024.
