= Killing of Rémi Fraisse =

2014 killing by the French gendarmerie

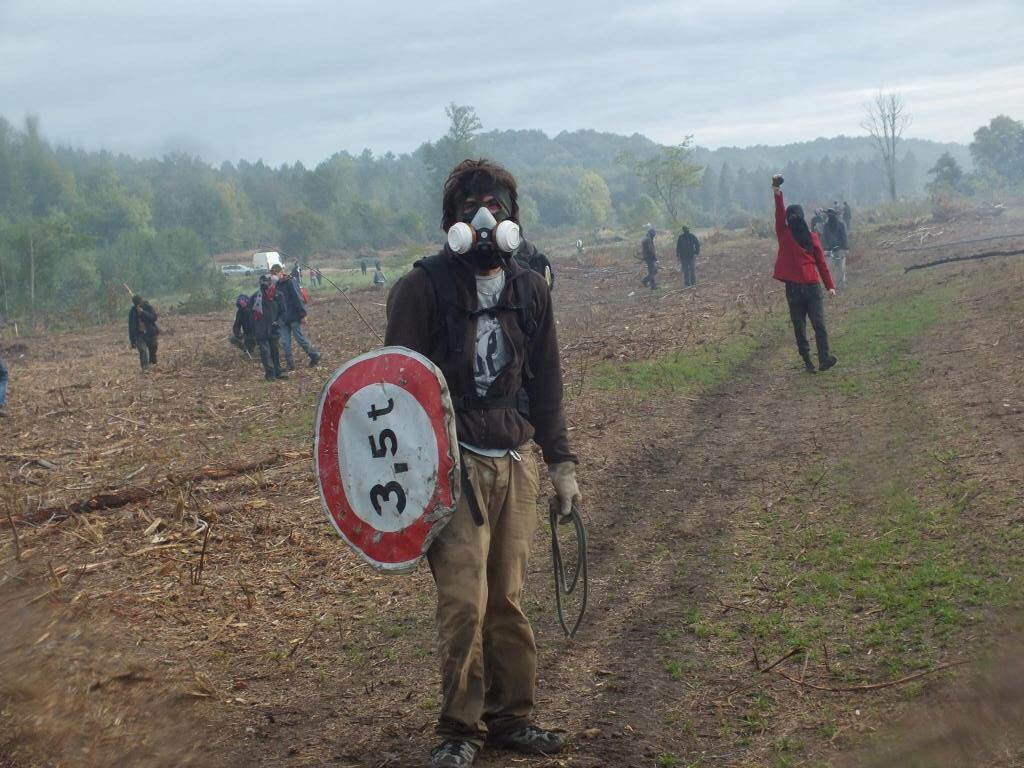
Riots in Sivens Dam, October 2014

Demonstration on the Sivens Dam site on October 25, 2014

Rémi Fraisse (French pronunciation: [ʁemi fʁɛs]; August 31, 1993 in Toulouse – October 26, 2014 in Lisle-sur-Tarn) was a French botanist involved in nature conservation. He was killed by the explosion of an OF-F1 grenade. The projectile was fired by an officer of the gendarmerie; his family later brought charges against him. Fraisse died at the age of 21 during protests against the construction of the Sivens Dam.

== Career ==
Fraisse had a degree in Nature Management and Protection, he volunteered as a botanist, and had a precarious employment situation.

Music was another of Fraisse's interests; he played the guitar and the didgeridoo, and reggae and blues were the music styles he enjoyed.

== Death ==
The proposed Sivens Dam project created an ecologist and anti-developmental movement which occupied the wetlands affected, renamed it to "ZAD du Testet", and opposed the progress of the construction works.

At around 1:40 in the morning of October 26, 2014 there was fighting between the police and the protestors. According to his relatives, Fraisse felt outraged, and ran spontaneously towards a skirmish, when he realized how violent the National Gendarmerie was being against the demonstrators. He was struck by an OF F1 offensive grenade thrown by the police and died due to significant wounds in the back, including fractures and severing of the spinal cord and the tearing of part of the left lung, caused by an explosion of TNT. Some minutes later, his body was collected by the authorities. Twenty-three F1 explosives grenades were thrown within the three-hour period that morning starting 1 a.m., according to gendarmerie boss Denis Favier.

== Aftermath ==
After the death of Fraisse, the government suffered a social and political crisis for over a month, with riots in Toulouse, Albi, Gaillac, Nantes, Paris, Saint-Denis, Rennes, Dijon, as well as other protests against police violence across the country.

The ruling Socialist government was criticised by Green deputies for initially making no comment on the death. Bernard Cazeneuve, Minister of Interior, denounced the Greens for blaming the police. Cazeneuve would himself later call the death a "tragedy", adding he offered his resignation to President François Hollande, who refused it.

The regional council quickly decided to halt construction on the dam. Thierry Carcenac, head of the council, said "What happened was terrible and should never happen again." In January 2015, Minister of Ecology Ségolène Royal announced that the dam was cancelled.

The father of Fraisse stated he would press murder charges against the gendarme who fired the grenade which killed his son.

== Murder charges ==
An internal police investigation in 2014 had cleared the officer, stating he had made the necessary warnings. In 2016, the officer was heard as a witness in the case but not charged. Judges decided in 2018 that the gendarme did not fire the offensive grenade aiming to kill Fraisse on purpose. They did not dispute that the officer shot the grenade, but they did not see an intention to kill. The lawyer of the officer said the violence had been proportionate. The family of Fraisse immediately announced that they would appeal the decision.

The appeal against this judgement was suspended whilst another legal challenge was made. The family questioned the constitutional arrangement in which gendarmerie officers acting under civil command could be judged under military law (instead of criminal law) when maintaining public order. The Constitutional Council decided that this was indeed the case in January 2019.
