= Saint-Clar =

- Commune
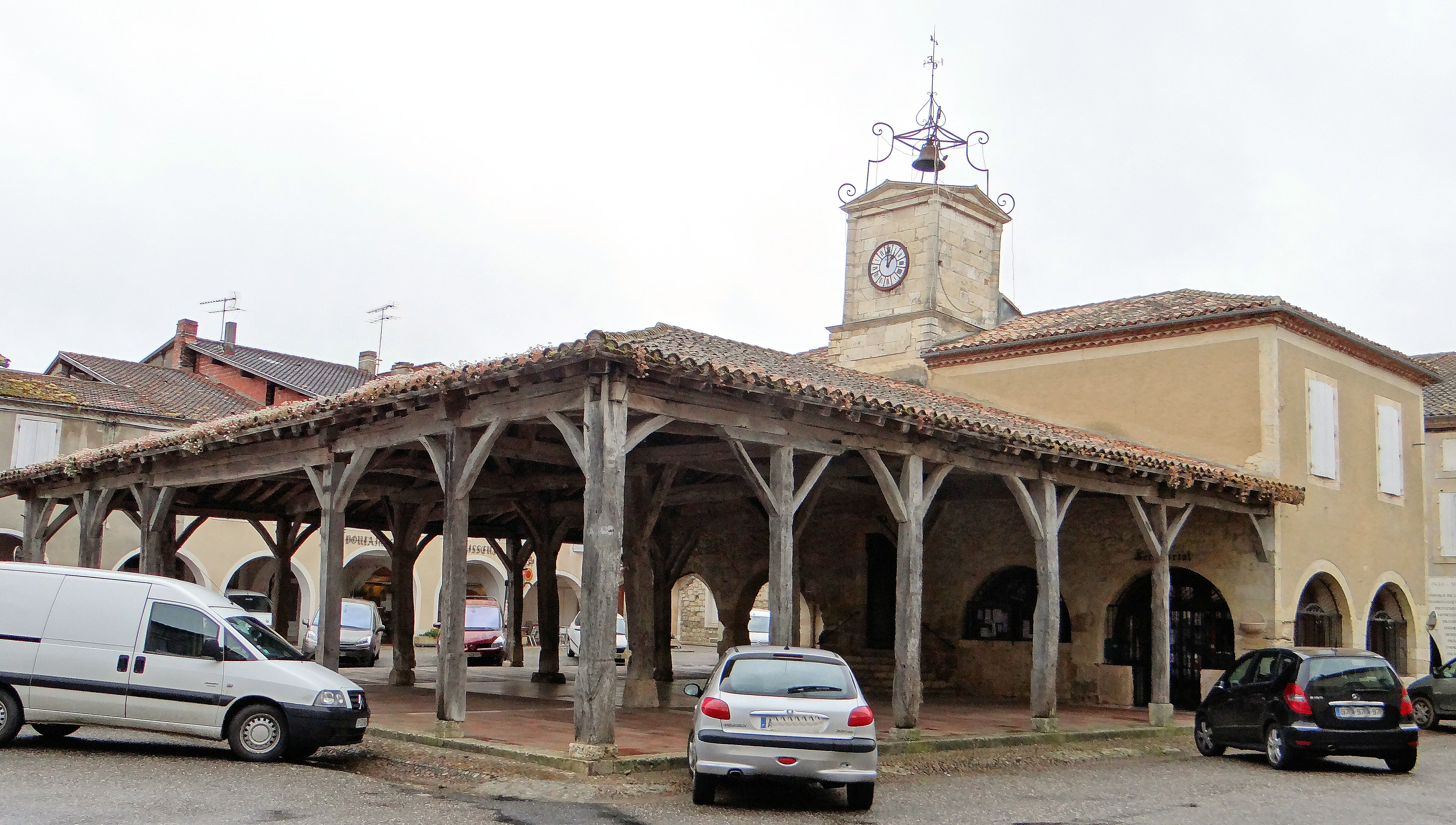
- Covered market and town hall

- Coat of arms
- Location of Saint-Clar
- Location within France Location within Occitanie
- Coordinates: 43°53′34″N 0°46′15″E
- Country: France
- Region: Occitania
- Department: Gers
- Arrondissement: Condom
- Canton: Fleurance-Lomagne

Government
  - Mayor (2022–2026): Eric Ballester
- Area^{1}: 17.91 km^{2} (6.92 sq mi)
- Elevation: 160 m (520 ft)
- Highest elevation: 193 m (633 ft)
- Lowest elevation: 93 m (305 ft)
- Population (2023): 1,062
  - Density: 59.30/km^{2} (153.6/sq mi)
- Time zone: UTC+01:00 (CET)
  - Summer (DST): UTC+02:00 (CEST)
- INSEE/Postal code: 32370 /32380
- ^{1} French Land Register data, which excludes lakes, ponds, glaciers > 1 km^{2} (0.386 sq mi or 247 acres) and river estuaries.

Saint-Clar (French pronunciation: [sɛ̃ klaʁ]; Occitan: Sent Clar) is a commune in the Gers department in southwestern France.

== Geography ==
The river Arrats forms most of the commune's eastern border; the Auroue flows north through the western part of the commune.

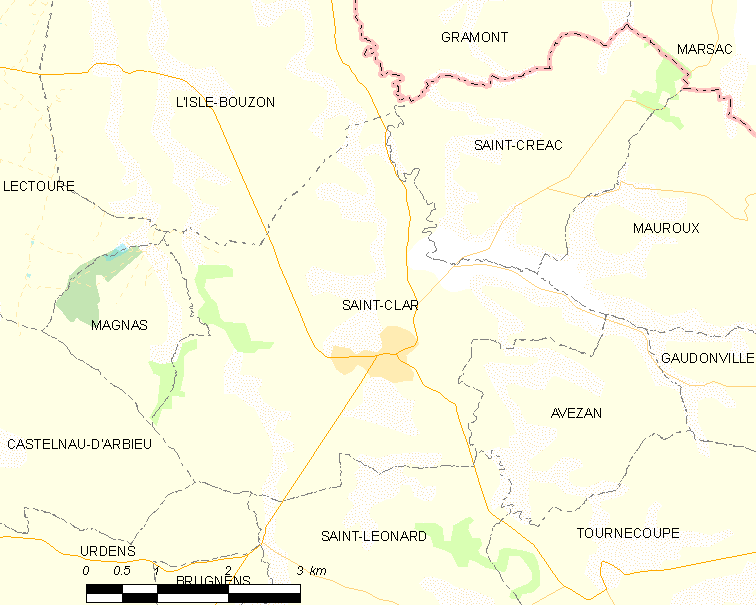
Saint-Clar and its surrounding communes

== History ==
Saint-Clar was founded in 1289 by Edward I, King of England and Duke of Aquitaine.

== Structure ==
Its grid layout follows the standards of the typical Bastides grid. The basic architectural element is the central square boarded by arcades and stone and half-timbered houses. This square was the market place and the center of the communities’ economy. The market hall (market building) in the central square was built with stone and with wooden pillars. Now it hosts the Town Hall (Place de la Mairie), which has a beautiful steeple with clock. This Town Hall was better known as “maison commune”. Apart from that central square, Saint-Clar has one more arcaded square, both just a few steps away from each other. This is located in the south, in the original village, in the “castet bielh” (old quarter).

== Population ==
Historical population
Year	Pop.	±% p.a.
1968	1,033	—
1975	987	−0.65%
1982	972	−0.22%
1990	879	−1.25%
1999	868	−0.14%
2007	983	+1.57%
2012	999	+0.32%
2017	1,015	+0.32%
2023	1,062	+0.76%
Source: INSEE

== See also ==
- Communes of the Gers department
