= Monties =

- Commune
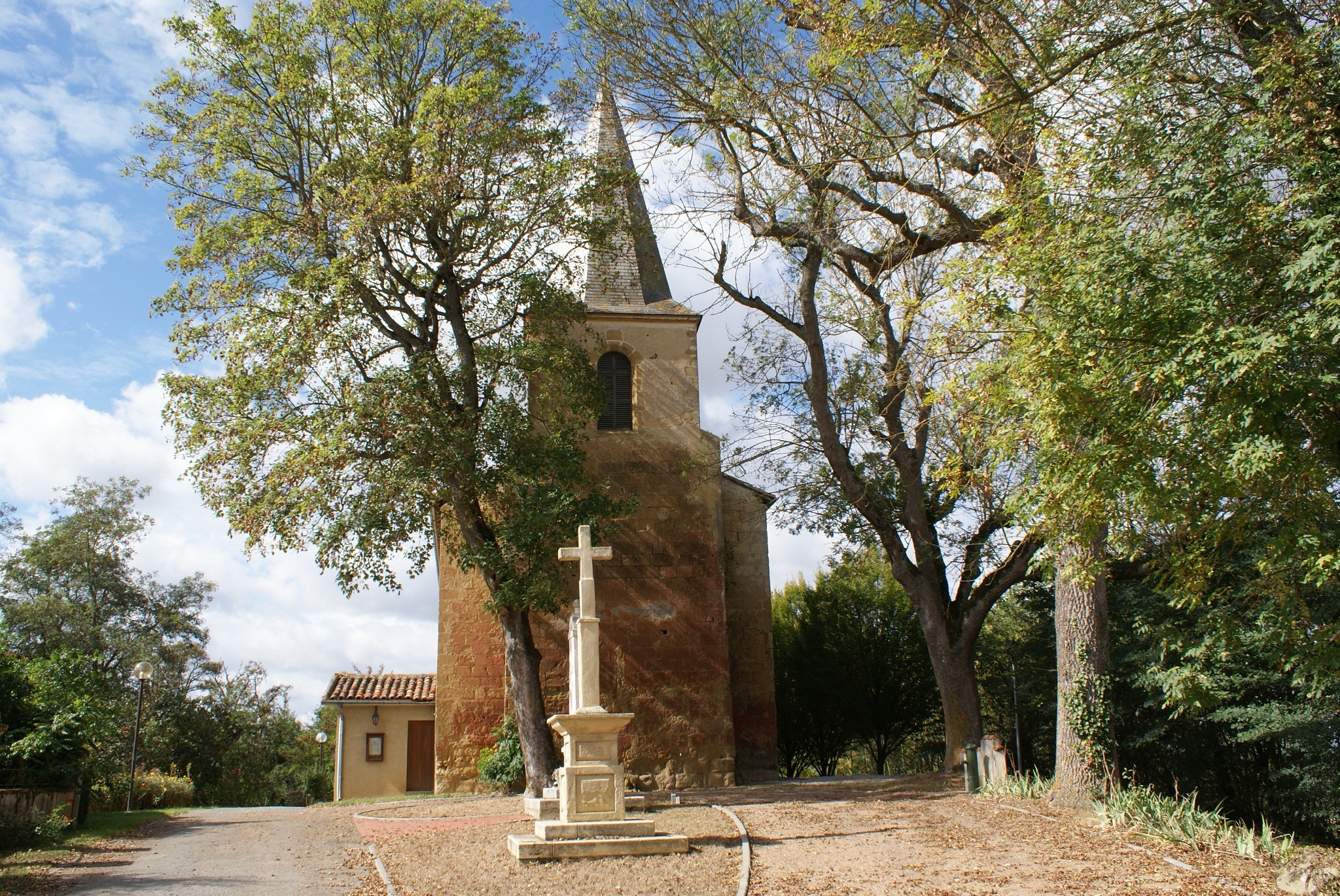
- The church in Monties
- Location of Monties
- Location within France Location within Occitanie
- Coordinates: 43°23′27″N 0°40′38″E
- Country: France
- Region: Occitania
- Department: Gers
- Arrondissement: Mirande
- Canton: Astarac-Gimone

Government
  - Mayor (2020–2026): Michel Court
- Area^{1}: 10.55 km^{2} (4.07 sq mi)
- Elevation: 545 m (1,788 ft)
- Highest elevation: 335 m (1,099 ft)
- Lowest elevation: 218 m (715 ft)
- Population (2023): 83
  - Density: 7.9/km^{2} (20/sq mi)
- Time zone: UTC+01:00 (CET)
  - Summer (DST): UTC+02:00 (CEST)
- INSEE/Postal code: 32287 /32420
- ^{1} French Land Register data, which excludes lakes, ponds, glaciers > 1 km^{2} (0.386 sq mi or 247 acres) and river estuaries.

Monties (French pronunciation: [mɔ̃ti]; Occitan: Montias) is a commune in the Gers department in southwestern France. Between 1822 and 1949, it was united with Aussos in the commune Monties-Aussos.

== Geography ==
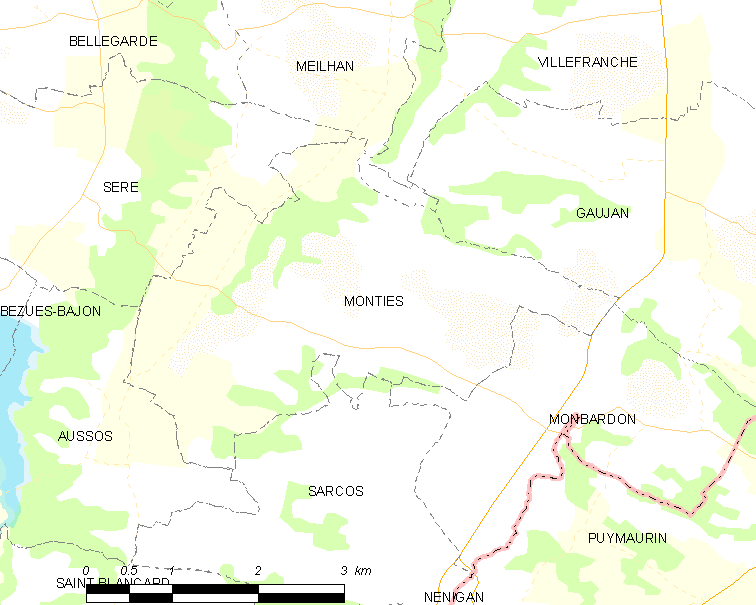
Monties and its surrounding communes

== Population ==
Historical population
Year	Pop.	±% p.a.
1968	115	—
1975	102	−1.70%
1982	103	+0.14%
1990	102	−0.12%
1999	108	+0.64%
2007	76	−4.30%
2012	76	+0.00%
2017	77	+0.26%
2023	83	+1.26%
Source: INSEE

== See also ==
- Communes of the Gers department
