= Tescou =

River in southern France

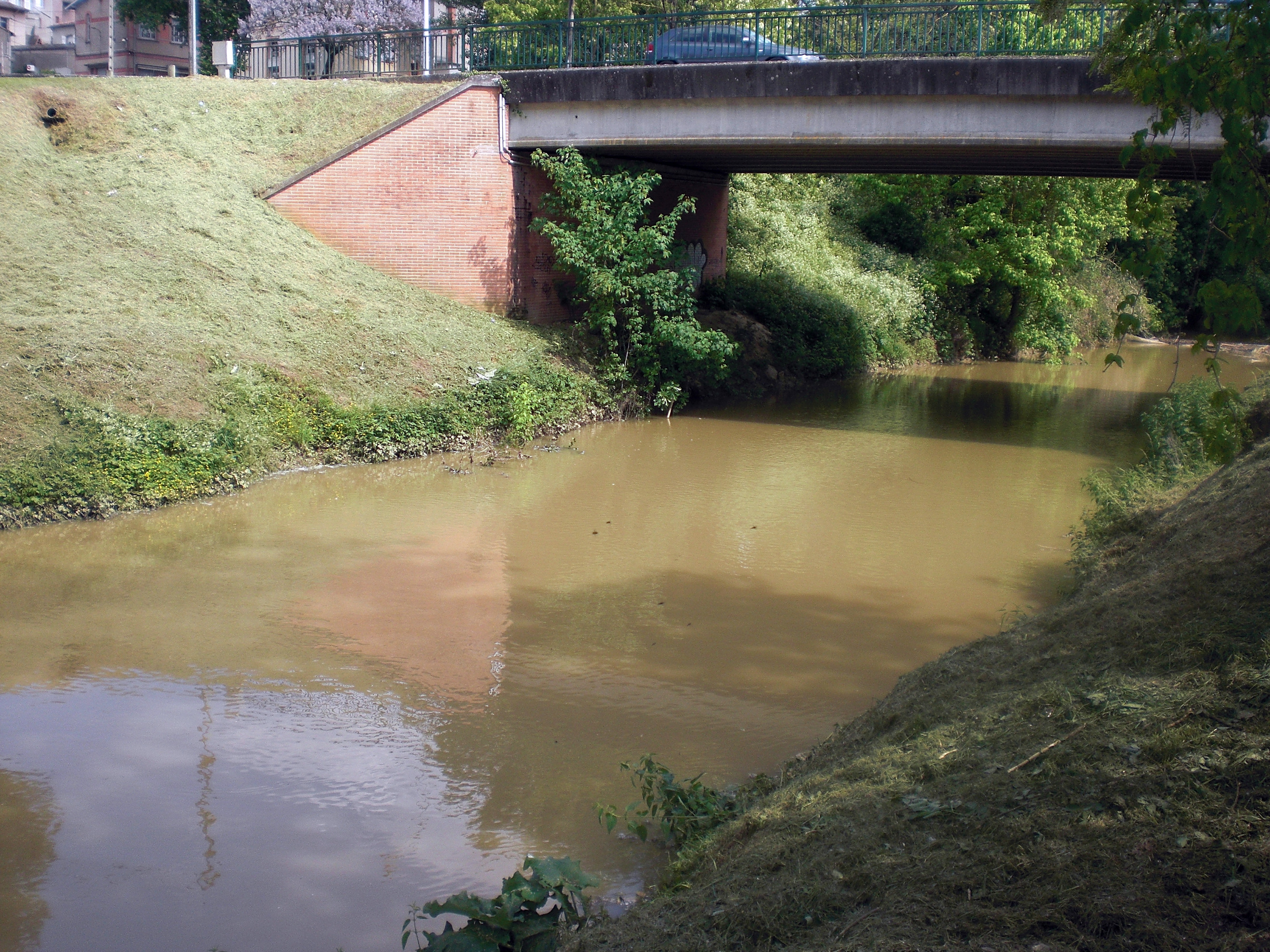
- The Tescou at Montauban

- Location within France Location within Occitanie
- Native name: Le Tescou (French)

Location
- Country: France

Physical characteristics
- Source
  - location: Gaillac, France
  - coordinates: 43°57′11″N 1°51′54″E
- Mouth: Tarn
  - location: Montauban, France
  - coordinates: 44°0′58″N 1°20′57″E
- Length: 48.8 km (30.3 mi)
- Basin size: 320 km^{2} (120 mi^{2})
- Discharge
  - average: 1.08 m^{3}/s (38 cu ft/s)

Basin features
- Progression: Tarn→ Garonne→ Gironde estuary→ Atlantic Ocean

The Tescou (French: Le Tescou) is a tributary of the Tarn in the basin of the Garonne in southern France. It flows 48.8 kilometres (30.3 mi) through the departments of Tarn, Tarn-et-Garonne and Haute-Garonne.

The source is near Gaillac in the Massif Central, and its confluence with the Tarn is near Montauban in the Tarn-et-Garonne department in the Occitanie administrative region.

In 2014 construction work began on the Sivens Dam (Barrage de Sivens), to supply irrigation for local farms.

On 25 October 2014, Rémi Fraisse, a 21-year-old student protesting against the Sivens Dam across the Tescou, was killed after being hit in the back by a grenade, sparking further violent protests.
