= Sivens Dam =

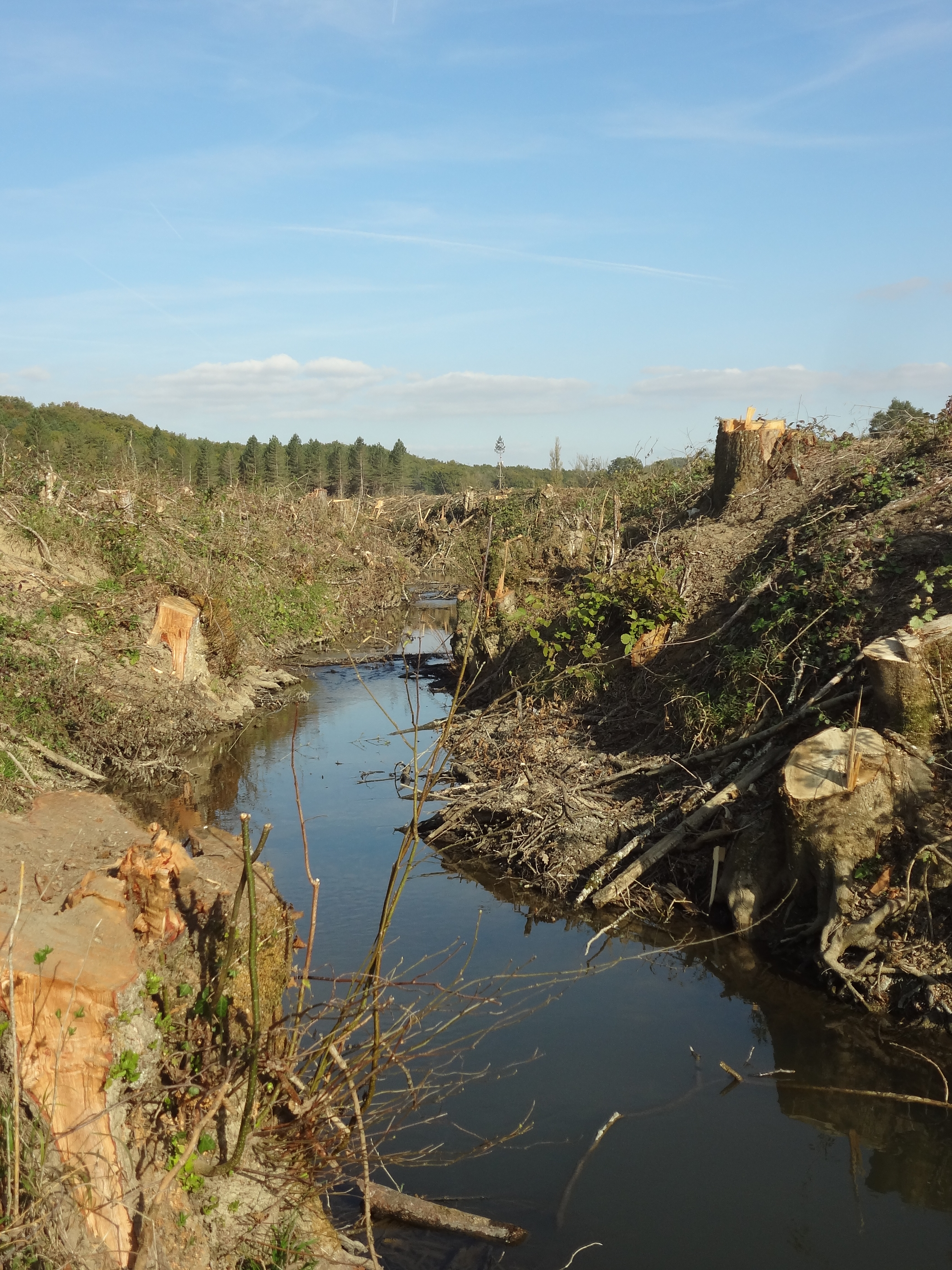

- Location within France
- Official name: Barrage de Sivens
- Country: France
- Location: Lisle-sur-Tarn
- Coordinates: 43°55′0″N 1°46′10″E
- Status: Cancelled
- Construction began: August 2014
- Construction cost: 8.4 million euros
- Owner: Department of Tarn

Dam and spillways
- Type of dam: Embankment dam
- Impounds: Tescou
- Height: 12 m (39 ft)
- Height (thalweg): 12.8 m (42 ft)
- Length: 304 m (997 ft)

Reservoir
- Total capacity: 1,500,000 m^{3} (1,200 acre⋅ft)
- Surface area: 42 ha (100 acres)
- Maximum length: 2 km (1.2 mi)

Sivens Dam (Barrage de Sivens) is an abandoned dam project, which was planned to cross the Tescou, a tributary of the Tarn in the basin of the Garonne, in Southern France, near Toulouse. The initial project was abandoned on December 4, 2015, by prefectoral degree. The construction site was 10 km (6.2 mi) north of Lisle-sur-Tarn, in the Department of Tarn (Midi-Pyrénées). The dam was named after the nearby Forest of Sivens.

The project would have created a reservoir, with a volume of 1,500,000 m^{3} (53,000,000 cu ft), that could have been utilized to irrigate local farmland and control low water levels in the river Tescou. The ecological footprint of the project would have resulted in the destruction of 12.7 ha of wetland (18.1 ha in total, taking into account indirect destruction of wetlands by overall loss of functionality). As a result, the project planned a compensatory restoration of land that totaled 19.5 ha in area.

Construction work began in 2014, under the CACG, and was then halted after Rémi Fraisse, a 21-year-old man protesting against the construction project, was killed by an OF-F1 Grenade fired by police. His death was a part of the demonstrations against the dam on October 26, 2014, which sparked further protests across France, some of which were violent. The project was then closed in 2015 by the Minister of Ecology Ségolène Royal.

The Minister of Ecology requested a project assessment report in January 2016. In July 2016, the Toulouse administrative court annulled the three original purposes of the dam project, in particular the declaration of public utility.

== Original plan ==
Sivens is in the Tescou, a tributary of the Tarn in the basin of the Garonne. A barrage project was initiated for the formation of a water reservoir with a volume of 1.5 million cubic metres used especially for irrigation of agricultural land and the control of the low water Tescou. The impact of the project lies in retaining the flooding of 12 hectares of wetland. Countervailing measures were planned to restore a total area of 19.5 hectares of wetlands. This project was to have benefited from 30% European funds (Fedear). The main actors of the project were the general council of Tarn region, Water Agency Adour Garonne, and the development company CACG.

== Protests ==
In 2011, a collective called Tant qu’il y aura des bouilles was created to fight this project. The name means 'As long as there are bouilles,' with bouilles in local dialect meaning a swampy piece of land that is not worth very much money. Hundreds of people came to protect the biodiversity of the wetlands and to prevent the construction of the dam. They created a ZAD (French: zone à défendre) or 'Zone to Defend' in 2013, as a permanent protest camp called ZAD du Testet. It was evicted twice (in February and May 2014) and both times resquatted again. The summer and autumn of 2014 saw many battles between police and demonstrators, as the construction works began.

A policeman was charged in 2018 with a crime punishable by up to 5 years in prison and a fine of 75,000 euros ('violences volontaires') for throwing a grenade into a caravan where three people were sheltering. At first the policeman claimed he threw the grenade at more demonstrators coming as reinforcements but this was not true. He then claimed he had not intended to throw the grenade into the caravan but this was also disproved by the evidence. This event occurred on 7 October 2014, three weeks before the death of Rémi Fraisse. The policeman was convicted in January 2019. He was given a suspended sentence of 6 months, during which time he was forbidden to use a weapon, and he was fined 1,000 euros to be paid to the woman he injured.

Tarn and Tescou drainage basins.

Tarn's drainage basin (in grey), with Tescou's in yellow.

Tescou drainage basin, with location of the Thérondel reservoir and the Sivens dam project.

== Death of Rémi Fraisse ==
Rémi Fraisse, a 21-year-old botanist, was killed instantly by an OF-F1 fragmentation grenade fired in the early hours of Sunday morning, 26 October 2014. It was the first death at a protest on mainland France since 1986. Shortly afterward, the regional council decided to halt work on the project.

In January 2015, Ségolène Royal announced that the project was cancelled.

== Smaller dam ==
In March 2015, the departmental council of Tarn voted narrowly in favour of building a dam and creating a reservoir further upstream, around half the size of the original project. They also requested that the police clear the ZAD.

== See also ==
- Demonstration of October 25 and 26, 2014 against the Sivens dam. fr: Manifestation des 25 et 26 octobre 2014 contre le barrage de Sivens
