= Compagnie d'aménagement des coteaux de Gascogne =

Rives & Eaux du Sud-Ouest
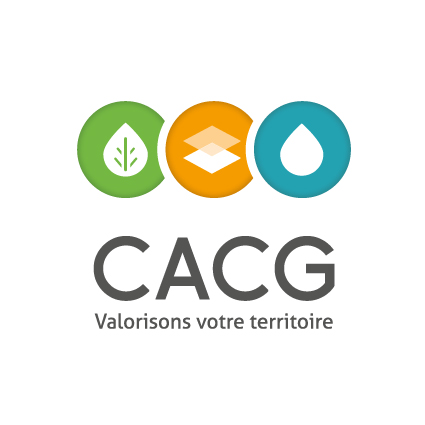
- Formerly: Compagnie d'aménagement des coteaux de Gascogne
- Company type: Mixed Economy
- Industry: Energy; Water; Agriculture
- Founded: 1959; 67 years ago
- Headquarters: Tarbes, France
- Key people: President: Pierre Chéret (Regional Councillor for Nouvelle-Aquitaine); Director: Willy Luis; Deputy Director: Nicolas Daurensan
- Number of employees: 220 (2024)
- Subsidiaries: CA 17 International
- Website: www.riveseteaux.fr

Rives & Eaux du Sud-Ouest formerly Compagnie d'aménagement des coteaux de Gascogne (CACG) (lit. 'Shores & Waters of the Southwest') is a French semi-public development company based in Tarbes (Hautes-Pyrénées). It has around 220 employees. In 2024, it changed its name to “Rives & Eaux du Sud-Ouest” (Rives & Eaux).

It designs, builds, and implements water projects with the aim of contributing to regional development. The main customers of the company are local authorities, farmers and private companies. The company is based in Occitanie, Nouvelle-Aquitaine, and Pays de la Loire.

While its management was criticized by the regional audit office in 2019, a public recapitalization enabled it to avoid bankruptcy in 2023.

== History ==
CACG was created in 1959. Its aim was to develop "modern" agriculture in Gascony, in particular hybrid maize, which had just been invented by the Institut National de Recherche pour l'Agriculture.

The Neste canal was used for the intended agriculture purposes. Irrigation hydrants were distributed free of charge to farmers. With the support of the PAC, water from the Pyrenees reached the cornfields of Gascony.

== Activity ==
Its head office is in Tarbes. It has seven branches: Toulouse, Bruch, Verdun-sur-Garonne, Castelnau-Magnoac, Tarbes, Cazères and Benet.

In 2023, CACG will be in charge of 80 dams and 3,500 km (2,200 mi) of rivers. It supplies water to 280,000 inhabitants, the Arkema plant in Lannemezan, and 200,000 hectares of irrigated crops.

=== Agriculture and Food ===
==== Mirandette Farm ====
The Mirandette farm works, in particular, on soil conservation (plant cover, direct seeding, etc.) and customized irrigation.

=== Water ===
==== Neste Canal ====
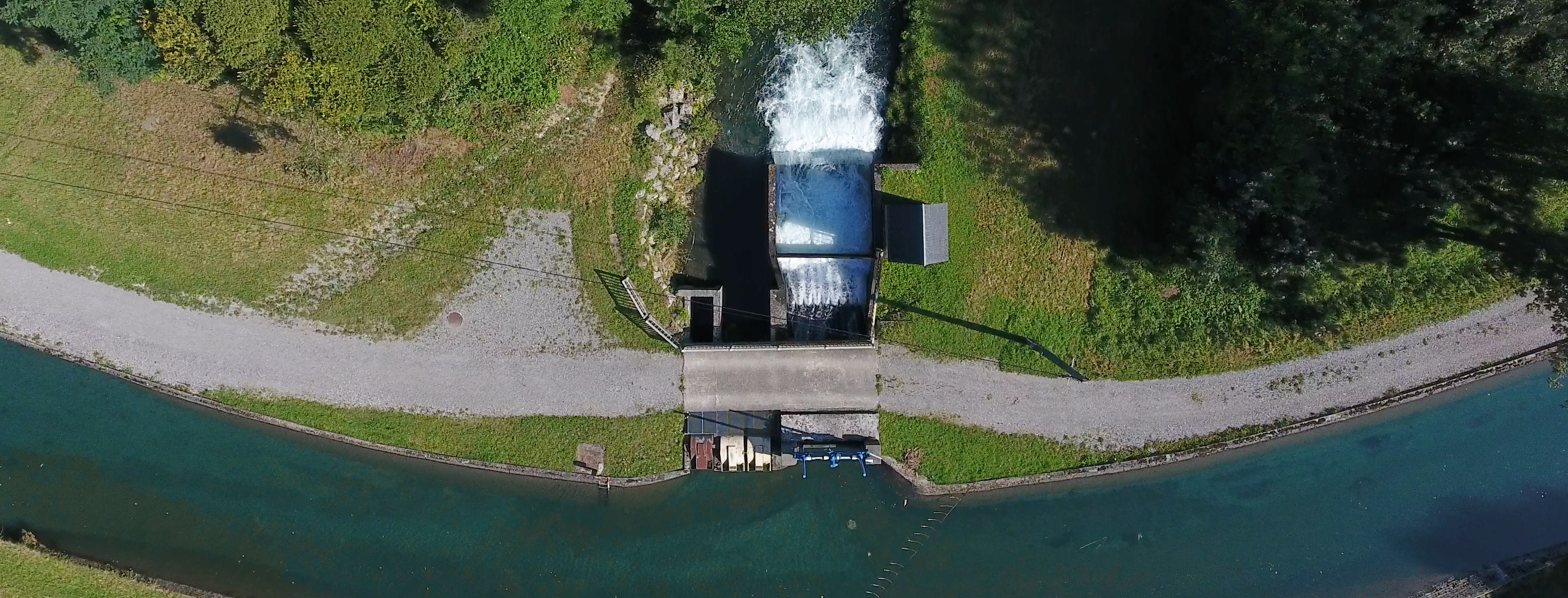
River Gers intake on the Neste canal - Lannemezan (65)

The Neste canal feeds the Neste system. Since 1990, it has been managed by CACG under a state concession.

Built between 1848 and 1862, it guarantees the water supply to Gascony. A territory of 8,400 km^{2} (3,200 sq mi) straddling 5 departments: Hautes-Pyrénées, Gers, Haute-Garonne, Lot-et-Garonne, and Tarn-et-Garonne.It transports water from the Aure valley to users via a vast network comprising 1,350 km (840 mi) of rivers, 90 km (56 mi) of ditches, several lakes. The water for the canal and the 17 rivers it feeds comes from the Neste, from the Sarrancolin water intake at Beyrède-Jumet. (65).

==== Fourogue Dam ====
This structure, which straddles the communes of Mailhoc and Cagnac-les-Mines, was built and operated in the Tarn region by CACG from 1998 to 2020. Its construction was attacked by its opponents and condemned in 1997 by the administrative court. Although the ruling required the work to be stopped, the Albi public prosecutor refused to stop the work. The prefect issued a stop-work order, but did not enforce it. In the end, the illegality of the construction was confirmed by the Bordeaux Administrative Court of Appeal in 2005.

It was the subject of a new public inquiry in 2015, and of upgrading work in 2018–2019, before being handed back to the departmental council of Tarn in 2020.

==== Sivens Dam ====
In 2014, the strong protest by opponents to the construction of the Sivens dam drew attention to CACG. On November 5, le Canard enchaîné noted that the majority of its board members were elected representatives from the general and regional councils of Nouvelle-Aquitaine and Occitanie, which is likely to constitute a conflict of interest, as the same people "ayant l'idée d'un projet, en étudient la faisabilité, le votent et en possèdent la maîtrise d'ouvrage" ("have the idea for a project, study its feasibility, vote on it and are in charge of it") through different structures.

In 2001 and 2009, CACG carried out feasibility studies for the Sivens dam. Following these studies, the Tarn General Council appointed the same CACG to act as project manager for the Sivens dam. On September 29, 2014, the French Ministry of Ecology, Sustainable Development and Energy asked two experts, Corps of Bridges, Waters and Forests, to write a report on the subject. This report, without calling into question the need to store water in the Tescou valley, recommends several improvements in particular to update water demand and study storage variants. Since then, a territorial project has been underway to reconcile agricultural and environmental issues.

==== Lake Puydarrieux ====
The Puydarrieux dam was opened in 1987, forming the lac de Puydarrieux. In addition to the uses common to the Neste system (environment, economy, drinking water), it is also a passover and wintering area for some 240 bird species.

== Critiques ==
=== Business model ===
CACG's business model, based essentially on corn irrigation, is structurally loss-making and dependent on public subsidies. Its debt is high, and the organization was on the verge of bankruptcy in 2023. This was averted by a bailout from local authorities and a massive recapitalization of €24,000,000 (US$25,950,447.06) of public money. In 2019, Occitanie's Regional Chamber of Accounts warned of the company's poor management.

As early as 1998, it was behind the promotion of irrigation reservoirs, or controversial replacement reservoirs in the Poitevin marshlands.

=== Condemnations ===
The company was condemned in 2016 for having taken samples from the Gimone river in excess of authorized standards., and in 2019 for the Midou.

In 2021, the company was condemned on the same grounds. CACG had unsuccessfully challenged the prosecution in its entirety, implicating the French Office for Biodiversity and bringing a case of legitimate suspicion against the public prosecutor's office.

== See also ==
- Barrage de Sivens
- Compagnie d'aménagement du Bas-Rhône et du Languedoc
- Société du canal de Provence
- Office d’équipement hydraulique de Corse
