= Arrats =

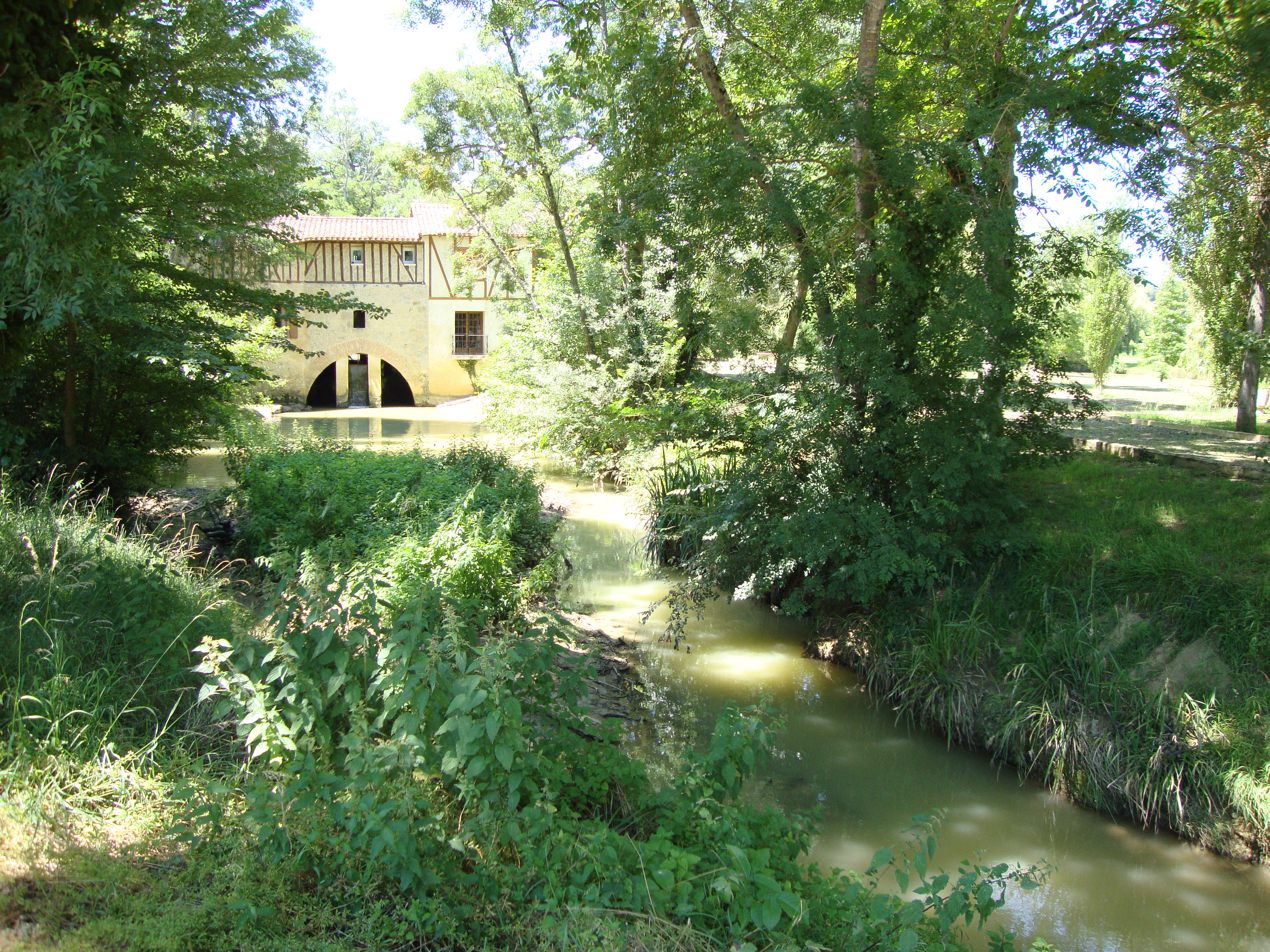
- The river in L'Isle-Arné

- Location within France Location within Occitanie

Location
- Country: France

Physical characteristics
- Source
  - location: Plateau de Lannemezan
- Mouth
  - location: Garonne
  - coordinates: 44°5′42″N 0°50′48″E
- Length: 162 km (101 mi)

Basin features
- Progression: Garonne→ Gironde estuary→ Atlantic Ocean
- Tributaries
  - right: Arrats de devant

The Arrats is a 162 km (101 mi) long river in southern France, left tributary of the Garonne. Its source is in the northern foothills of the Pyrenees, near Sariac-Magnoac. It flows north through the following départements and towns:

- Hautes-Pyrénées
- Gers: Castelnau-Barbarens, Aubiet, Mauvezin, Saint-Clar
- Tarn-et-Garonne: Saint-Loup

It flows into the Garonne near Valence, between Castelsarrasin and Agen.

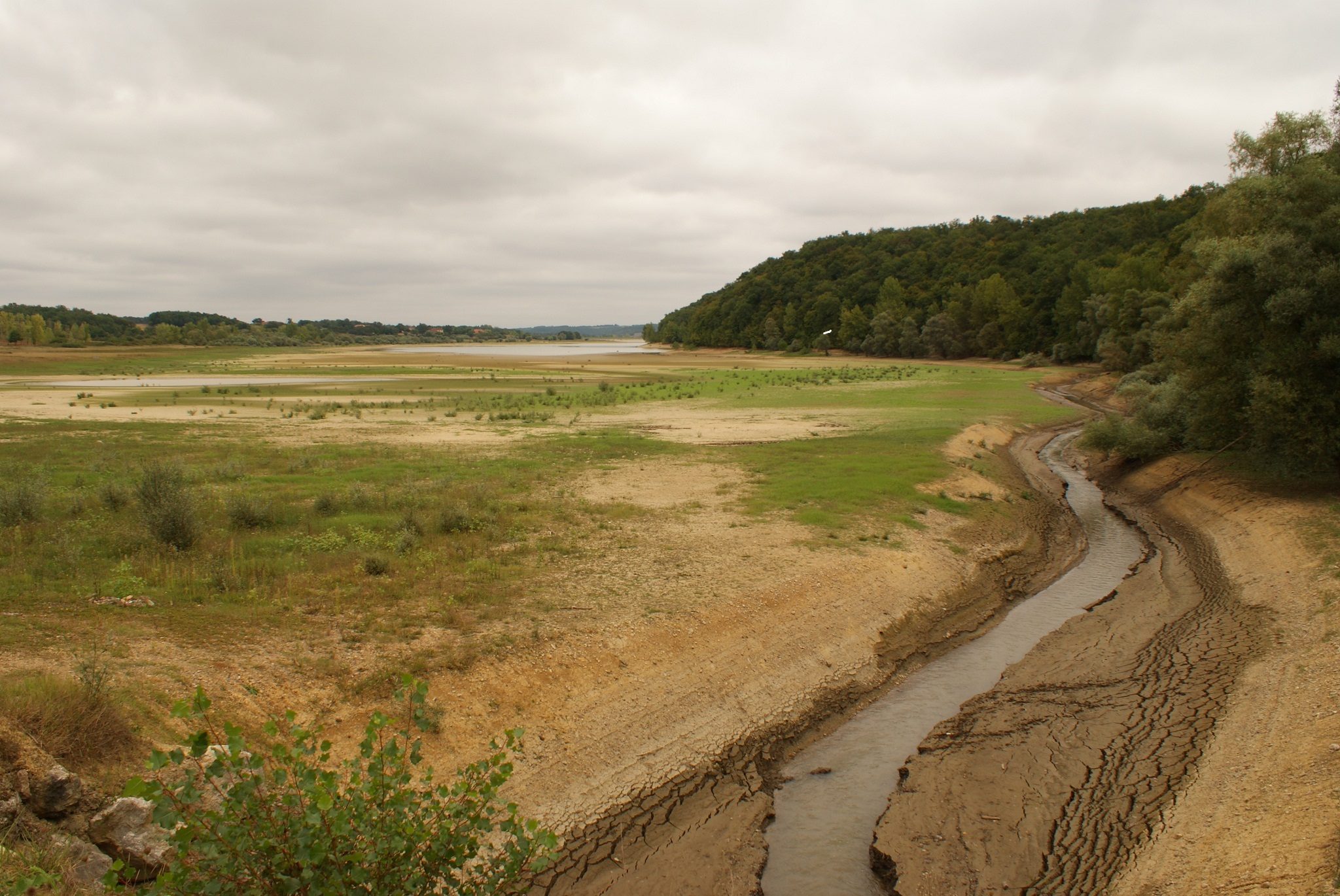
The Arrats flowing into the Réservoir de l'Astarac
