= Betbèze =

- Commune
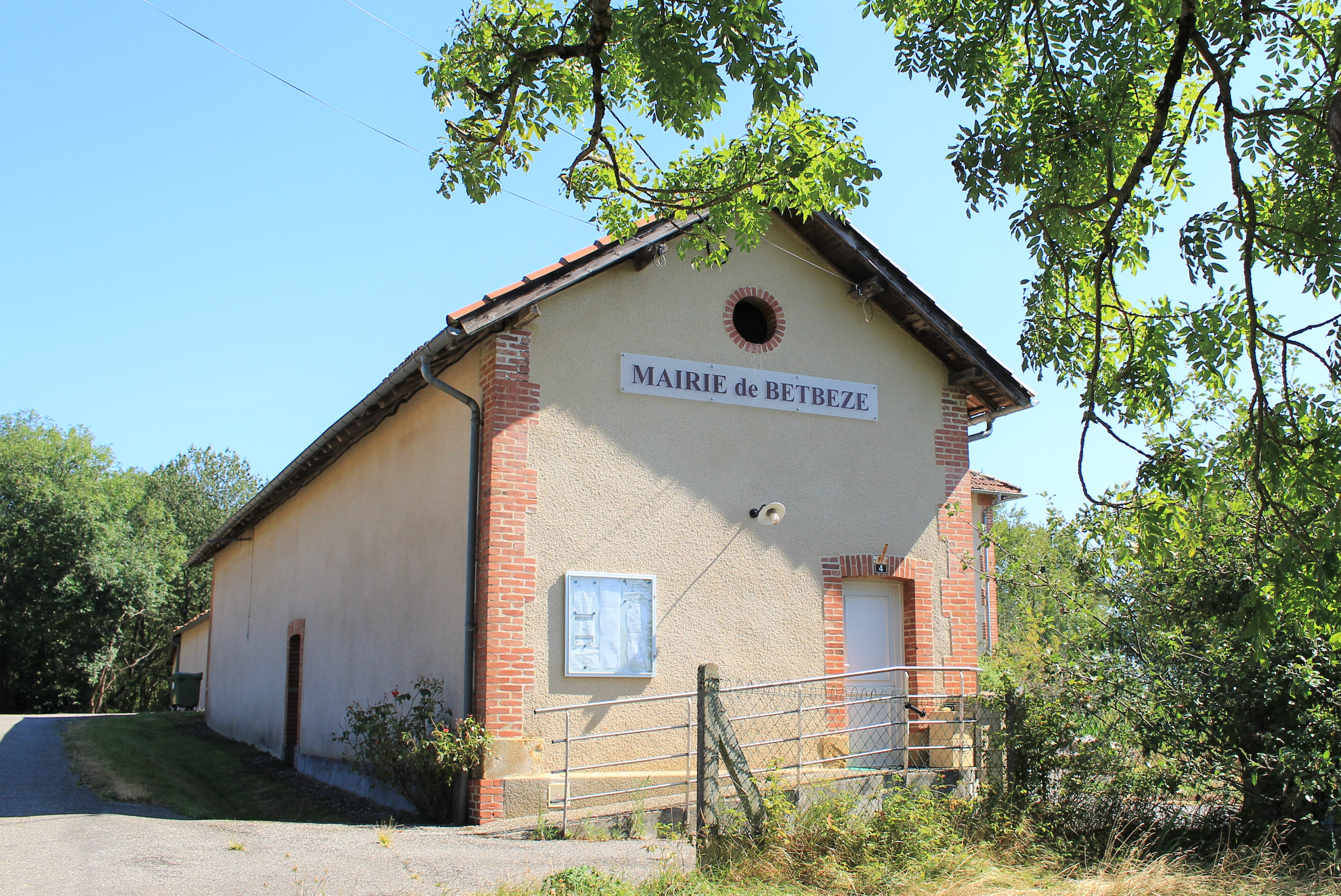
- Town hall

- Coat of arms
- Location of Betbèze
- Location within France Location within Occitanie
- Coordinates: 43°17′08″N 0°34′22″E
- Country: France
- Region: Occitania
- Department: Hautes-Pyrénées
- Arrondissement: Tarbes
- Canton: Les Coteaux

Government
  - Mayor (2020–2026): Christian Dutrey
- Area^{1}: 3.45 km^{2} (1.33 sq mi)
- Elevation: 427 m (1,401 ft)
- Highest elevation: 428 m (1,404 ft)
- Lowest elevation: 270 m (890 ft)
- Population (2023): 42
  - Density: 12/km^{2} (32/sq mi)
- Time zone: UTC+01:00 (CET)
  - Summer (DST): UTC+02:00 (CEST)
- INSEE/Postal code: 65088 /65230
- ^{1} French Land Register data, which excludes lakes, ponds, glaciers > 1 km^{2} (0.386 sq mi or 247 acres) and river estuaries.

Betbèze (French pronunciation: [bɛtbɛz]; Occitan: Bèthvéser) is a commune in the Hautes-Pyrénées department in southwestern France.

== Population ==
Historical population
Year	Pop.	±% p.a.
1968	58	—
1975	48	−2.67%
1982	38	−3.28%
1990	43	+1.56%
1999	41	−0.53%
2007	45	+1.17%
2012	44	−0.45%
2017	45	+0.45%
2023	42	−1.14%
Source: INSEE

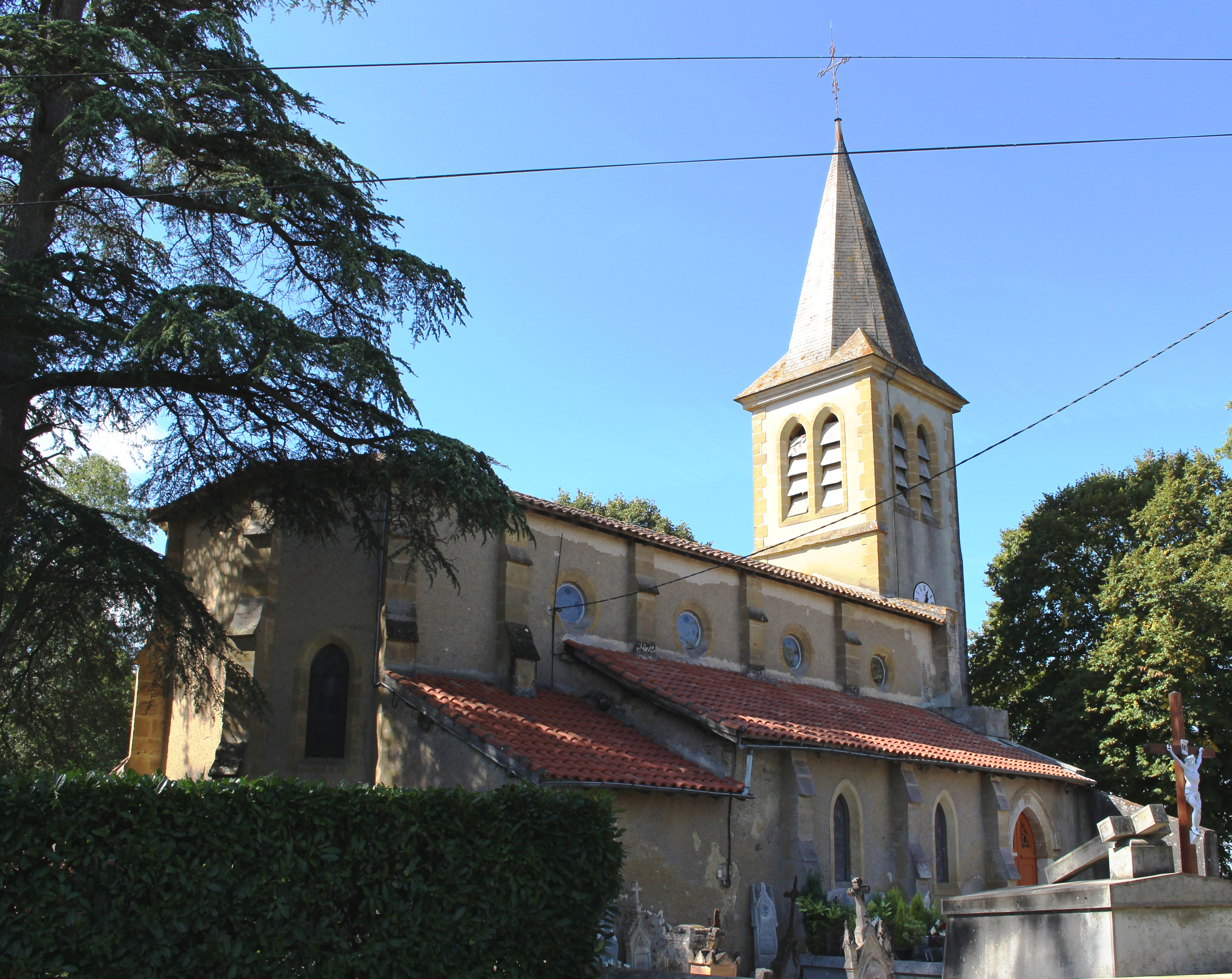
Saint-Jean-Baptiste Church in Betbèze

== See also ==
- Communes of the Hautes-Pyrénées department
