= Lisle-sur-Tarn =

- Commune
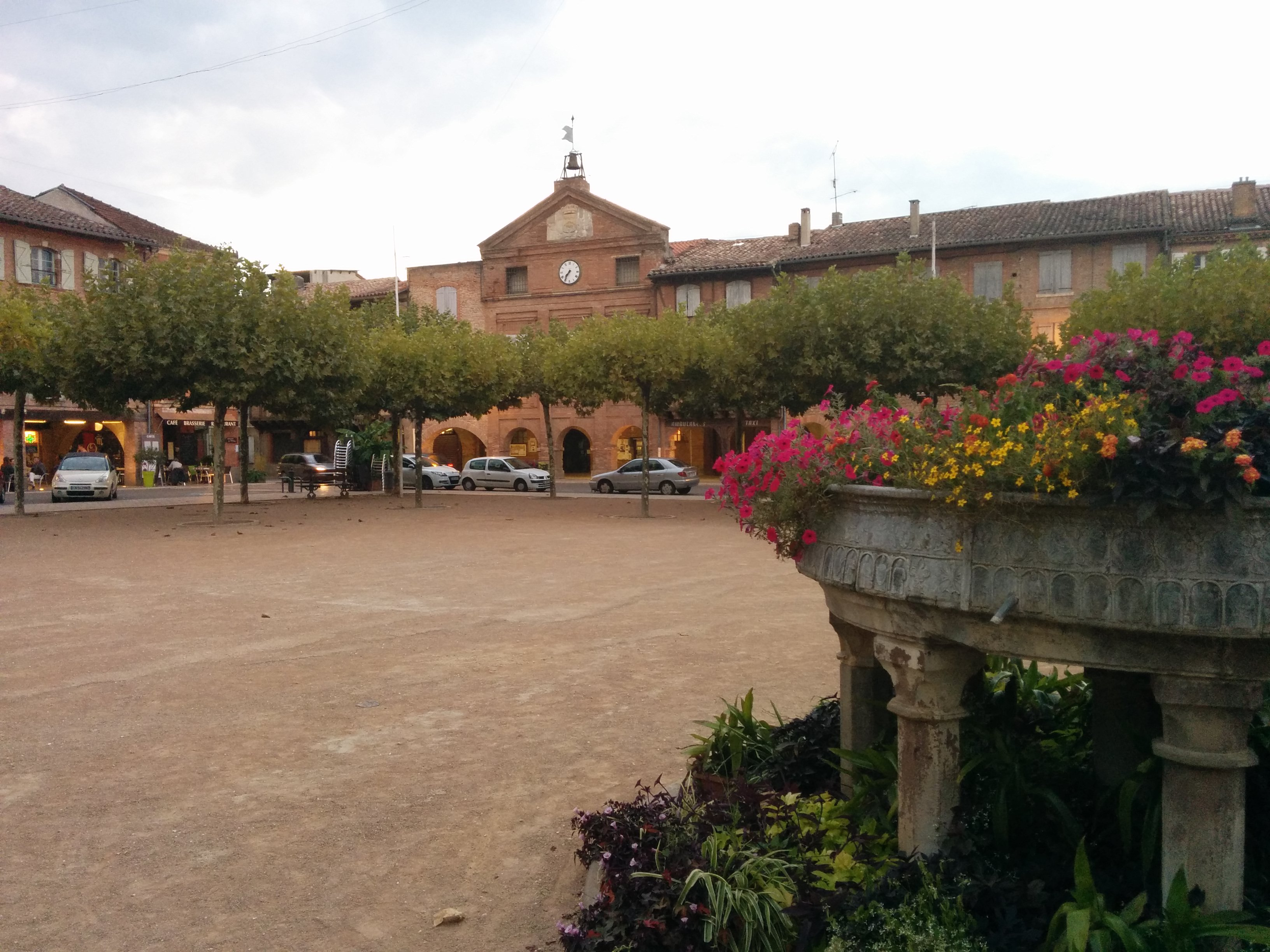
- The main square in Lisle-sur-Tarn

- Coat of arms
- Location of Lisle-sur-Tarn
- Location within France Location within Occitanie
- Coordinates: 43°51′16″N 1°48′42″E
- Country: France
- Region: Occitania
- Department: Tarn
- Arrondissement: Albi
- Canton: Vignobles et Bastides
- Intercommunality: CA Gaillac-Graulhet

Government
  - Mayor (2020–2026): Maryline Lherm
- Area^{1}: 86.56 km^{2} (33.42 sq mi)
- Elevation: 127 m (417 ft)
- Highest elevation: 285 m (935 ft)
- Lowest elevation: 95 m (312 ft)
- Population (2023): 4,939
  - Density: 57.06/km^{2} (147.8/sq mi)
- Time zone: UTC+01:00 (CET)
  - Summer (DST): UTC+02:00 (CEST)
- INSEE/Postal code: 81145 /81310
- ^{1} French Land Register data, which excludes lakes, ponds, glaciers > 1 km^{2} (0.386 sq mi or 247 acres) and river estuaries.

Lisle-sur-Tarn (French pronunciation: [lil syʁ taʁn]; Occitan: L'Illa d'Albigés) is a commune in the Tarn department in southern France.

== Geography ==
Lisle-sur-Tarn sits along the A68 motorway, halfway between Toulouse and Albi, within the Gaillac wine region and next to the Tarn river. Historically speaking, it is also located on one of the ancient Ways of St. James.

== History ==
Lisle-sur-Tarn was founded as a bastide (fortified town) by Raymond VII, Count of Toulouse, in the 13th century, following the destruction of the nearby castle of Montagut by the crusaders during the Albigensian Crusade. Thanks to local products like pastel (a local cake) and Gaillac wine, the city was developed into a vibrant market town with a busy river port along the Tarn. This extensive heritage, in a region that is still producing wine nowadays, plays an important role in the local tourism-oriented economy.

== Demography ==
Historical population
| Year | Pop. | ±% p.a. |
|---|---|---|
| 1968 | 3,376 | — |
| 1975 | 3,385 | +0.04% |
| 1982 | 3,413 | +0.12% |
| 1990 | 3,588 | +0.63% |
| 1999 | 3,683 | +0.29% |
| 2007 | 4,171 | +1.57% |
| 2012 | 4,379 | +0.98% |
| 2017 | 4,694 | +1.40% |
| 2023 | 4,939 | +0.85% |
Source: INSEE

== Transport ==
Lisle-sur-Tarn station has rail connections to Toulouse, Aurillac, Albi and Rodez.

== Notable facts ==
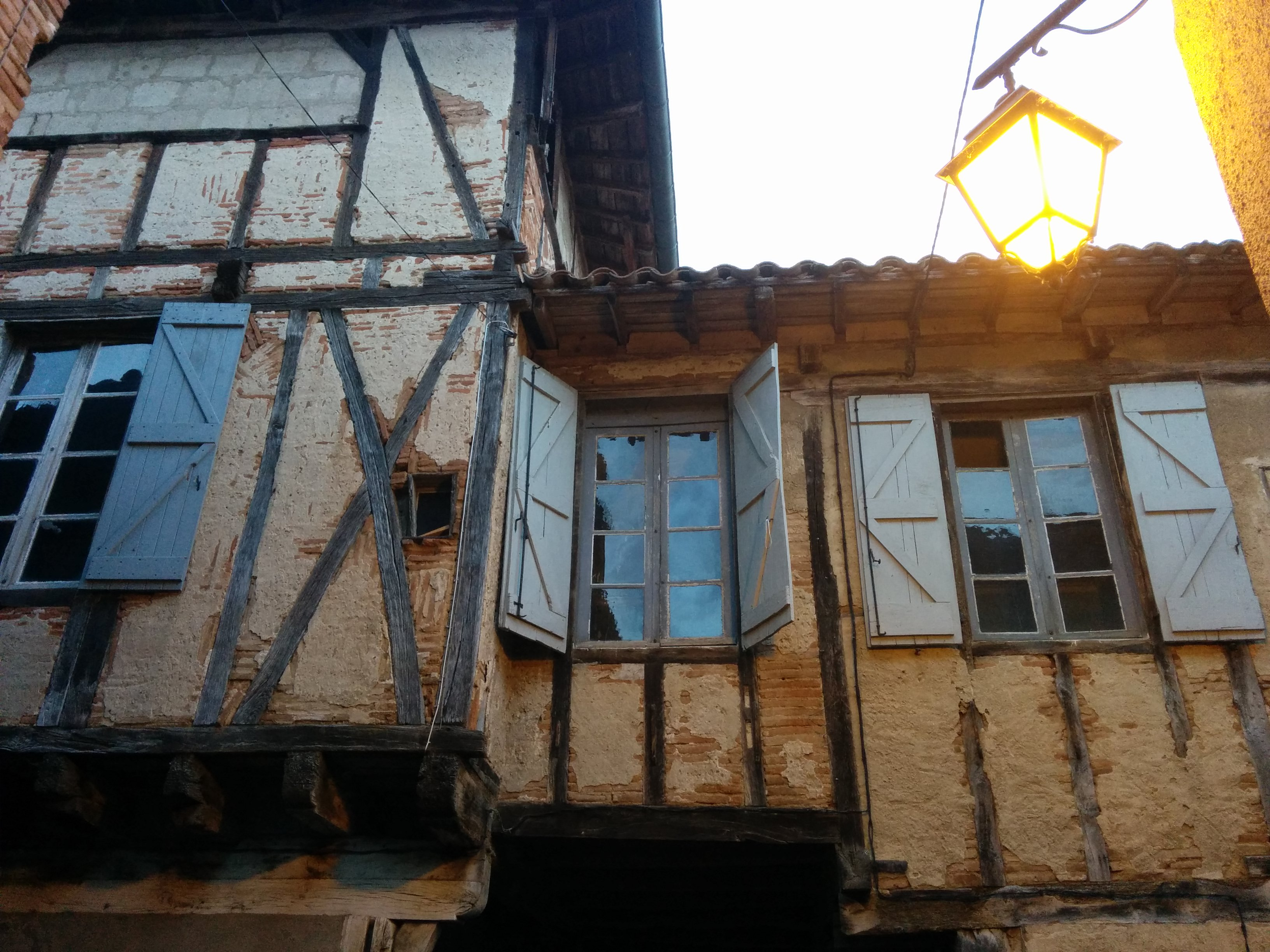
Lisle-sur-Tarn has a large number of period properties

The town's grid-like layout includes straight, uniform streets lined with half-timbered, red-brick houses. The town is made up of four districts, each of which is enclosed by a fortified gate. The market square is the largest of all the south-western bastides, with about 5,000 m^{2}. It was renovated in 2000. The town has a museum on the main square to the artist Raymond Lafage.

== Trivia ==
Lisle-sur-Tarn is featured in the novel The Virgin Blue by Tracy Chevalier.

== See also ==
- Communes of the Tarn department
- Sivens Dam
- Tourism in Tarn
