= Bézues-Bajon =

- Commune
- Coat of arms
- Location of Bézues-Bajon
- Location within France Location within Occitanie
- Coordinates: 43°23′08″N 0°36′00″E
- Country: France
- Region: Occitania
- Department: Gers
- Arrondissement: Mirande
- Canton: Astarac-Gimone
- Intercommunality: Val de Gers

Government
  - Mayor (2020–2026): Pierre Lafforgue
- Area^{1}: 12.86 km^{2} (4.97 sq mi)
- Elevation: 307 m (1,007 ft)
- Highest elevation: 314 m (1,030 ft)
- Lowest elevation: 220 m (720 ft)
- Population (2023): 188
  - Density: 14.6/km^{2} (37.9/sq mi)
- Time zone: UTC+01:00 (CET)
  - Summer (DST): UTC+02:00 (CEST)
- INSEE/Postal code: 32053 /32140
- ^{1} French Land Register data, which excludes lakes, ponds, glaciers > 1 km^{2} (0.386 sq mi or 247 acres) and river estuaries.

Bézues-Bajon (French pronunciation: [bezy baʒɔ̃]; Occitan: Besuas e Bajon) is a commune in the Gers department in southwestern France.

== Geography ==
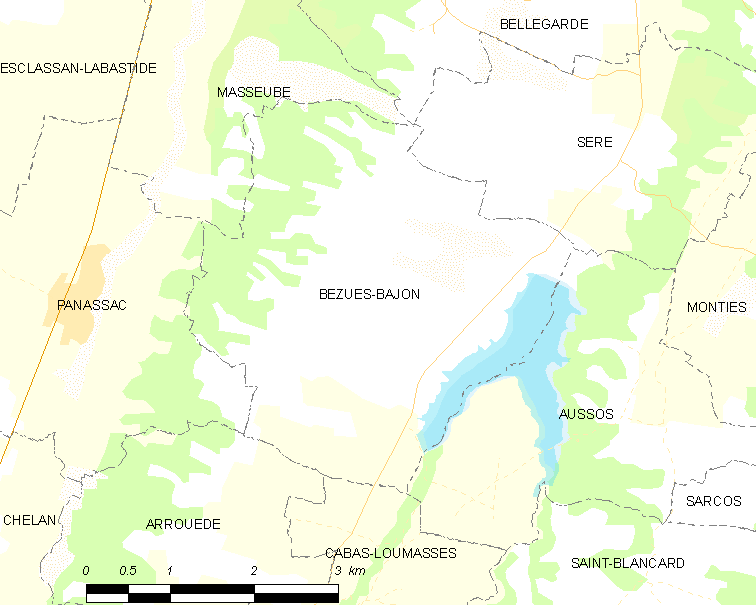
Bézues-Bajon and its surrounding communes

== Population ==
Historical population
Year	Pop.	±% p.a.
1968	221	—
1975	149	−5.48%
1982	154	+0.47%
1990	145	−0.75%
1999	183	+2.62%
2007	207	+1.55%
2012	208	+0.10%
2017	190	−1.79%
2023	188	−0.18%
Source: INSEE

== See also ==
- Communes of the Gers department
