= Aussos =

- Commune
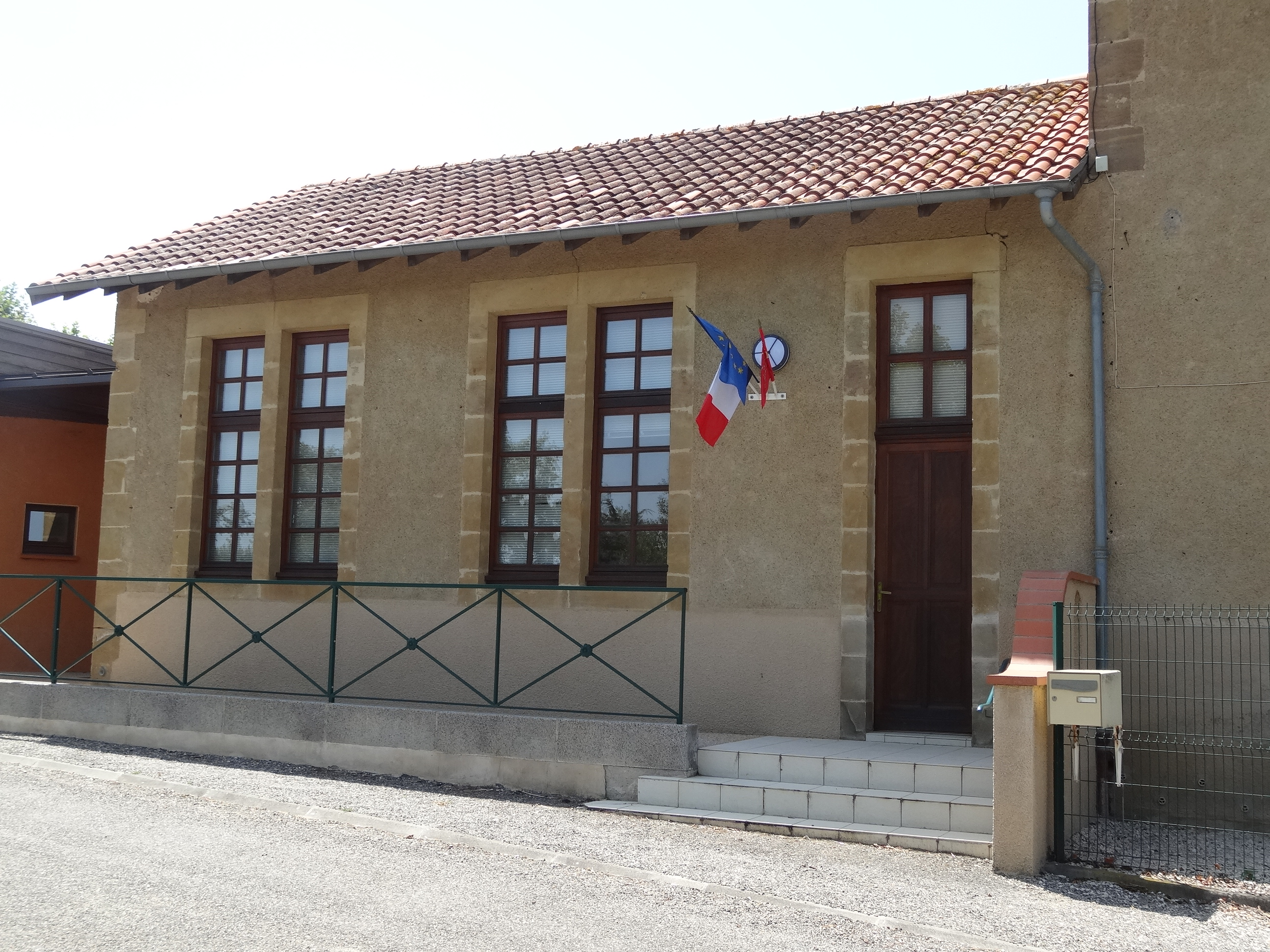
- The town hall in Aussos
- Location of Aussos
- Location within France Location within Occitanie
- Coordinates: 43°22′34″N 0°39′12″E
- Country: France
- Region: Occitania
- Department: Gers
- Arrondissement: Mirande
- Canton: Astarac-Gimone
- Intercommunality: CC Val Gers

Government
  - Mayor (2020–2026): Gaële Giacomin
- Area^{1}: 7.86 km^{2} (3.03 sq mi)
- Elevation: 345 m (1,132 ft)
- Highest elevation: 346 m (1,135 ft)
- Lowest elevation: 232 m (761 ft)
- Population (2023): 64
  - Density: 8.1/km^{2} (21/sq mi)
- Time zone: UTC+01:00 (CET)
  - Summer (DST): UTC+02:00 (CEST)
- INSEE/Postal code: 32468 /32140
- ^{1} French Land Register data, which excludes lakes, ponds, glaciers > 1 km^{2} (0.386 sq mi or 247 acres) and river estuaries.

Aussos is a commune in the Gers department in southwestern France. Between 1822 and 1949, it was united with Monties in the commune Monties-Aussos.

== Population ==
Historical population
Year	Pop.	±% p.a.
1968	114	—
1975	89	−3.47%
1982	70	−3.37%
1990	73	+0.53%
1999	77	+0.59%
2007	57	−3.69%
2012	67	+3.29%
2017	81	+3.87%
2023	64	−3.85%
Source: INSEE

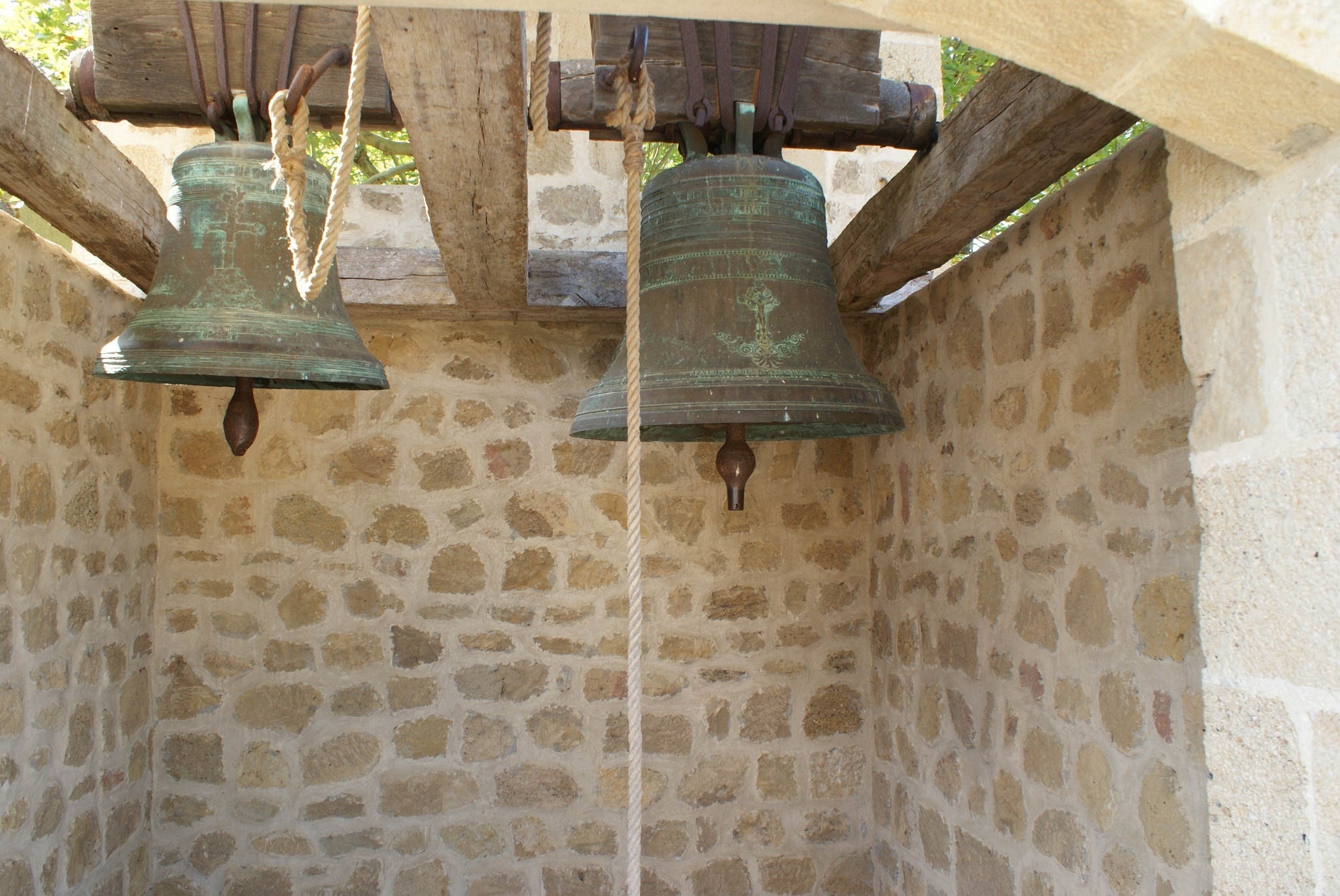
Bell tower

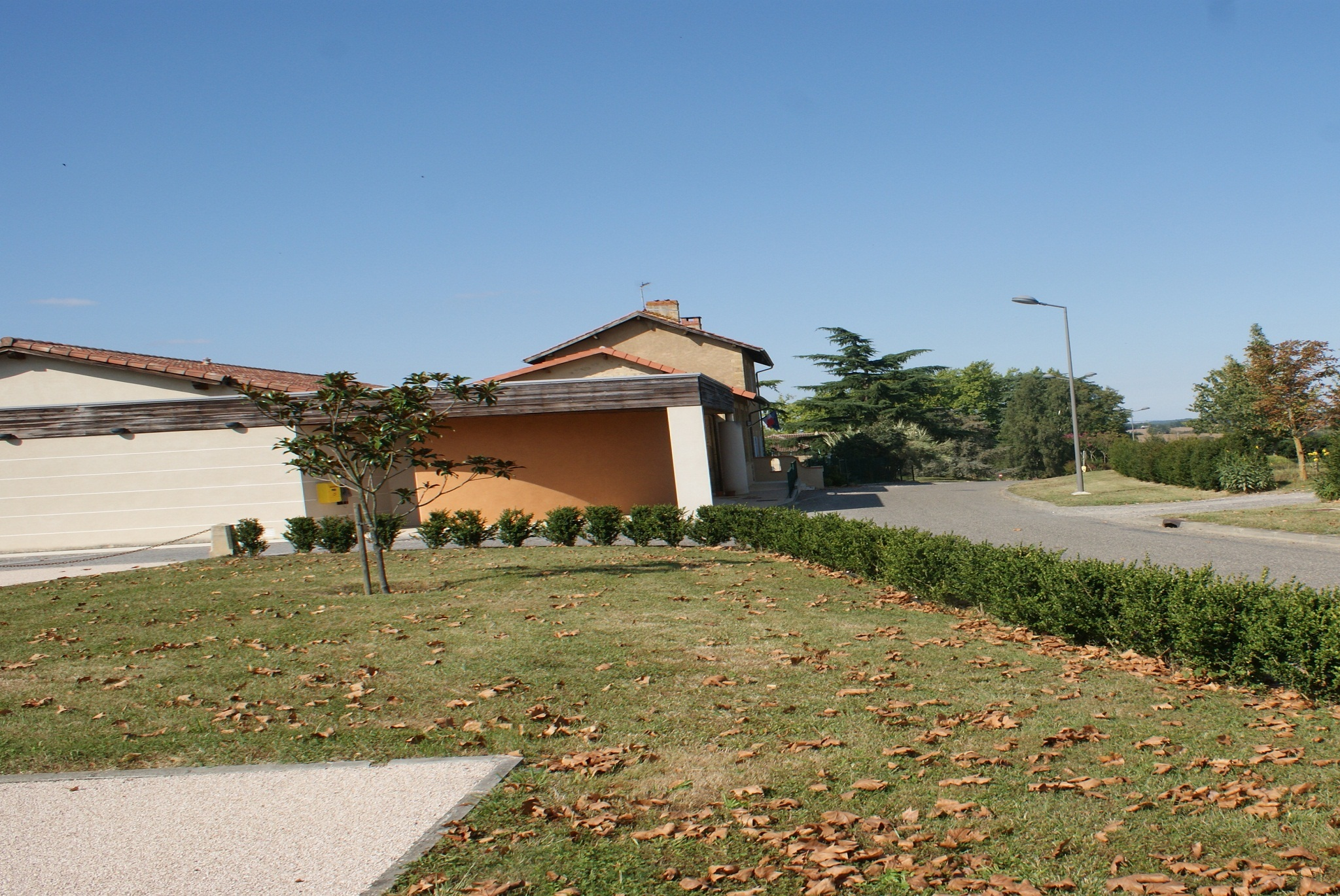
Town hall

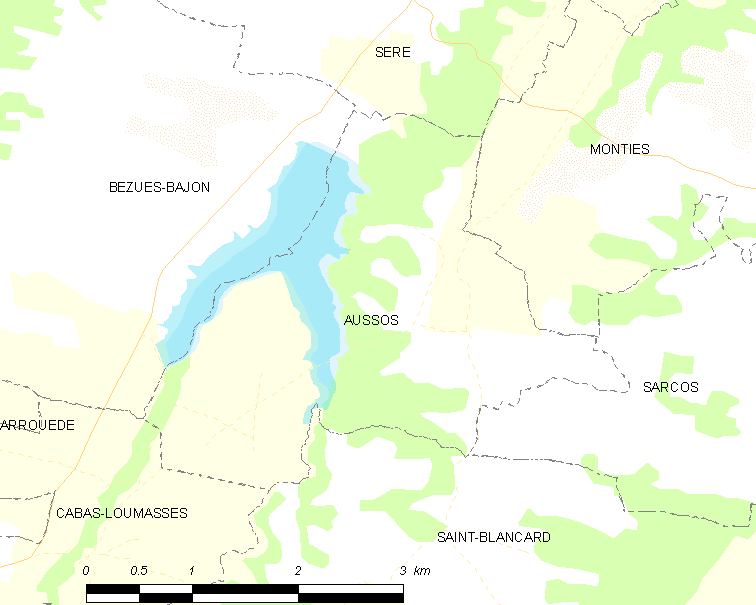
Map of Aussos and its surrounding communes

== See also ==
- Communes of the Gers department
