= Osmets =

- Commune
- Coat of arms
- Location of Osmets
- Location within France Location within Occitanie
- Coordinates: 43°18′23″N 0°15′59″E
- Country: France
- Region: Occitania
- Department: Hautes-Pyrénées
- Arrondissement: Tarbes
- Canton: Les Coteaux
- Intercommunality: Pays de Trie et Magnoac

Government
  - Mayor (2020–2026): Eric Piqué
- Area^{1}: 4.88 km^{2} (1.88 sq mi)
- Elevation: 250 m (820 ft)
- Highest elevation: 394 m (1,293 ft)
- Lowest elevation: 217 m (712 ft)
- Population (2023): 90
  - Density: 18/km^{2} (48/sq mi)
- Time zone: UTC+01:00 (CET)
  - Summer (DST): UTC+02:00 (CEST)
- INSEE/Postal code: 65342 /65350
- ^{1} French Land Register data, which excludes lakes, ponds, glaciers > 1 km^{2} (0.386 sq mi or 247 acres) and river estuaries.

Osmets is a commune in the Hautes-Pyrénées department in south-west France.

== Geography ==
Osmets is a small hamlet, located between the large towns of Tarbes (west 20 km) and Trie-sur-Baïse (east 10 km) on the D632. Chelle-Debat is to the immediate west and Luby-Betmont to the east on the D632, with Trouley-Labarthe to the northwest on the D44 and Mun to the south.

== Hydrography ==
The Achella encircles Osmets starting in the south east of the commune, before crossing the D632 at the east end of the village, looping north then swinging south again and crossing the D632 again just to the west of the church. The stream continues westward to join the Arros at Chelle-Debat, ultimately joining the Adour and the sea at Bayonne.

== Climate and soil ==
Protected by wooded hills to the east, north and south Osmets has a milder micro climate than adjoining more exposed sites, the soil is a fertile heavy clay, inter dispersed with small outcrops of coarse gravel and large smooth pebbles.

== Patron saint ==
Our Lady of the Assumption, 15 August.

== Historic village names ==
Ausmes (1313, Debita regi Navarre) De Ausmesio, Latin (1342, Pouillé Tarbes) de Asmesio, Latin (1379, Procuration Tarbes) Ausmes, Ausmees (1429, Censier Bigorre) Ausmes (1747, Registres paroissiaux) Ausmés (1768, Duco;1790, Département 1) Osmets (1790, Département 2) Ausmets (End 18th Century Carte de Cassini).

== Administrative history ==
The Seneschal and County of Bigorre, the Quarteron of Rabestans, the Barony of Antin, the Canton of Saint-Sever, then Auberade (1790). Trie sûr Baise since 1801.

== Inhabitants nicknames ==
“Los ahumats” - "the smoked ones" (Enq. C.G. 1986) Osmets was a centre of charcoal making, also “Los enclotats” - "those who live in a sunken place" (at the foot of the hills) (Inq. C.G. 1986 and Rosapelly, around 1910)

== Wildlife ==
The surrounding forest is home to an extensive population of wild boar (Sus scrofa) with deer, badgers (mêles mêlés) and foxes (vulpes vulpes) also present. Grass snakes (Natrix natrix), Aesculapian snakes (Elaphe longissima) and Fire Salamanders (Salamandra salamandra) are all found within a short distance of the Achella.

== Sport ==
The east end of Osmets is the start point for the annual Course de Côte (hill climb), held in May or June. The course is up a steep winding route of 2 km (1.2 mi) on the D632 to Luby-Betmont. (Note that the D632 is closed for the Sunday of this event).

In 2016, the Tour de France passed through Osmets.
