= Arros (river) =

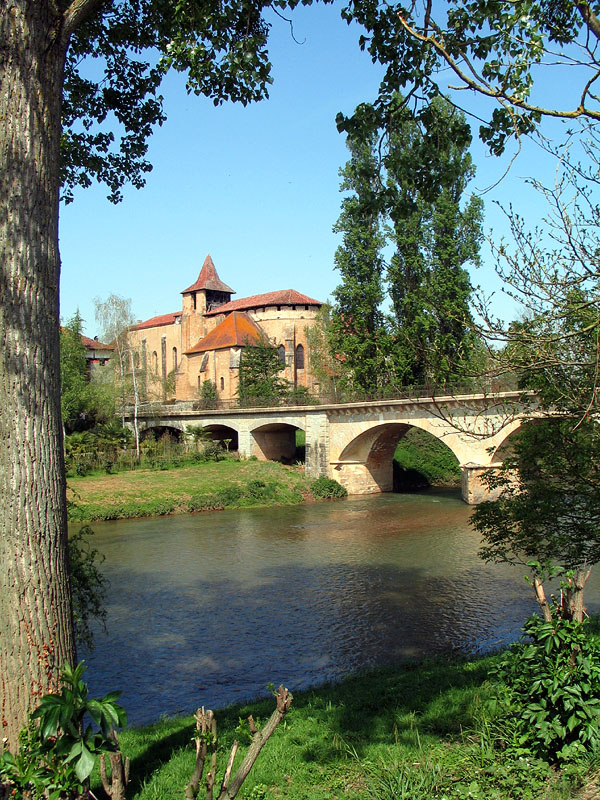
- The Arros in Saint-Sever-de-Rustan

- Location within France Location within Occitanie

Location
- Country: France

Physical characteristics
- Source
  - location: Baronnies of Pyrenees
- Mouth
  - location: Adour
  - coordinates: 43°39′44″N 0°1′41″W
- Length: 130 km (81 mi)
- Basin size: 947 km^{2} (366 sq mi)
- Discharge
  - average: 9 m^{3}/s (320 cu ft/s)

Basin features
- Progression: Adour→ Atlantic Ocean

The Arros (French pronunciation: [aʁɔs]; Occitan: Arròs) is a right tributary of the Adour, in the Southwest of France. It is 130.2 km (80.9 mi) long.

== Name ==
The name Arros is based on the root Arr- 'stone' and the suffix -os.

== Geography ==
The Arros rises in the Baronnies of Pyrenees, southeast of Bagnères-de-Bigorre, below the Signal de Bassia (1 921 m).

It flows north through a narrow valley defended by the castle of Mauvezin and the bastide of Tournay. It joins the Adour before it turn west, upstream from Riscle.

== Départements and towns ==
- Hautes-Pyrénées: Bourg-de-Bigorre, Tournay, Chelle-Debat
- Gers: Montégut-Arros, Villecomtal-sur-Arros, Plaisance.

== Main tributaries ==
- (L) Esqueda, from Banios
- (L) Luz, from Lies
- (L) Arredou, in Tournay
- (L) Arret Daban or Arret Devant,
- (L) Arret Darré, in Gonez
- (R) Bouès, from Capvern
