= Gensac-de-Boulogne =

- Commune
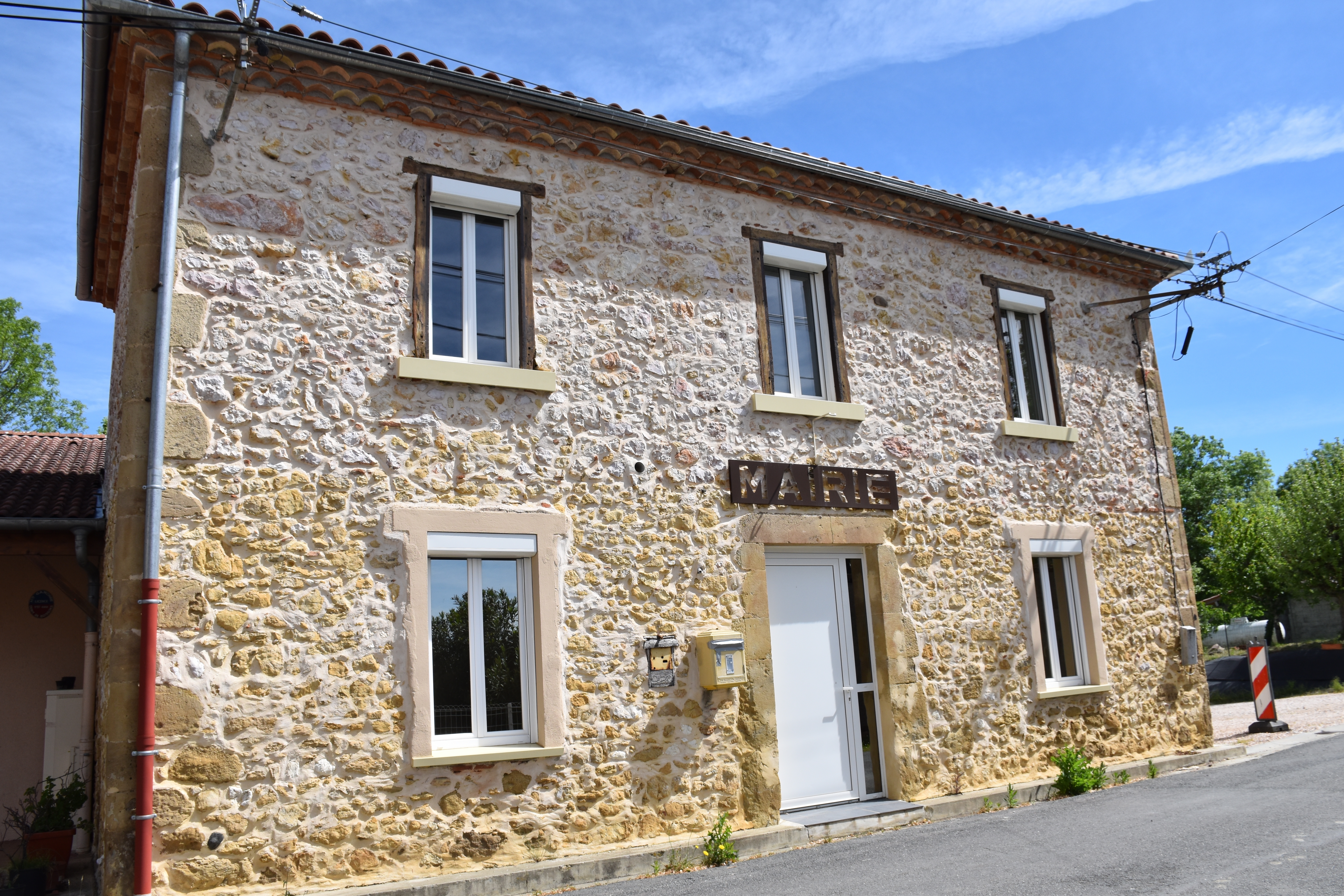
- Gensac-de-Boulogne Town hall
- Location of Gensac-de-Boulogne
- Location within France Location within Occitanie
- Coordinates: 43°15′14″N 0°35′15″E
- Country: France
- Region: Occitania
- Department: Haute-Garonne
- Arrondissement: Saint-Gaudens
- Canton: Saint-Gaudens

Government
  - Mayor (2020–2026): Daniel Sabathe
- Area^{1}: 10.96 km^{2} (4.23 sq mi)
- Elevation: 400 m (1,300 ft)
- Highest elevation: 438 m (1,437 ft)
- Lowest elevation: 289 m (948 ft)
- Population (2023): 109
  - Density: 9.95/km^{2} (25.8/sq mi)
- Time zone: UTC+01:00 (CET)
  - Summer (DST): UTC+02:00 (CEST)
- INSEE/Postal code: 31218 /31350
- ^{1} French Land Register data, which excludes lakes, ponds, glaciers > 1 km^{2} (0.386 sq mi or 247 acres) and river estuaries.

Gensac-de-Boulogne (French pronunciation: [ʒɑ̃sak də bulɔɲ], literally Gensac of Boulogne; Occitan: Gençac de Bolonha) is a commune in the Haute-Garonne department in southwestern France.

== Geography ==
The river Gesse forms part of the commune's eastern border; the Gimone forms part of its western border.

== Population ==
Historical population
Year	Pop.	±% p.a.
1968	172	—
1975	147	−2.22%
1982	122	−2.63%
1990	117	−0.52%
1999	141	+2.09%
2007	111	−2.95%
2012	113	+0.36%
2017	125	+2.04%
2023	109	−2.26%
Source: INSEE

== See also ==
- Communes of the Haute-Garonne department
