= Nénigan =

- Commune
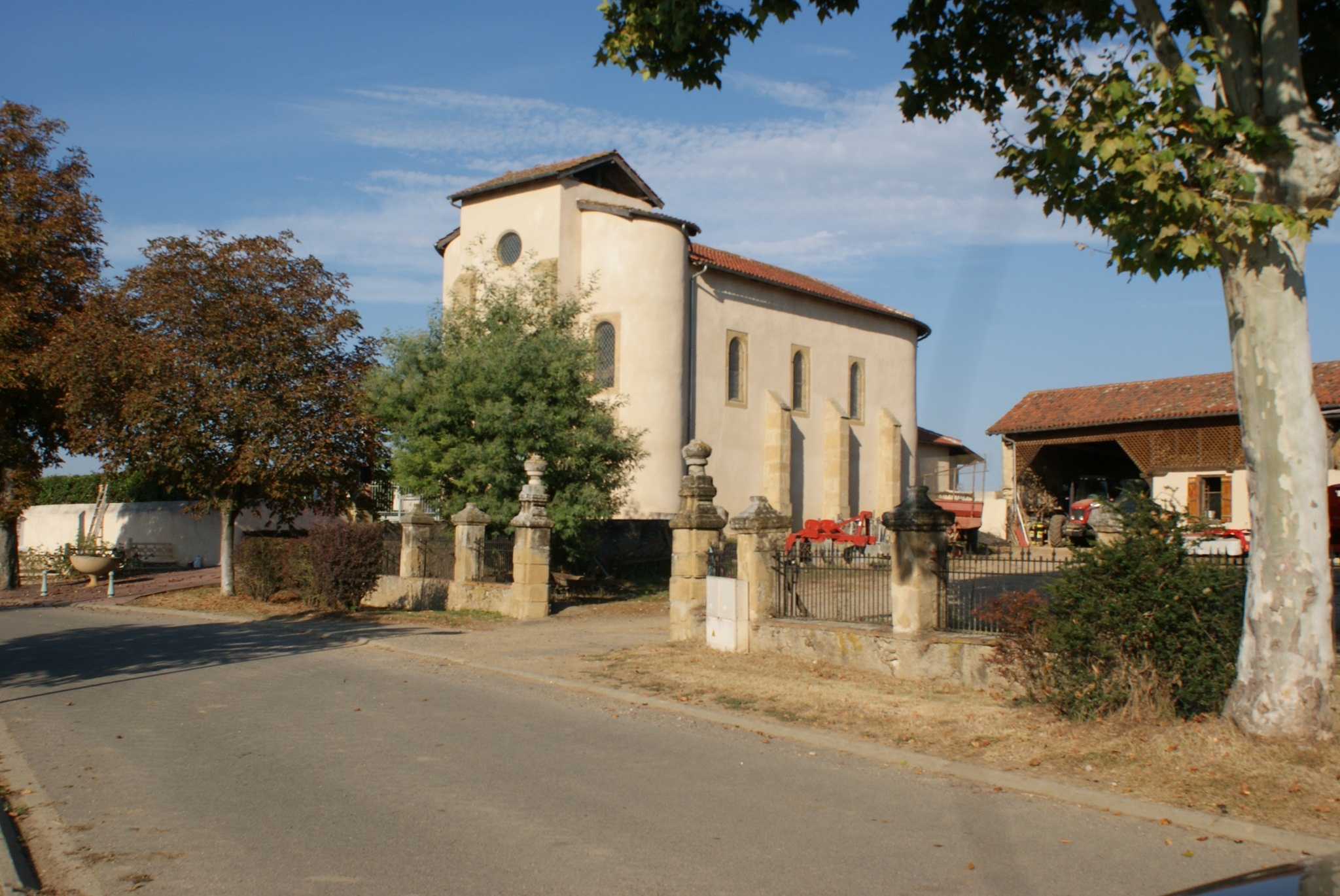
- The church in Nénigan
- Location of Nénigan
- Location within France Location within Occitanie
- Coordinates: 43°21′26″N 0°42′11″E
- Country: France
- Region: Occitania
- Department: Haute-Garonne
- Arrondissement: Saint-Gaudens
- Canton: Saint-Gaudens

Government
  - Mayor (2020–2026): Damien Crespin
- Area^{1}: 2.38 km^{2} (0.92 sq mi)
- Elevation: 297 m (974 ft)
- Highest elevation: 297 m (974 ft)
- Lowest elevation: 213 m (699 ft)
- Population (2023): 51
  - Density: 21/km^{2} (55/sq mi)
- Time zone: UTC+01:00 (CET)
  - Summer (DST): UTC+02:00 (CEST)
- INSEE/Postal code: 31397 /31350
- ^{1} French Land Register data, which excludes lakes, ponds, glaciers > 1 km^{2} (0.386 sq mi or 247 acres) and river estuaries.

Nénigan (French pronunciation: [neniɡɑ̃]; Occitan: Nenigan) is a commune in the Haute-Garonne department in southwestern France.

== Population ==
Historical population
Year	Pop.	±% p.a.
1968	64	—
1975	61	−0.68%
1982	59	−0.48%
1990	59	+0.00%
1999	55	−0.78%
2007	54	−0.23%
2012	57	+1.09%
2017	65	+2.66%
2023	51	−3.96%
Source: INSEE

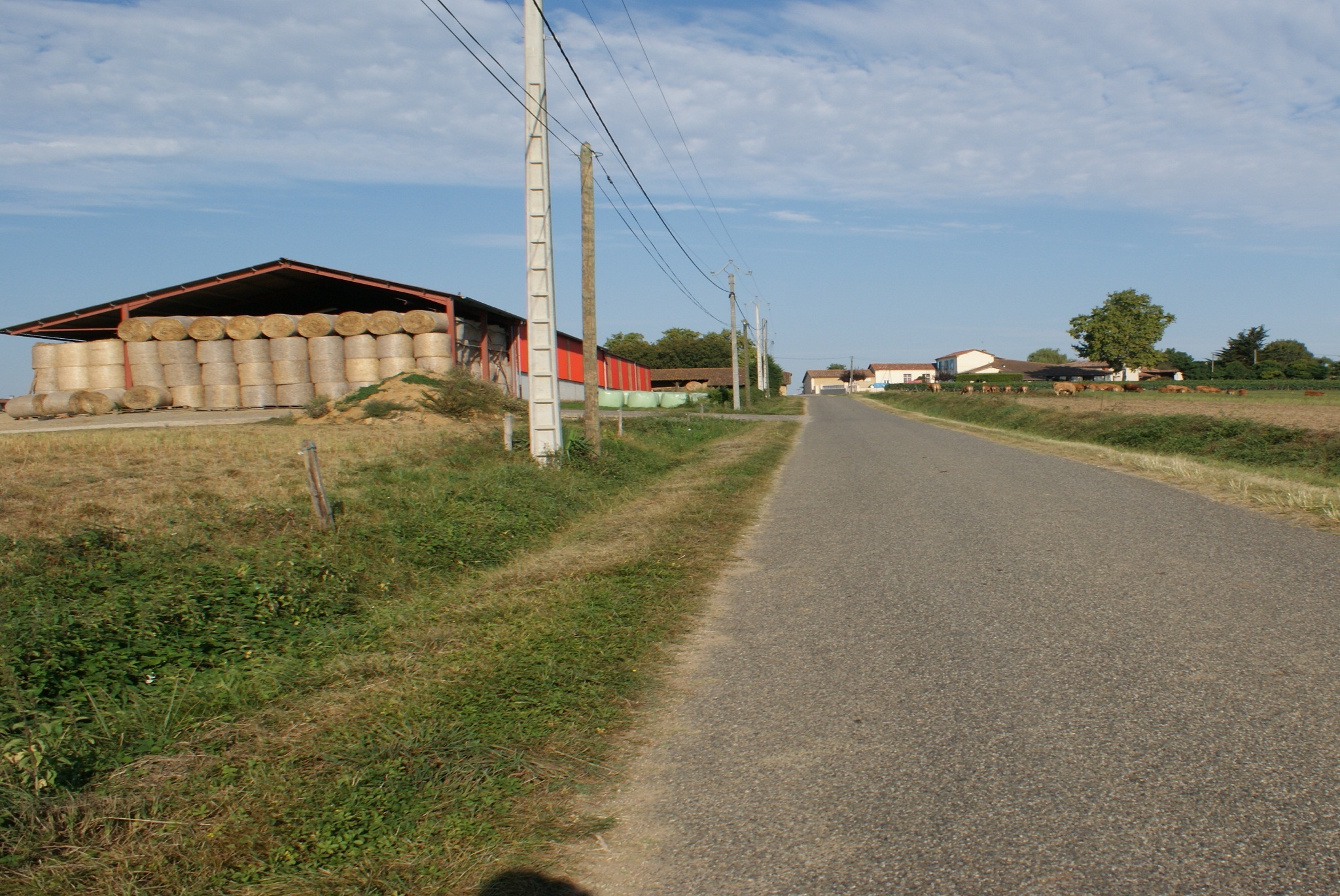
The road D41 in Nénigan

== Geography ==
The river Gesse forms all of the commune's eastern border; the Gimone forms all of its western border.

== See also ==
- Communes of the Haute-Garonne department
