= Sauveterre, Gers =

Sauveterre
- Commune
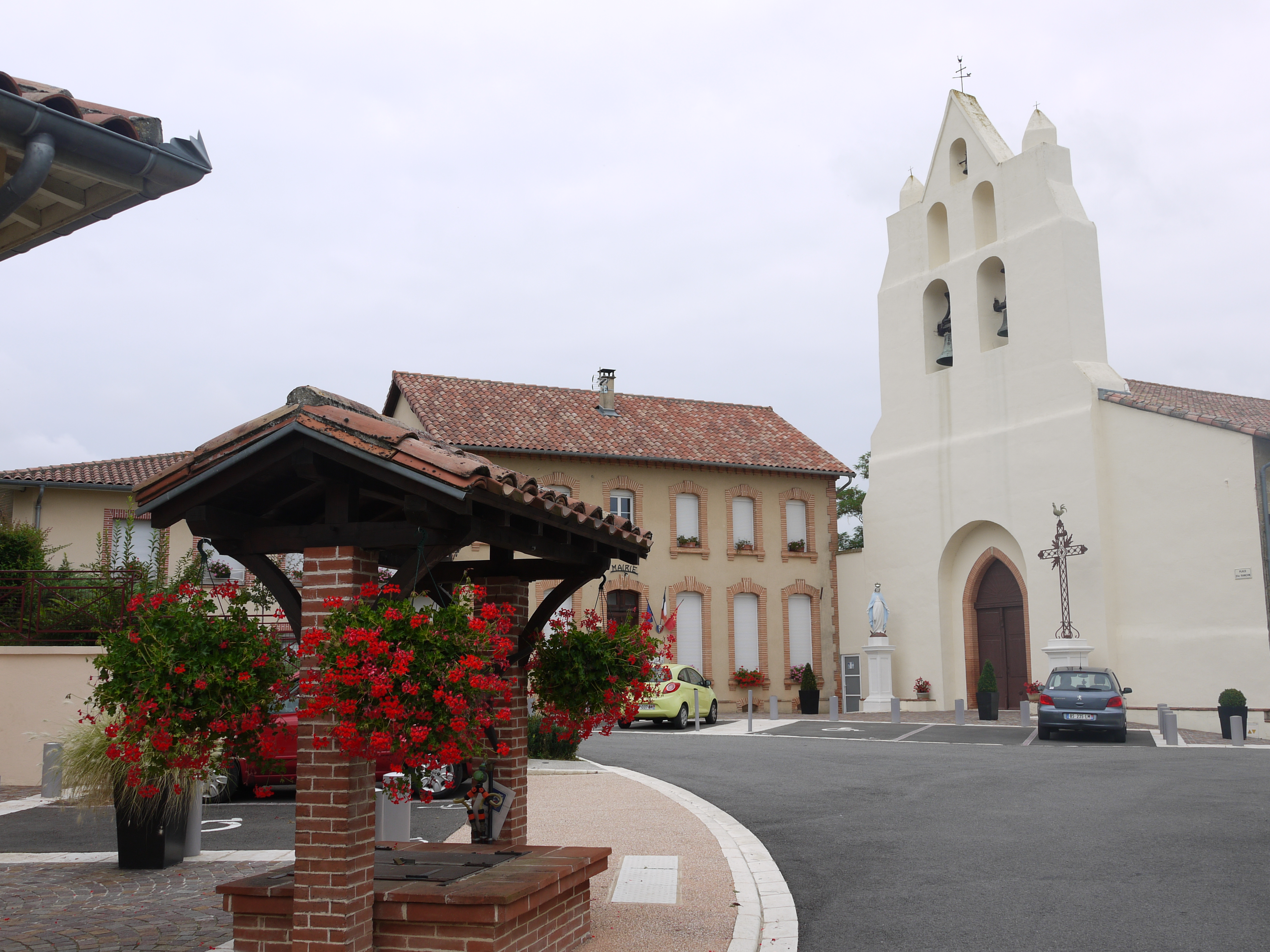
- The church and town hall in Sauveterre
- Location of Sauveterre
- Location within France Location within Occitanie
- Coordinates: 43°27′27″N 0°51′29″E
- Country: France
- Region: Occitania
- Department: Gers
- Arrondissement: Auch
- Canton: Val de Save
- Intercommunality: Savès

Government
  - Mayor (2020–2026): Bernard Lozes
- Area^{1}: 16.45 km^{2} (6.35 sq mi)
- Elevation: 260 m (850 ft)
- Highest elevation: 311 m (1,020 ft)
- Lowest elevation: 170 m (560 ft)
- Population (2023): 278
  - Density: 16.9/km^{2} (43.8/sq mi)
- Time zone: UTC+01:00 (CET)
  - Summer (DST): UTC+02:00 (CEST)
- INSEE/Postal code: 32418 /32220
- ^{1} French Land Register data, which excludes lakes, ponds, glaciers > 1 km^{2} (0.386 sq mi or 247 acres) and river estuaries.

Sauveterre (French pronunciation: [sovtɛʁ]; Occitan: Sauvatèrra) is a commune in the Gers department in southwestern France.

== Geography ==
=== Localisation ===
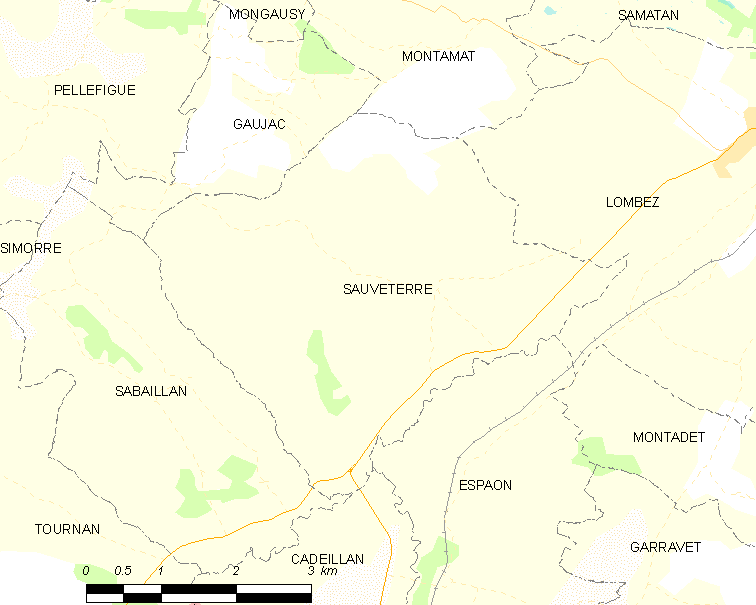
Sauveterre and its surrounding communes

=== Hydrology ===
The river Gesse forms part of the commune's southern border, then flows into the Save, which forms most of its eastern border.

== Population ==
Historical population
Year	Pop.	±% p.a.
1968	326	—
1975	283	−2.00%
1982	264	−0.99%
1990	219	−2.31%
1999	229	+0.50%
2007	232	+0.16%
2012	240	+0.68%
2017	265	+2.00%
2023	278	+0.80%
Source: INSEE

== See also ==
- Communes of the Gers department
