= Save River =

Save River may refer to:

- Save River (Africa) - a river in Africa
- Save (Garonne) - a river in France
- Sava River - a river in the Balkans, also spelt Save in some sources.
