= Espaon =

- Commune
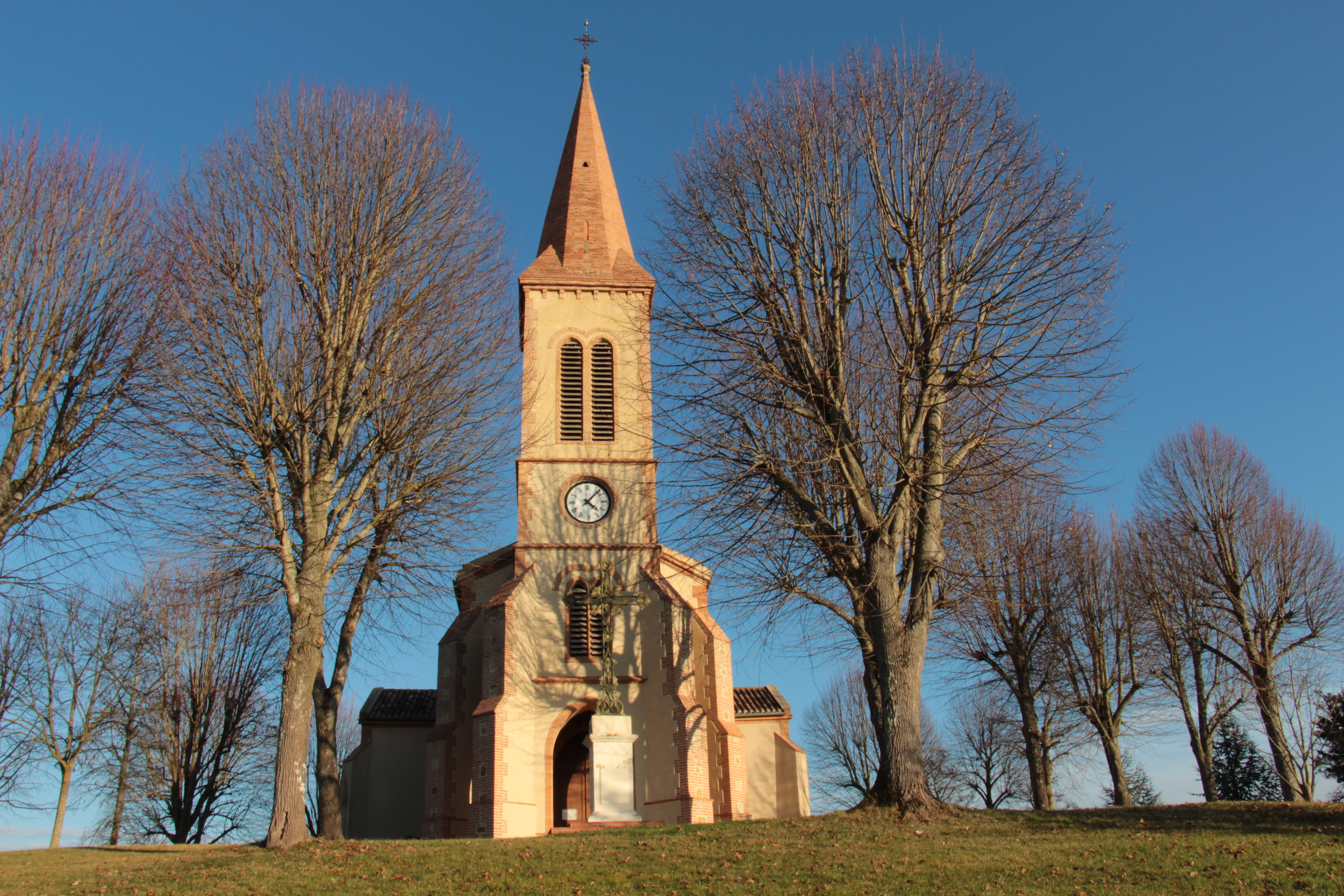
- The church in Espaon
- Location of Espaon
- Location within France Location within Occitanie
- Coordinates: 43°25′16″N 0°51′52″E
- Country: France
- Region: Occitania
- Department: Gers
- Arrondissement: Auch
- Canton: Val de Save
- Intercommunality: Savès

Government
  - Mayor (2020–2026): Jean-Michel Ousset
- Area^{1}: 8.89 km^{2} (3.43 sq mi)
- Elevation: 194 m (636 ft)
- Highest elevation: 299 m (981 ft)
- Lowest elevation: 172 m (564 ft)
- Population (2023): 186
  - Density: 20.9/km^{2} (54.2/sq mi)
- Time zone: UTC+01:00 (CET)
  - Summer (DST): UTC+02:00 (CEST)
- INSEE/Postal code: 32124 /32220
- ^{1} French Land Register data, which excludes lakes, ponds, glaciers > 1 km^{2} (0.386 sq mi or 247 acres) and river estuaries.

Espaon is a commune in the Gers department in southwestern France.

== Geography ==
In the western part of the commune, the river Gesse flows into the Save, which forms most of its western border.

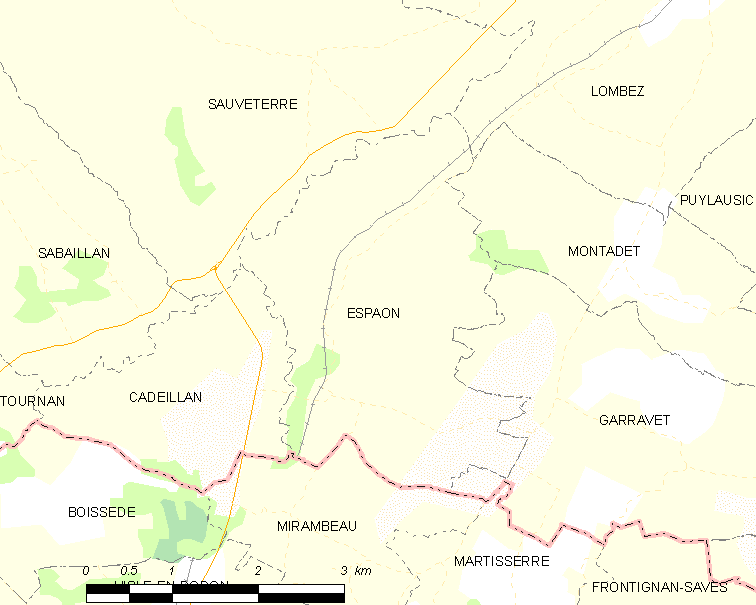
Espaon and its surrounding communes

== Population ==
Historical population
Year	Pop.	±% p.a.
1968	189	—
1975	162	−2.18%
1982	167	+0.44%
1990	161	−0.46%
1999	146	−1.08%
2007	195	+3.68%
2012	186	−0.94%
2017	190	+0.43%
2023	186	−0.35%
Source: INSEE

== See also ==
- Communes of the Gers department
- Savès
