= Bouès =

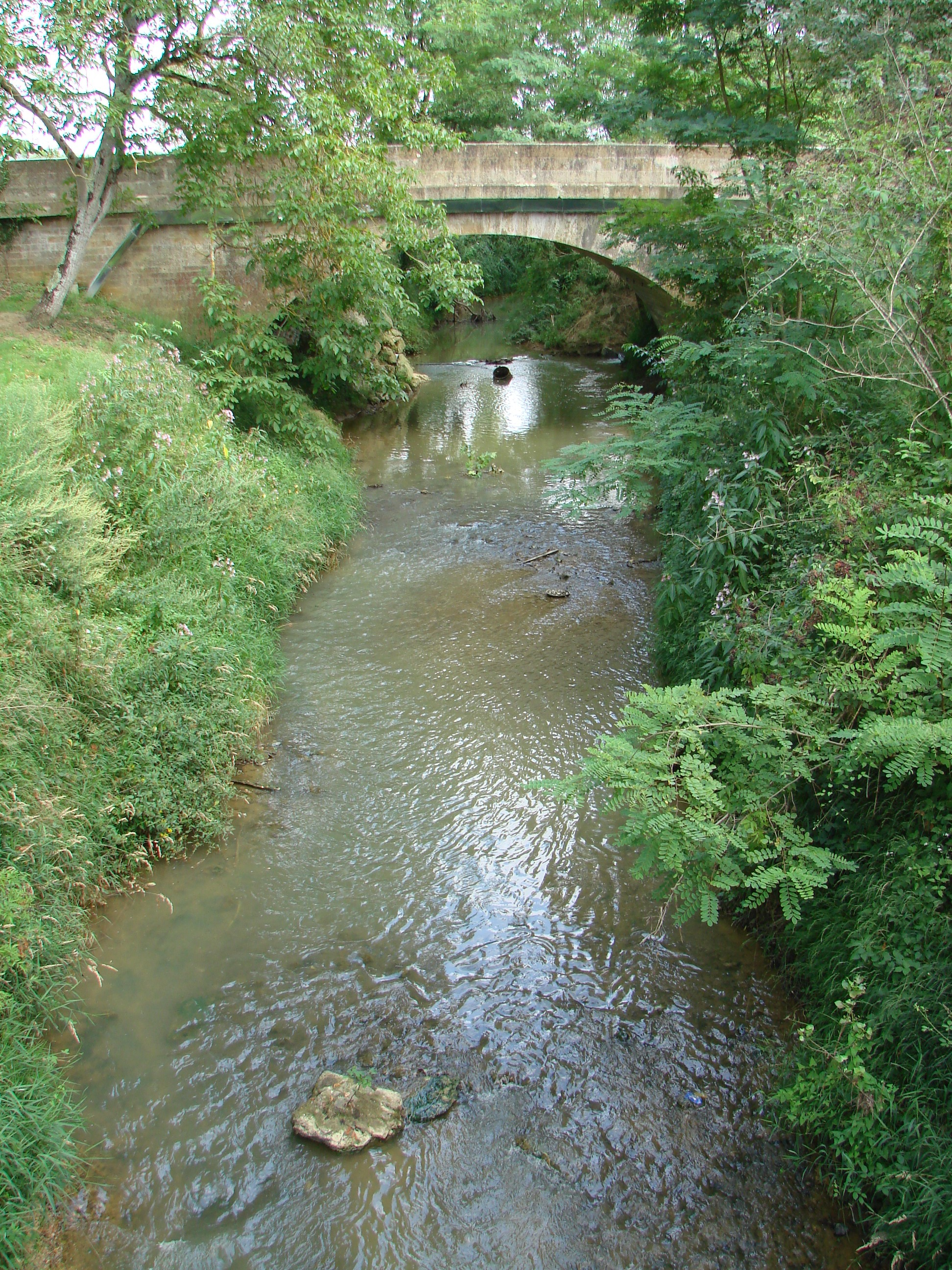

- Location within France Location within Occitanie

Location
- Country: France

Physical characteristics
- Source
  - location: Plateau de Lannemezan
- Mouth
  - location: Arros
  - coordinates: 43°33′53″N 0°5′50″E
- Length: 63 km (39 mi)

Basin features
- Progression: Arros→ Adour→ Atlantic Ocean

The Bouès (Occitan: Boés) is a right tributary of the Arros, at the eastern end of the basin of the Adour, in Occitania, southwestern France. It is 63 km (39 mi) long.

== Geography ==
The Bouès rises near Capvern, west of Lannemezan where it is fed by the Neste Canal. It flows north through a narrow valley and joins the Arros, downstream from Marciac, in a historical region known as Rivière-Basse.

== Départements and towns ==
- Hautes-Pyrénées : Capvern, Lutilhous, Bernadets-Dessus, Sère-Rustaing, Vidou.
- Gers : Miélan, Tillac (Gers), Marciac.

== Main tributaries ==
- (R) Cabournieu, from Monpardiac
- (L) Laüs or Lahus, from Laguian-Mazous
- (R) Lis or Lys
