= Cadeillan =

- Commune
- Location of Cadeillan
- Location within France Location within Occitanie
- Coordinates: 43°25′19″N 0°50′53″E
- Country: France
- Region: Occitania
- Department: Gers
- Arrondissement: Auch
- Canton: Val de Save
- Intercommunality: Savès

Government
  - Mayor (2020–2026): Denys Granier-Deferre
- Area^{1}: 4.26 km^{2} (1.64 sq mi)
- Elevation: 213 m (699 ft)
- Highest elevation: 247 m (810 ft)
- Lowest elevation: 177 m (581 ft)
- Population (2023): 85
  - Density: 20/km^{2} (52/sq mi)
- Time zone: UTC+01:00 (CET)
  - Summer (DST): UTC+02:00 (CEST)
- INSEE/Postal code: 32069 /32220
- ^{1} French Land Register data, which excludes lakes, ponds, glaciers > 1 km^{2} (0.386 sq mi or 247 acres) and river estuaries.

Cadeillan (French pronunciation: [kadɛjɑ̃]; Occitan: Cadelhan de Savés) is a commune in the Gers department in southwestern France.

== Geography ==
The river Gesse forms all of the commune's western and northwestern borders, then flows into the Save, which forms all of the commune's eastern and northeastern borders.

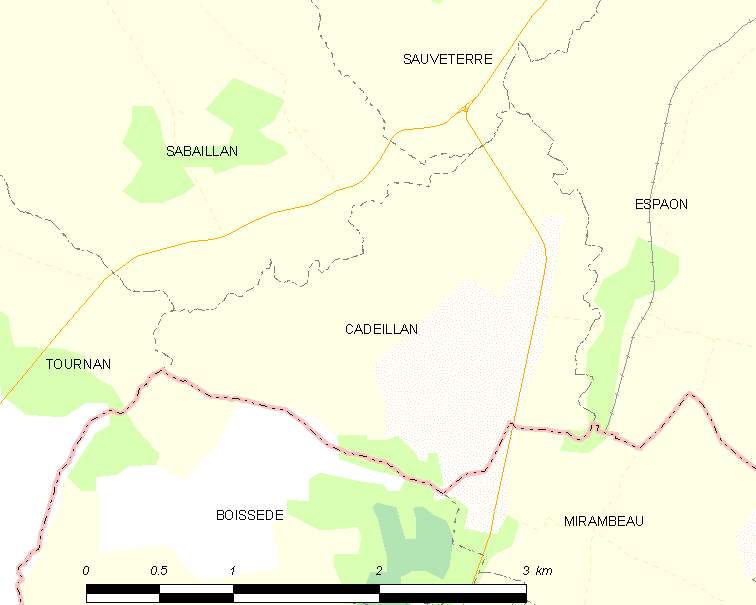
Cadeillan and its surrounding communes

== Population ==
Historical population
Year	Pop.	±% p.a.
1968	69	—
1975	46	−5.63%
1982	48	+0.61%
1990	48	+0.00%
1999	72	+4.61%
2007	74	+0.34%
2012	64	−2.86%
2017	61	−0.96%
2023	85	+5.69%
Source: INSEE

== Notable people ==
- Bill Coleman, American jazz trumpeter, lived in Cadeillan from 1975.

== See also ==
- Communes of the Gers department
