= Gesse =

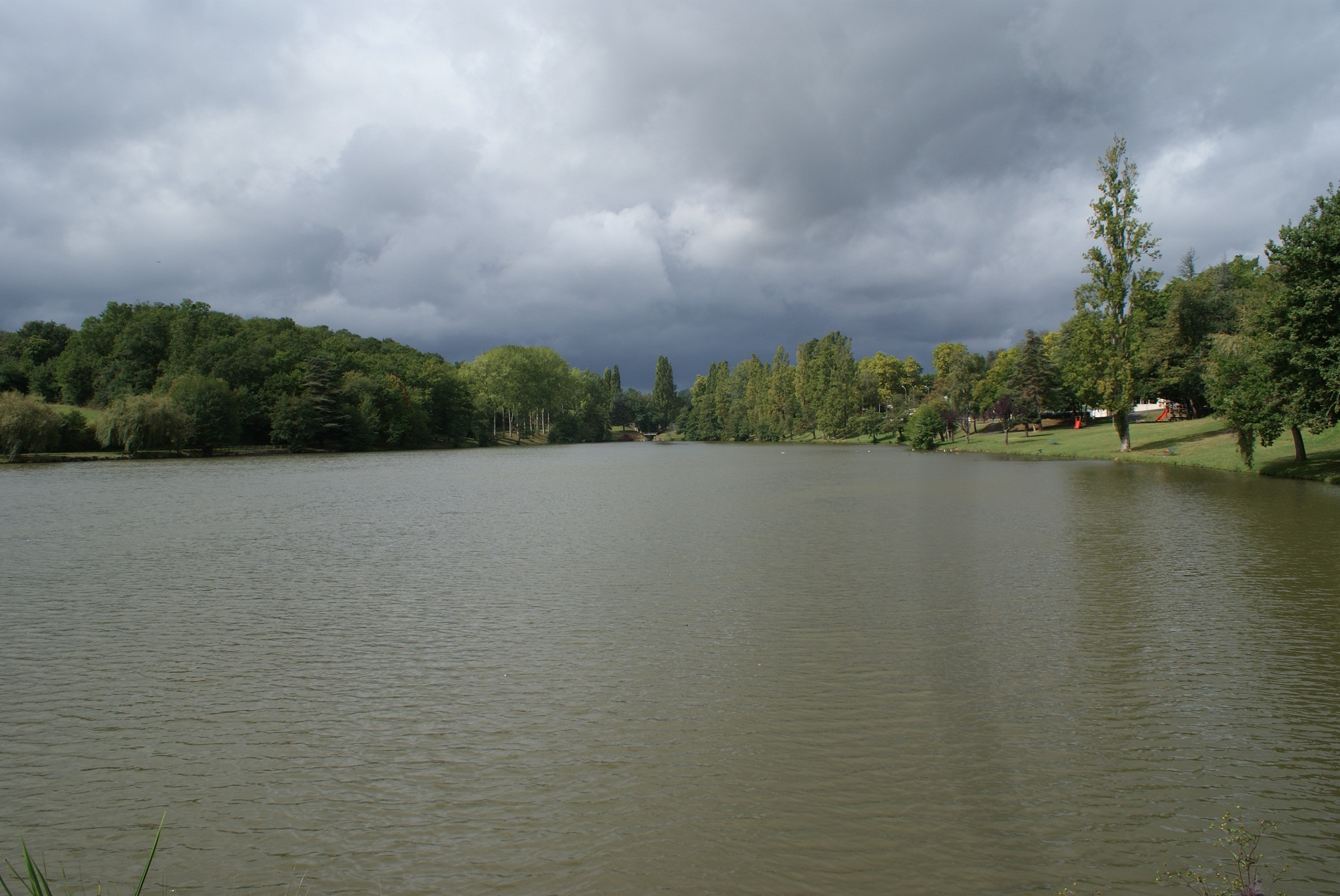

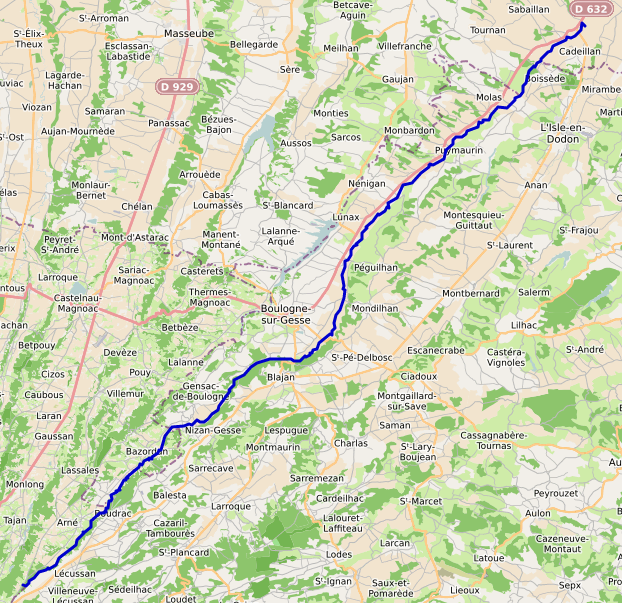

Location
- Country: France

Physical characteristics
- Source
  - location: Arné
  - coordinates: 43°09′17″N 00°28′00″E
  - elevation: 550 m (1,800 ft)
- Mouth: Save
  - coordinates: 43°26′04″N 00°51′06″E
  - elevation: 175 m (574 ft)
- Length: 52.1 km (32.4 mi)

Basin features
- Progression: Save→ Garonne→ Gironde estuary→ Atlantic Ocean

The Gesse (French pronunciation: [ʒɛs]; Gascon: Gessa) is a 52.1 km (32.4 mi) long river in the Hautes-Pyrénées, Haute-Garonne and Gers départements, southwestern France. Its source is at Arné, on the plateau de Lannemezan. It flows generally northeast. It is a left tributary of the Save into which it flows at Espaon.

== Départements and communes along its course ==
This list is ordered from source to mouth:

- Hautes-Pyrénées: Arné
- Haute-Garonne: Boudrac
- Hautes-Pyrénées: Bazordan
- Haute-Garonne: Saint-Loup-en-Comminges, Nizan-Gesse, Gensac-de-Boulogne, Blajan, Boulogne-sur-Gesse, Péguilhan, Lunax, Nénigan, Saint-Ferréol-de-Comminges, Puymaurin, Molas
- Gers: Tournan
- Haute-Garonne: Boissède
- Gers: Cadeillan, Sabaillan, Sauveterre, Espaon,
