= L'Isle-en-Dodon =

L'Isle-en-Dodon L'Isla de Haut (Occitan)
- Commune
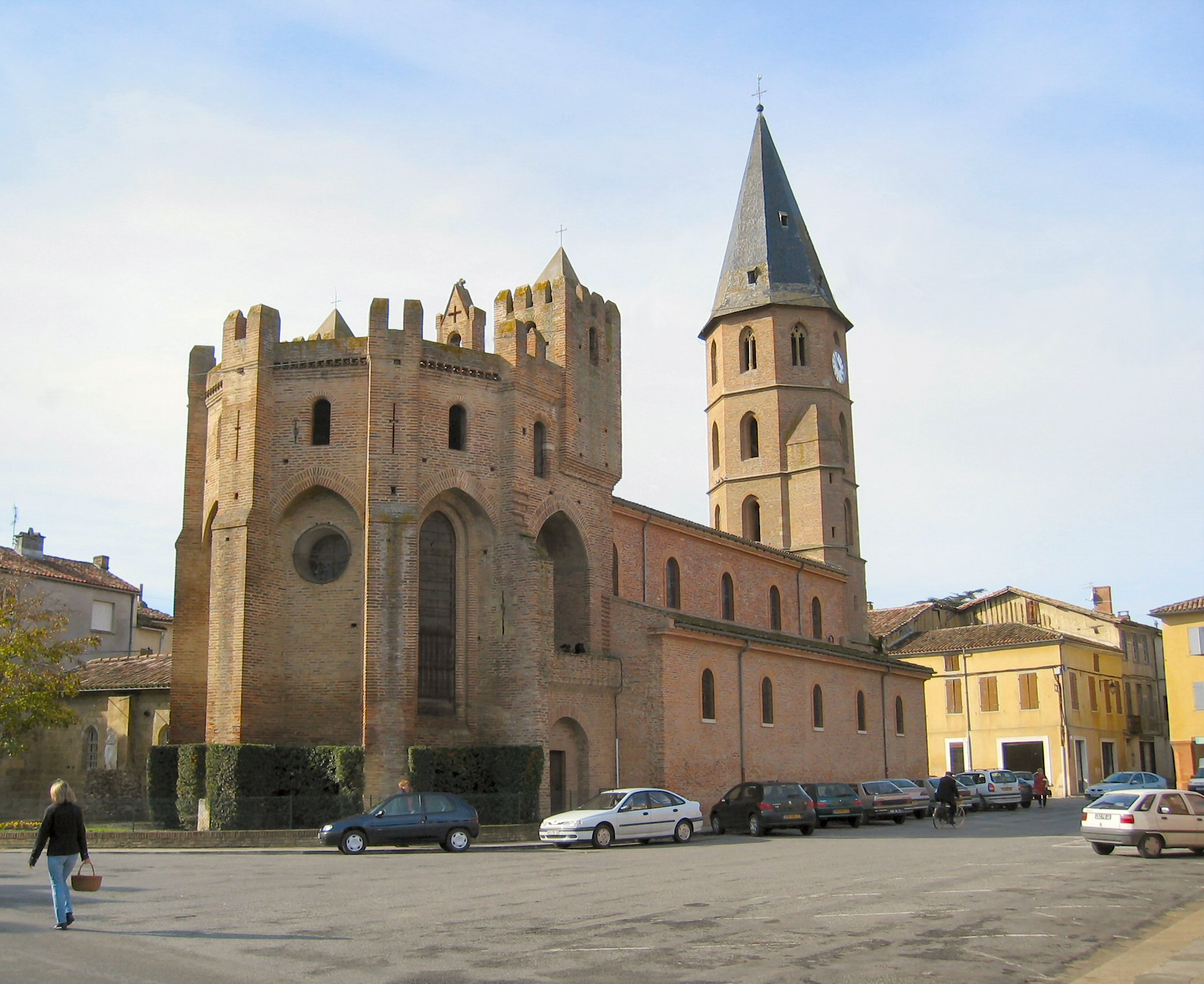
- The church in L'Isle-en-Dodon

- Coat of arms
- Location of L'Isle-en-Dodon
- Location within France Location within Occitanie
- Coordinates: 43°22′56″N 0°50′10″E
- Country: France
- Region: Occitania
- Department: Haute-Garonne
- Arrondissement: Saint-Gaudens
- Canton: Cazères

Government
  - Mayor (2020–2026): Lionel Welter
- Area^{1}: 22.58 km^{2} (8.72 sq mi)
- Elevation: 200 m (660 ft)
- Highest elevation: 326 m (1,070 ft)
- Lowest elevation: 187 m (614 ft)
- Population (2023): 1,614
  - Density: 71.48/km^{2} (185.1/sq mi)
- Time zone: UTC+01:00 (CET)
  - Summer (DST): UTC+02:00 (CEST)
- INSEE/Postal code: 31239 /31230
- ^{1} French Land Register data, which excludes lakes, ponds, glaciers > 1 km^{2} (0.386 sq mi or 247 acres) and river estuaries.

L'Isle-en-Dodon (French pronunciation: [l il ɑ̃ dɔdɔ̃]; Occitan: L'Isla de Haut) is a commune in the Haute-Garonne department in southwestern France. The commune has the short border with the neighbouring department, Gers.

The rugby team is the focal point of the community. Based in the municipal stadium it regularly attracts 1000 spectators and regularly qualifies for the last 32 and beyond in the Federale 3 playoffs

== Geography ==
L'Isle-en-Dodon is located on the Save river, at the northern end of the plate of Lannemezan. The slopes which surround the city point out the nearby gersois country.

== Population ==
Historical population
Year	Pop.	±% p.a.
1968	2,046	—
1975	2,022	−0.17%
1982	2,039	+0.12%
1990	2,037	−0.01%
1999	1,905	−0.74%
2007	2,137	+1.45%
2012	1,961	−1.70%
2017	1,631	−3.62%
2023	1,614	−0.17%
Source: INSEE

The inhabitants of the commune are called lislois in French.

== Transportation ==
L'Isle-en-Dodon is 60 kilometres from Toulouse by road, a journey which takes approximately one hour. A regular bus service runs three times a day to Toulouse. At Saint-Gaudens, 45 km (28 mi) to the south in the valley of the Garonne, the A64 autoroute and the SNCF train line pass.

== See also ==
Communes of the Haute-Garonne department
