= Saint-Loup-en-Comminges =

- Commune
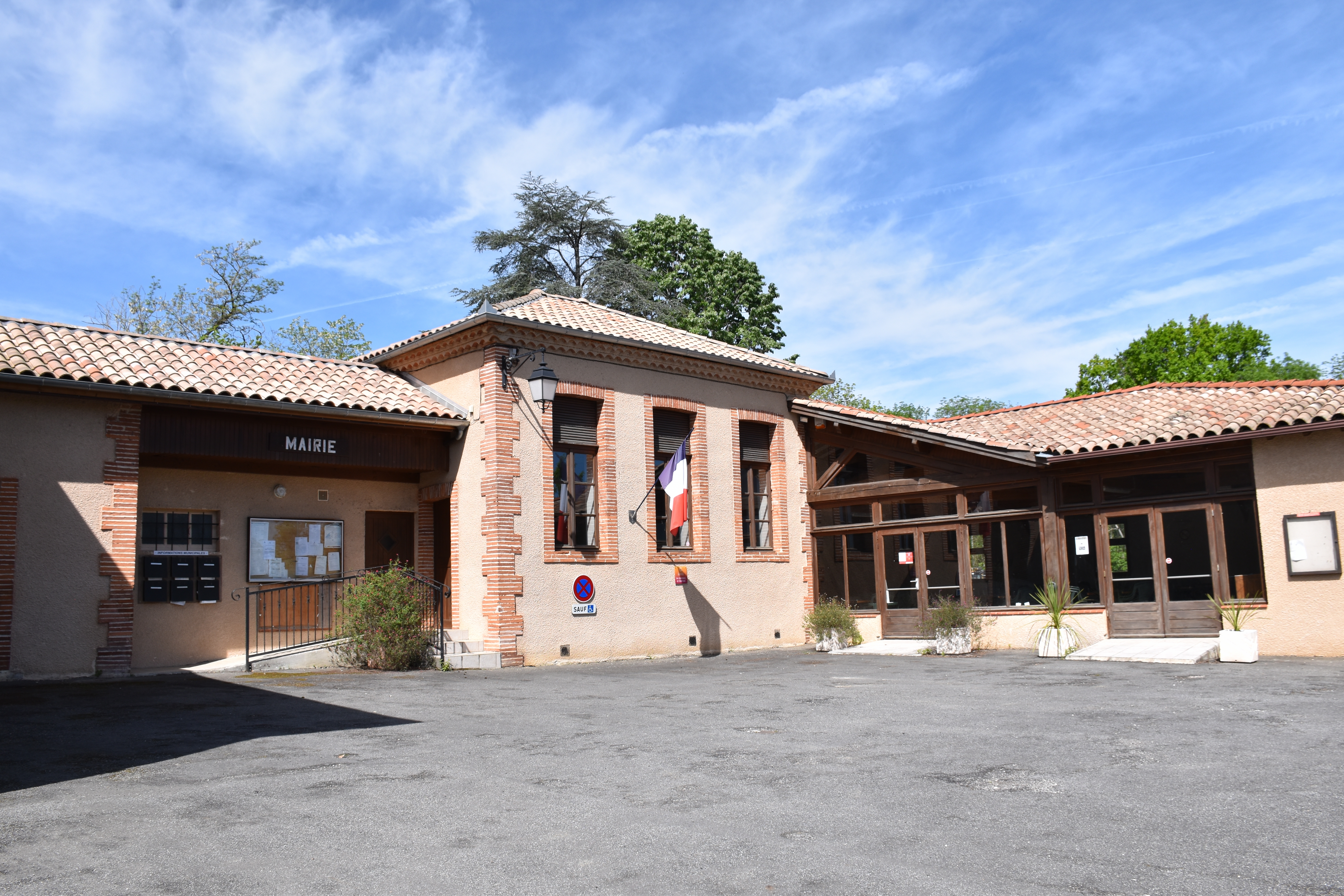
- Saint-Loup-en-Comminges Town hall
- Location of Saint-Loup-en-Comminges
- Location within France Location within Occitanie
- Coordinates: 43°14′45″N 0°35′02″E
- Country: France
- Region: Occitania
- Department: Haute-Garonne
- Arrondissement: Saint-Gaudens
- Canton: Saint-Gaudens

Government
  - Mayor (2020–2026): Denis Bouzigues
- Area^{1}: 4.73 km^{2} (1.83 sq mi)
- Elevation: 420 m (1,380 ft)
- Highest elevation: 466 m (1,529 ft)
- Lowest elevation: 325 m (1,066 ft)
- Population (2023): 38
  - Density: 8.0/km^{2} (21/sq mi)
- Time zone: UTC+01:00 (CET)
  - Summer (DST): UTC+02:00 (CEST)
- INSEE/Postal code: 31498 /31350
- ^{1} French Land Register data, which excludes lakes, ponds, glaciers > 1 km^{2} (0.386 sq mi or 247 acres) and river estuaries.

Saint-Loup-en-Comminges (French pronunciation: [sɛ̃ lu ɑ̃ kɔmɛ̃ʒ], literally Saint-Loup in Comminges; Occitan: Sent Lop de Comenge) is a commune in the Haute-Garonne department in southwestern France.

== Geography ==
The river Gesse flows east-northeast through the southeastern part of the commune and forms part of its eastern border.

== Population ==
Historical population
Year	Pop.	±% p.a.
1968	84	—
1975	46	−8.24%
1982	46	+0.00%
1990	36	−3.02%
1999	40	+1.18%
2007	39	−0.32%
2012	35	−2.14%
2017	36	+0.57%
2023	38	+0.91%
Source: INSEE

== See also ==
- Communes of the Haute-Garonne department
