= Arné =

- Commune
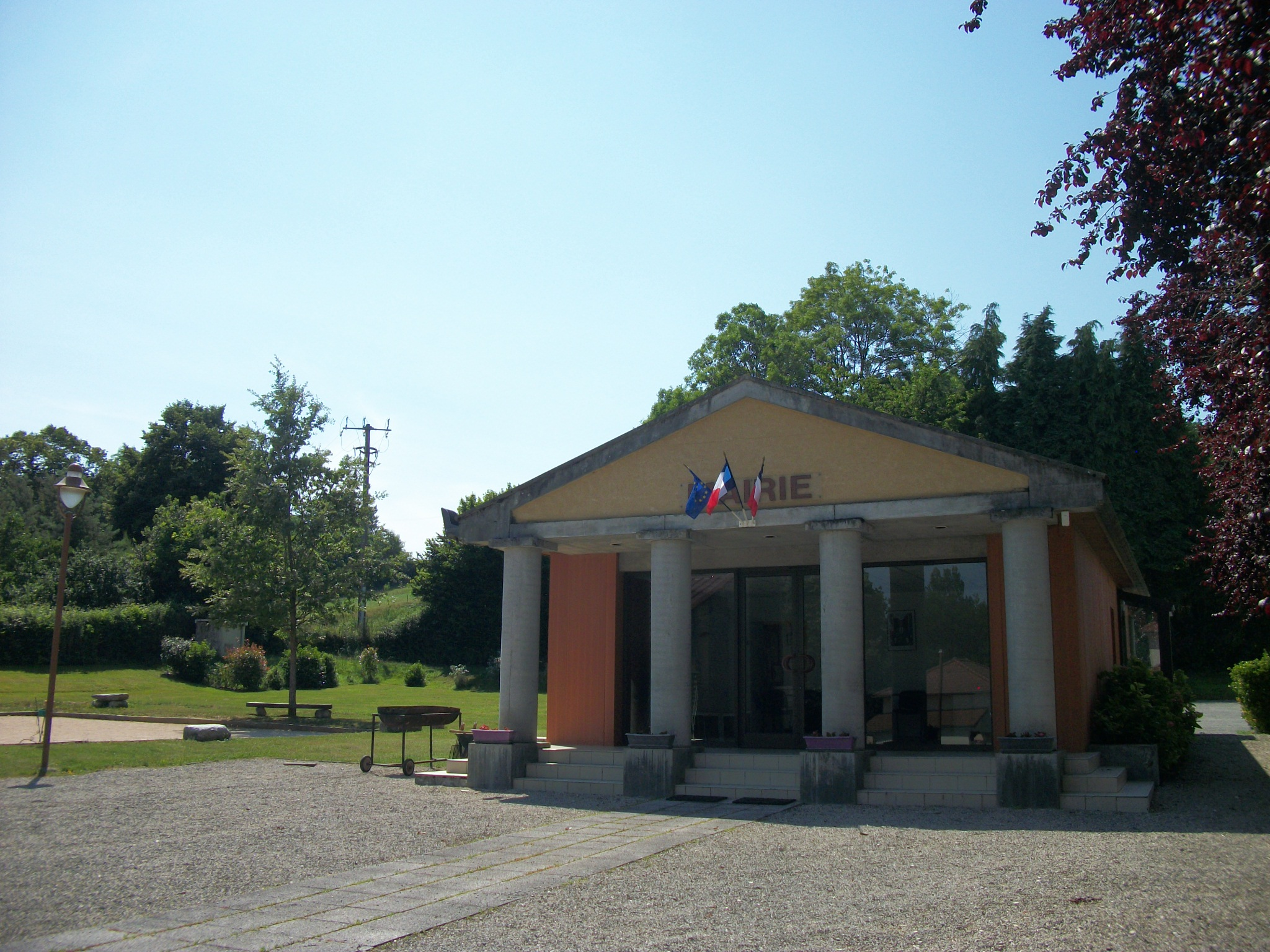
- Town hall

- Coat of arms
- Location of Arné
- Location within France Location within Occitanie
- Coordinates: 43°11′11″N 0°30′22″E
- Country: France
- Region: Occitania
- Department: Hautes-Pyrénées
- Arrondissement: Bagnères-de-Bigorre
- Canton: La Vallée de la Barousse
- Intercommunality: CC Plateau de Lannemezan

Government
  - Mayor (2020–2026): Lionel Cazaux
- Area^{1}: 8.34 km^{2} (3.22 sq mi)
- Elevation: 420 m (1,380 ft)
- Highest elevation: 564 m (1,850 ft)
- Lowest elevation: 414 m (1,358 ft)
- Population (2023): 181
  - Density: 21.7/km^{2} (56.2/sq mi)
- Time zone: UTC+01:00 (CET)
  - Summer (DST): UTC+02:00 (CEST)
- INSEE/Postal code: 65028 /65670
- ^{1} French Land Register data, which excludes lakes, ponds, glaciers > 1 km^{2} (0.386 sq mi or 247 acres) and river estuaries.

Arné (French pronunciation: [aʁne]; Occitan: Arnèr) is a commune in the Hautes-Pyrénées department in southwestern France.

== Geography ==
The river Gesse has its source in the southern part of the commune and forms most of its eastern border.

== Population ==
Historical population
Year	Pop.	±% p.a.
1968	257	—
1975	234	−1.33%
1982	199	−2.29%
1990	188	−0.71%
1999	187	−0.06%
2007	191	+0.26%
2012	218	+2.68%
2017	213	−0.46%
2023	181	−2.68%
Source: INSEE

== See also ==
- Communes of the Hautes-Pyrénées department
