= Boissède =

- Commune
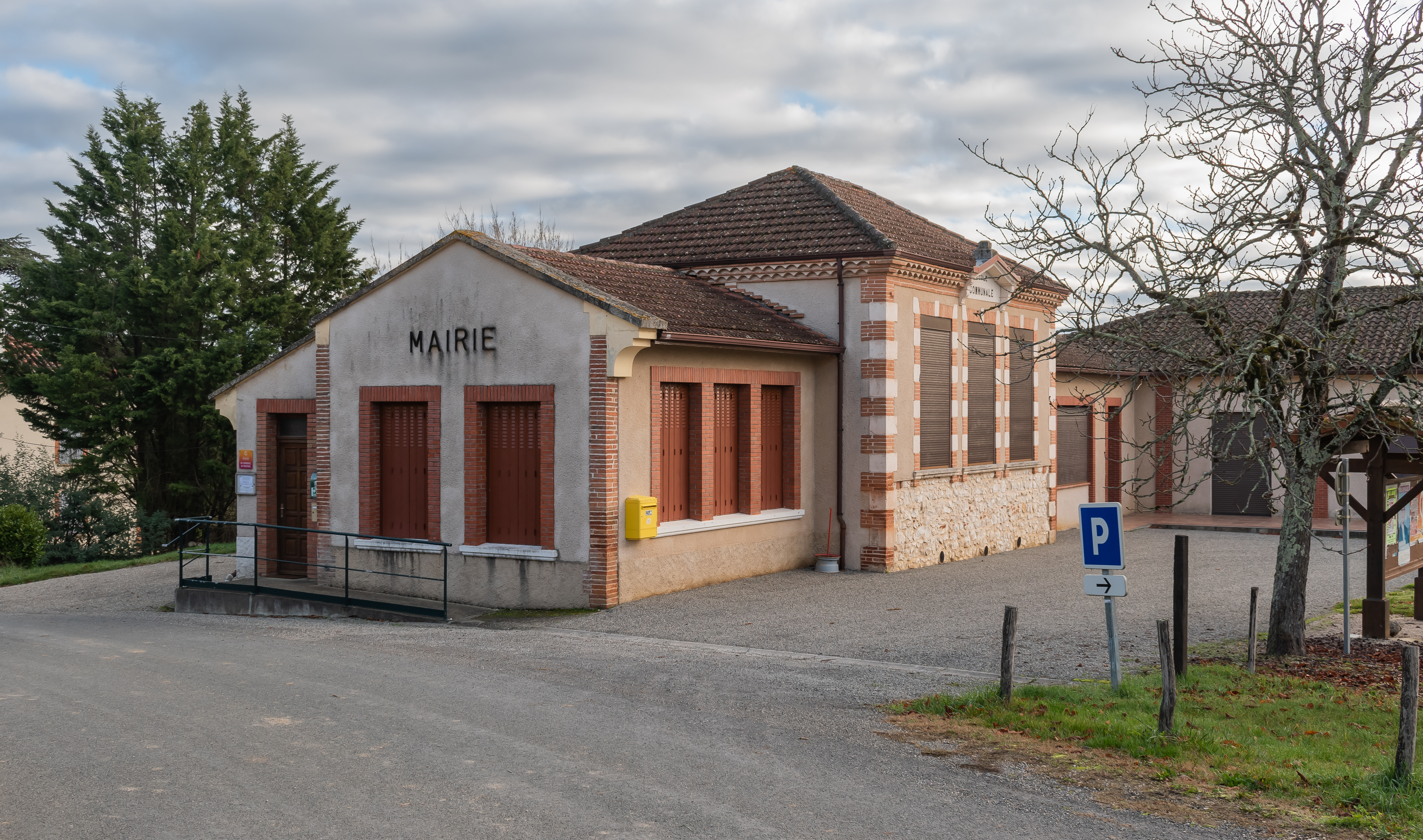
- Location of Boissède
- Location within France Location within Occitanie
- Coordinates: 43°24′29″N 0°49′31″E
- Country: France
- Region: Occitania
- Department: Haute-Garonne
- Arrondissement: Saint-Gaudens
- Canton: Cazères

Government
  - Mayor (2020–2026): Alain Frechou
- Area^{1}: 3.84 km^{2} (1.48 sq mi)
- Elevation: 230 m (750 ft)
- Highest elevation: 252 m (827 ft)
- Lowest elevation: 186 m (610 ft)
- Population (2023): 65
  - Density: 17/km^{2} (44/sq mi)
- Time zone: UTC+01:00 (CET)
  - Summer (DST): UTC+02:00 (CEST)
- INSEE/Postal code: 31072 /31230
- ^{1} French Land Register data, which excludes lakes, ponds, glaciers > 1 km^{2} (0.386 sq mi or 247 acres) and river estuaries.

Boissède (French pronunciation: [bwasɛd]; Occitan: Boisheda) is a commune in the Haute-Garonne department in southwestern France.

== Geography ==
The river Gesse forms all of the commune's western border.

== Population ==
Historical population
Year	Pop.	±% p.a.
1968	93	—
1975	57	−6.75%
1982	65	+1.89%
1990	59	−1.20%
1999	71	+2.08%
2007	83	+1.97%
2012	80	−0.73%
2017	70	−2.64%
2023	65	−1.23%
Source: INSEE

== See also ==
- Communes of the Haute-Garonne department
