= Molas, Haute-Garonne =

Molas
- Commune
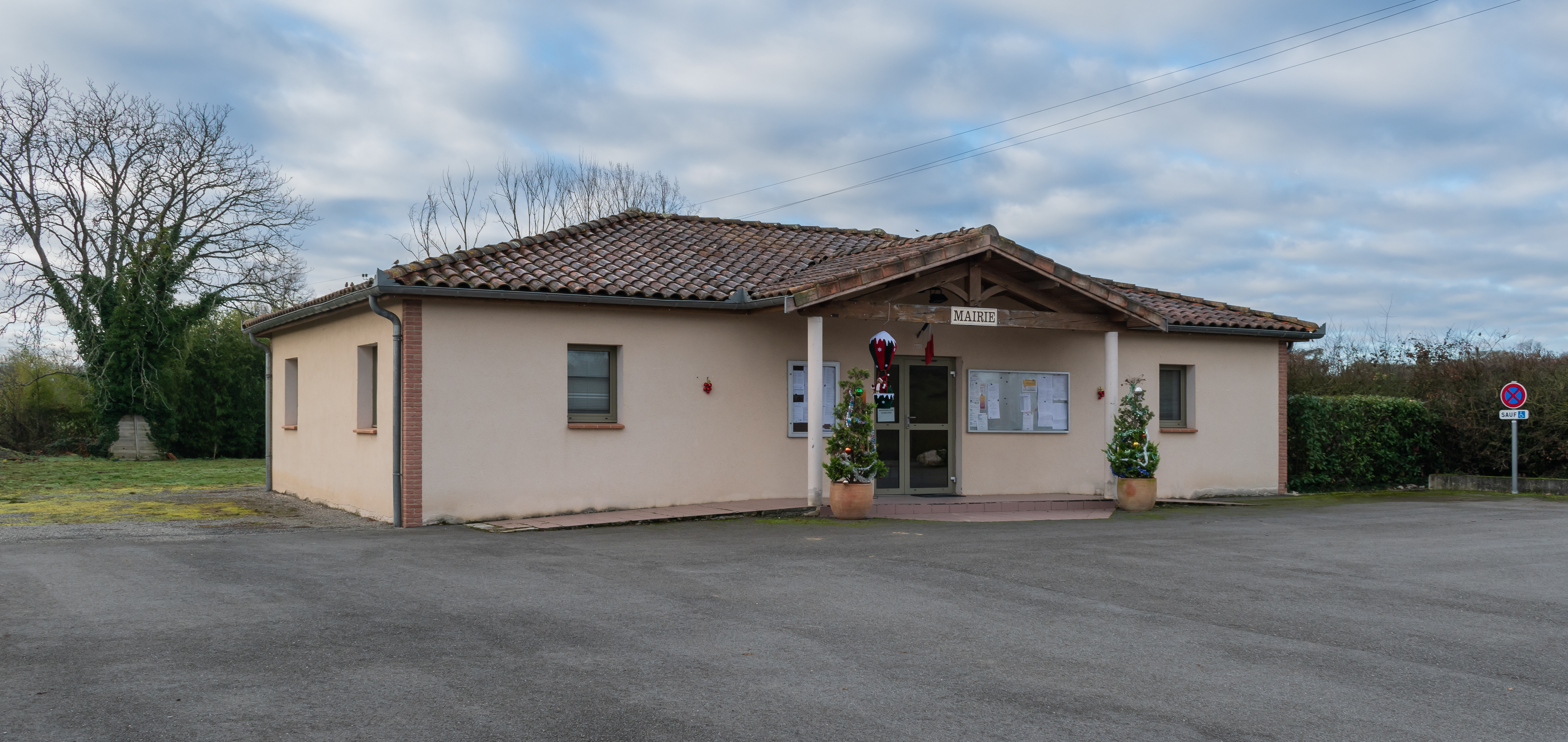

- Coat of arms
- Location of Molas
- Location within France Location within Occitanie
- Coordinates: 43°24′02″N 0°46′50″E
- Country: France
- Region: Occitania
- Department: Haute-Garonne
- Arrondissement: Saint-Gaudens
- Canton: Cazères
- Intercommunality: Cœur et Coteaux du Comminges

Government
  - Mayor (2020–2026): Joëlle Medous
- Area^{1}: 10.43 km^{2} (4.03 sq mi)
- Elevation: 198 m (650 ft)
- Highest elevation: 301 m (988 ft)
- Lowest elevation: 192 m (630 ft)
- Population (2023): 167
  - Density: 16.0/km^{2} (41.5/sq mi)
- Time zone: UTC+01:00 (CET)
  - Summer (DST): UTC+02:00 (CEST)
- INSEE/Postal code: 31347 /31230
- ^{1} French Land Register data, which excludes lakes, ponds, glaciers > 1 km^{2} (0.386 sq mi or 247 acres) and river estuaries.

Molas is a commune in the Haute-Garonne department in southwestern France.

== Geography ==
The river Gesse flows northeast through the eastern part of the commune.

== Population ==
Historical population
Year	Pop.	±% p.a.
1968	162	—
1975	136	−2.47%
1982	134	−0.21%
1990	121	−1.27%
1999	146	+2.11%
2007	170	+1.92%
2012	159	−1.33%
2017	167	+0.99%
2023	167	+0.00%
Source: INSEE

== See also ==
- Communes of the Haute-Garonne department
