= Tournan, Gers =

Tournan
- Commune
- Location of Tournan
- Location within France Location within Occitanie
- Coordinates: 43°25′58″N 0°47′06″E
- Country: France
- Region: Occitania
- Department: Gers
- Arrondissement: Auch
- Canton: Val de Save
- Intercommunality: Savès

Government
  - Mayor (2020–2026): Jean-Luc Mimouni
- Area^{1}: 12.56 km^{2} (4.85 sq mi)
- Elevation: 273 m (896 ft)
- Highest elevation: 305 m (1,001 ft)
- Lowest elevation: 184 m (604 ft)
- Population (2023): 175
  - Density: 13.9/km^{2} (36.1/sq mi)
- Time zone: UTC+01:00 (CET)
  - Summer (DST): UTC+02:00 (CEST)
- INSEE/Postal code: 32451 /32420
- ^{1} French Land Register data, which excludes lakes, ponds, glaciers > 1 km^{2} (0.386 sq mi or 247 acres) and river estuaries.

Tournan (French pronunciation: [tuʁnɑ̃]; Occitan: Tornan) is a commune in the Gers department in southwestern France.

== Geography ==
=== Localisation ===
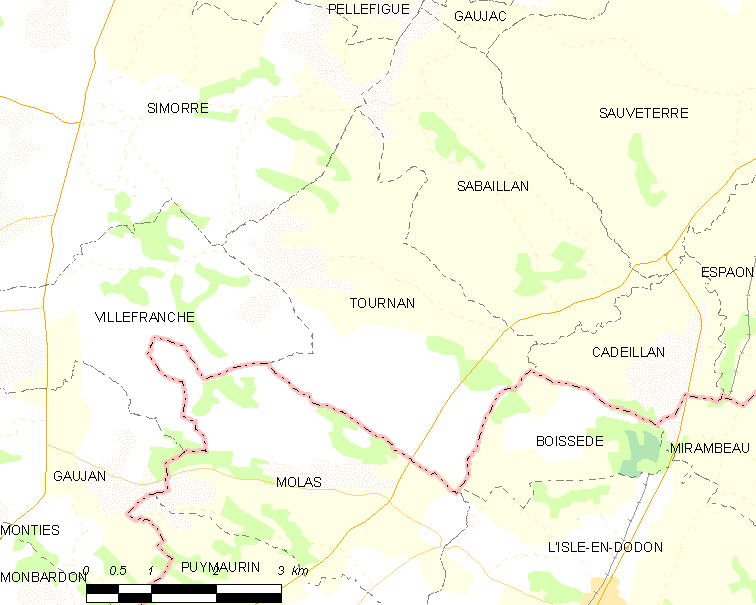
Tournan and its surrounding communes

=== Hydrography ===
The river Gesse forms most of the commune's southeastern border.

== Population ==
Historical population
Year	Pop.	±% p.a.
1968	201	—
1975	193	−0.58%
1982	180	−0.99%
1990	182	+0.14%
1999	178	−0.25%
2007	199	+1.40%
2012	201	+0.20%
2017	182	−1.97%
2023	175	−0.65%
Source: INSEE

== See also ==
- Communes of the Gers department
