= Saint-Ferréol-de-Comminges =

- Commune
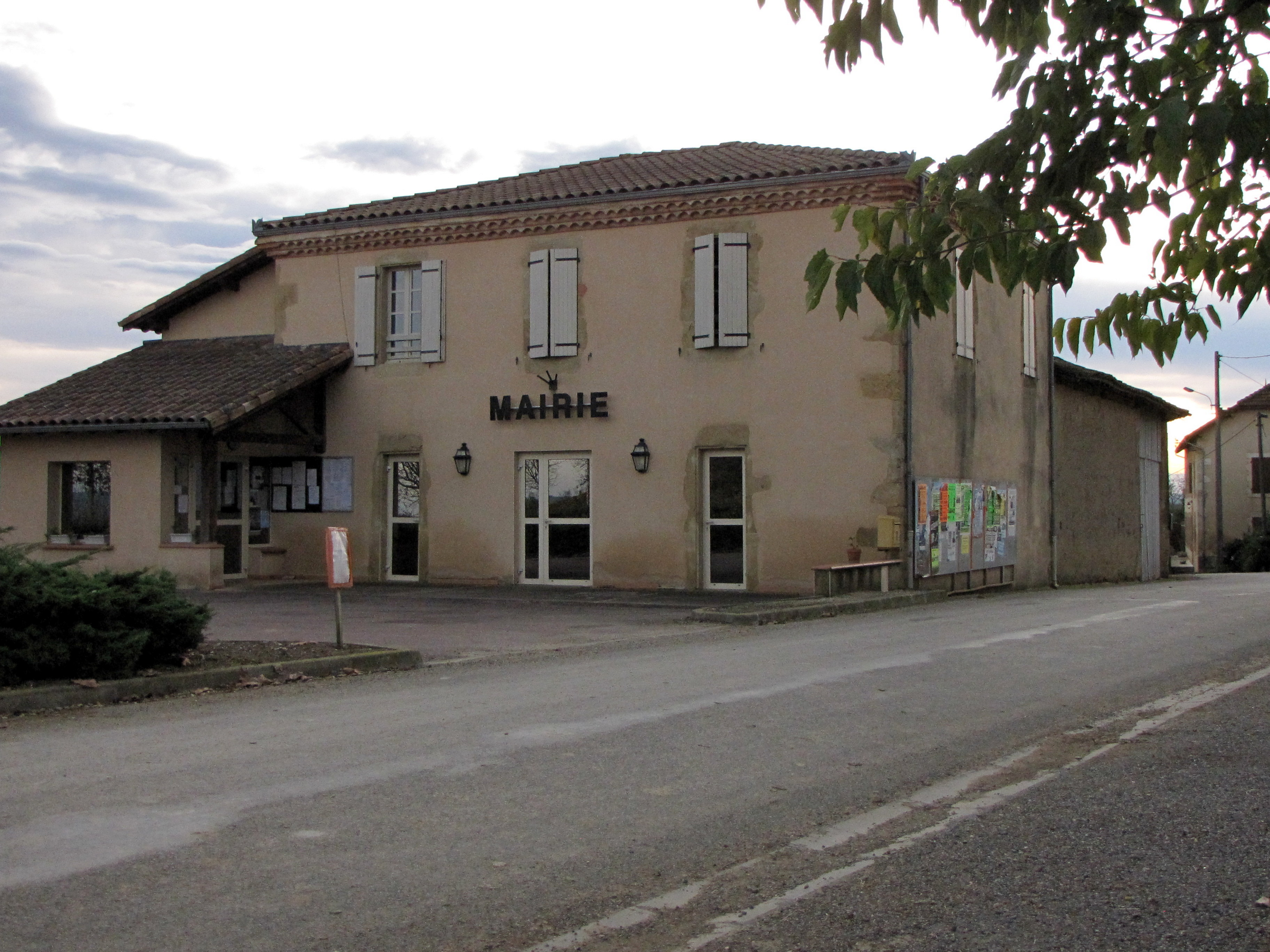
- Town hall
- Location of Saint-Ferréol-de-Comminges
- Location within France Location within Occitanie
- Coordinates: 43°20′18″N 0°44′25″E
- Country: France
- Region: Occitania
- Department: Haute-Garonne
- Arrondissement: Saint-Gaudens
- Canton: Saint-Gaudens

Government
  - Mayor (2020–2026): Thierry Bouas
- Area^{1}: 5.88 km^{2} (2.27 sq mi)
- Elevation: 311 m (1,020 ft)
- Highest elevation: 335 m (1,099 ft)
- Lowest elevation: 213 m (699 ft)
- Population (2023): 59
  - Density: 10/km^{2} (26/sq mi)
- Time zone: UTC+01:00 (CET)
  - Summer (DST): UTC+02:00 (CEST)
- INSEE/Postal code: 31479 /31250
- ^{1} French Land Register data, which excludes lakes, ponds, glaciers > 1 km^{2} (0.386 sq mi or 247 acres) and river estuaries.

Saint-Ferréol-de-Comminges (Occitan: Sant Ferriòu, before 2003: Saint-Ferréol) is a commune in the Haute-Garonne department in southwestern France.

== Geography ==
The river Gesse forms part of the commune's northwestern border.

== Population ==
Historical population
Year	Pop.	±% p.a.
1968	85	—
1975	71	−2.54%
1982	67	−0.82%
1990	63	−0.77%
1999	53	−1.90%
2007	56	+0.69%
2012	45	−4.28%
2017	58	+5.21%
2023	59	+0.29%
Source: INSEE

== See also ==
- Communes of the Haute-Garonne department
