= Boudrac =

- Commune
- Location of Boudrac
- Location within France Location within Occitanie
- Coordinates: 43°11′31″N 0°31′39″E
- Country: France
- Region: Occitania
- Department: Haute-Garonne
- Arrondissement: Saint-Gaudens
- Canton: Saint-Gaudens

Government
  - Mayor (2020–2026): Gilles Clarens
- Area^{1}: 11.64 km^{2} (4.49 sq mi)
- Elevation: 498 m (1,634 ft)
- Highest elevation: 564 m (1,850 ft)
- Lowest elevation: 379 m (1,243 ft)
- Population (2023): 148
  - Density: 12.7/km^{2} (32.9/sq mi)
- Time zone: UTC+01:00 (CET)
  - Summer (DST): UTC+02:00 (CEST)
- INSEE/Postal code: 31078 /31580
- ^{1} French Land Register data, which excludes lakes, ponds, glaciers > 1 km^{2} (0.386 sq mi or 247 acres) and river estuaries.

Boudrac (French pronunciation: [budʁak]; Occitan: Bodrac) is a commune in the Haute-Garonne department in southwestern France.

== Geography ==
The river Gesse forms most of the commune's western border.

== Population ==
Historical population
Year	Pop.	±% p.a.
1968	148	—
1975	150	+0.19%
1982	144	−0.58%
1990	126	−1.66%
1999	122	−0.36%
2007	114	−0.84%
2012	132	+2.98%
2017	144	+1.76%
2023	148	+0.46%
Source: INSEE

== See also ==
- Communes of the Haute-Garonne department
