= Boulogne-sur-Gesse =

- Commune
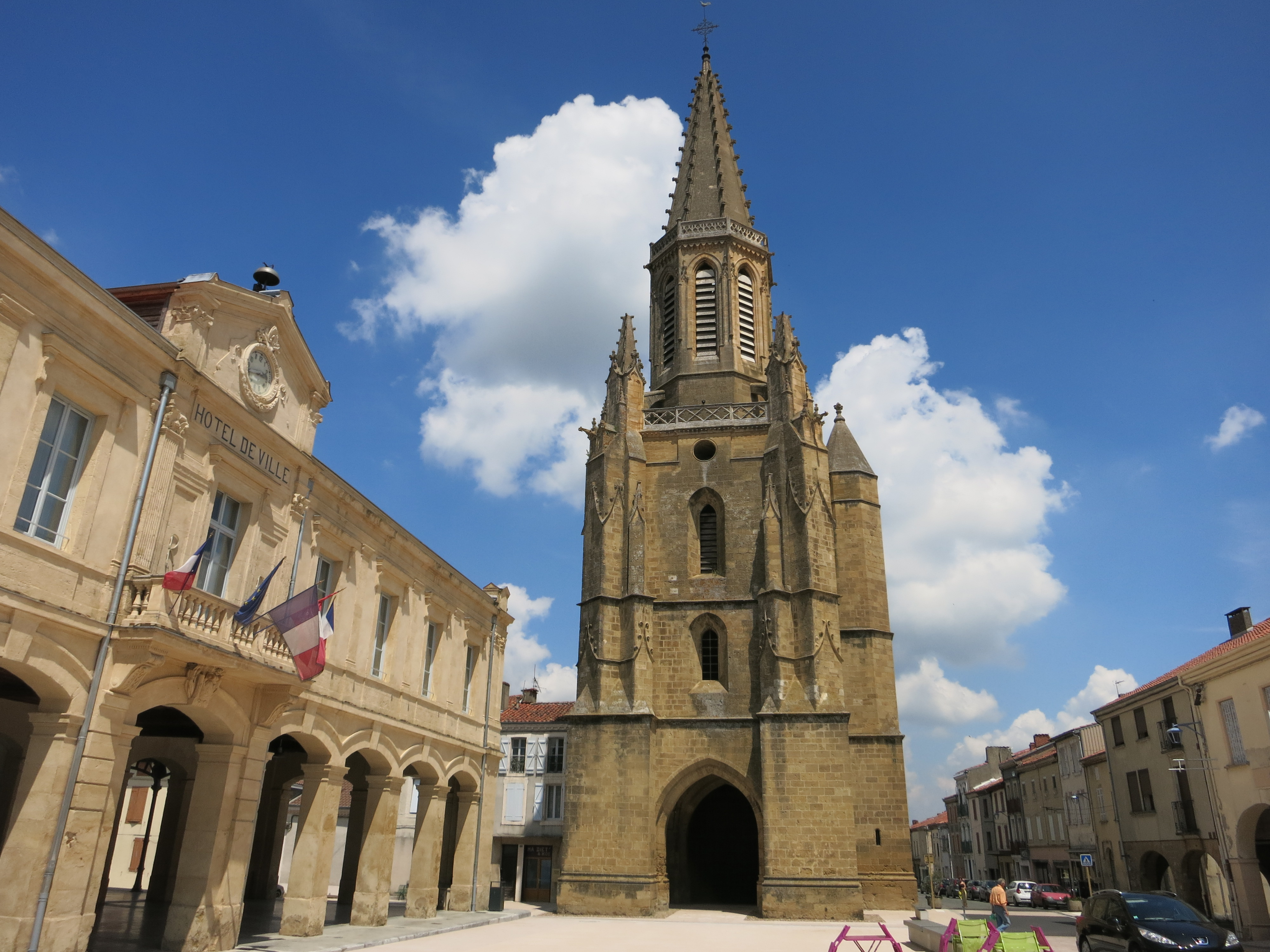
- The church and town hall in Boulogne-sur-Gesse

- Coat of arms
- Location of Boulogne-sur-Gesse
- Location within France Location within Occitanie
- Coordinates: 43°17′26″N 0°38′44″E
- Country: France
- Region: Occitania
- Department: Haute-Garonne
- Arrondissement: Saint-Gaudens
- Canton: Saint-Gaudens

Government
  - Mayor (2020–2026): Alain Boubée
- Area^{1}: 24.73 km^{2} (9.55 sq mi)
- Elevation: 335 m (1,099 ft)
- Highest elevation: 388 m (1,273 ft)
- Lowest elevation: 243 m (797 ft)
- Population (2023): 1,673
  - Density: 67.65/km^{2} (175.2/sq mi)
- Time zone: UTC+01:00 (CET)
  - Summer (DST): UTC+02:00 (CEST)
- INSEE/Postal code: 31080 /31350
- ^{1} French Land Register data, which excludes lakes, ponds, glaciers > 1 km^{2} (0.386 sq mi or 247 acres) and river estuaries.

Boulogne-sur-Gesse (French pronunciation: [bulɔɲ syʁ ʒɛs], literally Boulogne on Gesse; Gascon: Bolonha de Gessa) is a commune of the Haute-Garonne department in southwestern France.

== Geography ==
The river Gesse forms most of the commune's eastern border, while the Gimone forms part of its southwestern and northwestern borders.

== Population ==
Historical population
Year	Pop.	±% p.a.
1968	1,865	—
1975	1,756	−0.86%
1982	1,671	−0.71%
1990	1,531	−1.09%
1999	1,433	−0.73%
2007	1,647	+1.76%
2012	1,607	−0.49%
2017	1,612	+0.06%
2023	1,673	+0.62%
Source: INSEE

== See also ==
- Communes of the Haute-Garonne department
