= Blajan =

- Commune
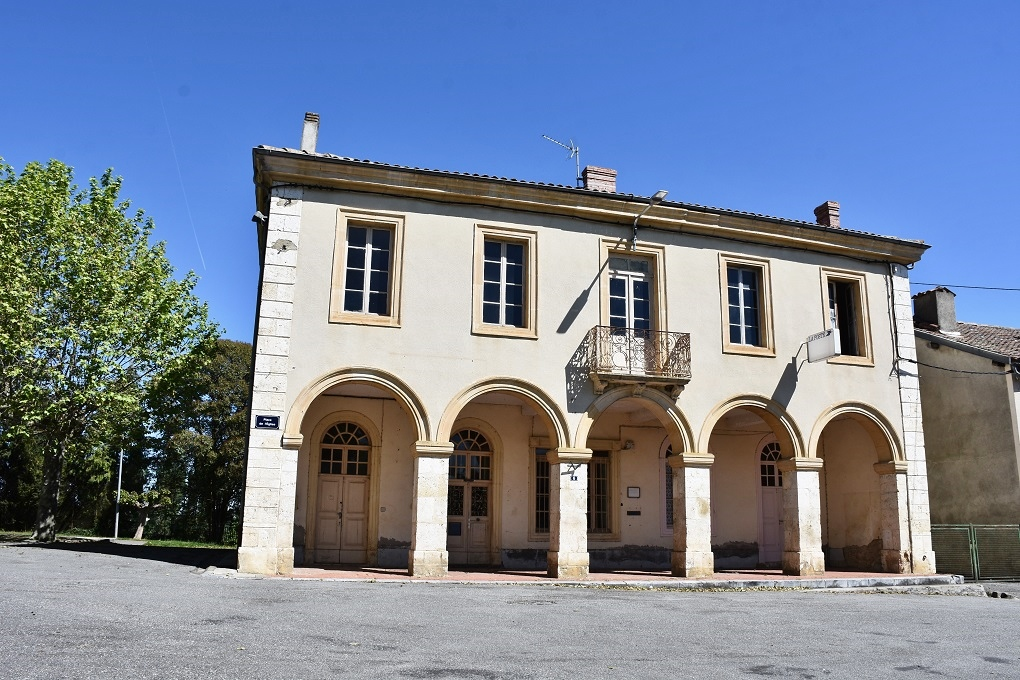
- Blajan Town Hall

- Coat of arms
- Location of Blajan
- Location within France Location within Occitanie
- Coordinates: 43°15′40″N 0°38′41″E
- Country: France
- Region: Occitania
- Department: Haute-Garonne
- Arrondissement: Saint-Gaudens
- Canton: Saint-Gaudens

Government
  - Mayor (2020–2026): Jean-Bernard Castex
- Area^{1}: 12.68 km^{2} (4.90 sq mi)
- Elevation: 360 m (1,180 ft)
- Highest elevation: 430 m (1,410 ft)
- Lowest elevation: 277 m (909 ft)
- Population (2023): 426
  - Density: 33.6/km^{2} (87.0/sq mi)
- Time zone: UTC+01:00 (CET)
  - Summer (DST): UTC+02:00 (CEST)
- INSEE/Postal code: 31070 /31350
- ^{1} French Land Register data, which excludes lakes, ponds, glaciers > 1 km^{2} (0.386 sq mi or 247 acres) and river estuaries.

Blajan (French pronunciation: [blaʒɑ̃]) is a commune in the Haute-Garonne department in southwestern France.

== Geography ==
The river Gesse forms most of the commune's northwestern border.

== Population ==
Historical population
Year	Pop.	±% p.a.
1968	569	—
1975	595	+0.64%
1982	578	−0.41%
1990	521	−1.29%
1999	437	−1.93%
2007	521	+2.22%
2012	498	−0.90%
2017	504	+0.24%
2023	426	−2.76%
Source: INSEE

== See also ==
- Communes of the Haute-Garonne department
