= Sabaillan =

- Commune
- Location of Sabaillan
- Location within France Location within Occitanie
- Coordinates: 43°26′34″N 0°48′47″E
- Country: France
- Region: Occitania
- Department: Gers
- Arrondissement: Auch
- Canton: Val de Save
- Intercommunality: Savès

Government
  - Mayor (2020–2026): Sandie Magnoac
- Area^{1}: 11.21 km^{2} (4.33 sq mi)
- Elevation: 250 m (820 ft)
- Highest elevation: 307 m (1,007 ft)
- Lowest elevation: 179 m (587 ft)
- Population (2023): 153
  - Density: 13.6/km^{2} (35.3/sq mi)
- Time zone: UTC+01:00 (CET)
  - Summer (DST): UTC+02:00 (CEST)
- INSEE/Postal code: 32353 /32420
- ^{1} French Land Register data, which excludes lakes, ponds, glaciers > 1 km^{2} (0.386 sq mi or 247 acres) and river estuaries.

Sabaillan (French pronunciation: [sabajɑ̃]; Occitan: Sabalhan) is a commune in the Gers department in southwestern France.

The village is notable for the presence of several duck and geese farms specialising in the production of foie gras, one of the main products of the region.

== Geography ==
The river Gesse forms all of the commune's southeastern border.

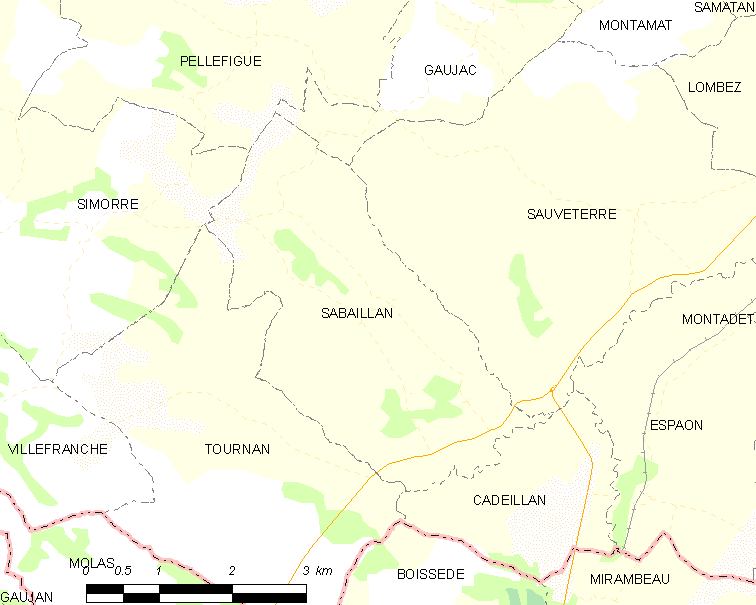
Sabaillan and its surrounding communes

== Population ==
Historical population
Year	Pop.	±% p.a.
1968	172	—
1975	171	−0.08%
1982	158	−1.12%
1990	139	−1.59%
1999	153	+1.07%
2007	156	+0.24%
2012	155	−0.13%
2017	148	−0.92%
2023	153	+0.56%
Source: INSEE

== See also ==
- Communes of the Gers department
