= Puymaurin =

- Commune
- Coat of arms
- Location of Puymaurin
- Location within France Location within Occitanie
- Coordinates: 43°22′26″N 0°45′57″E
- Country: France
- Region: Occitania
- Department: Haute-Garonne
- Arrondissement: Saint-Gaudens
- Canton: Cazères

Government
  - Mayor (2020–2026): Valentin Biason
- Area^{1}: 22.24 km^{2} (8.59 sq mi)
- Elevation: 290 m (950 ft)
- Highest elevation: 312 m (1,024 ft)
- Lowest elevation: 197 m (646 ft)
- Population (2023): 309
  - Density: 13.9/km^{2} (36.0/sq mi)
- Time zone: UTC+01:00 (CET)
  - Summer (DST): UTC+02:00 (CEST)
- INSEE/Postal code: 31443 /31230
- ^{1} French Land Register data, which excludes lakes, ponds, glaciers > 1 km^{2} (0.386 sq mi or 247 acres) and river estuaries.

Puymaurin (French pronunciation: [pɥimoʁɛ̃]; Occitan: Poimaurin) is a commune in the Haute-Garonne department in southwestern France.

== Geography ==
The river Gesse flows northeast through the commune.

== Population ==
Historical population
Year	Pop.	±% p.a.
1968	408	—
1975	380	−1.01%
1982	365	−0.57%
1990	321	−1.59%
1999	297	−0.86%
2007	297	+0.00%
2012	302	+0.33%
2017	296	−0.40%
2023	309	+0.72%
Source: INSEE

== See also ==
- Communes of the Haute-Garonne department
