= Nizan-Gesse =

- Commune
- Location of Nizan-Gesse
- Location within France Location within Occitanie
- Coordinates: 43°14′03″N 0°35′54″E
- Country: France
- Region: Occitania
- Department: Haute-Garonne
- Arrondissement: Saint-Gaudens
- Canton: Saint-Gaudens

Government
  - Mayor (2020–2026): Mathieu Solle
- Area^{1}: 8.64 km^{2} (3.34 sq mi)
- Elevation: 390 m (1,280 ft)
- Highest elevation: 476 m (1,562 ft)
- Lowest elevation: 320 m (1,050 ft)
- Population (2023): 105
  - Density: 12.2/km^{2} (31.5/sq mi)
- Time zone: UTC+01:00 (CET)
  - Summer (DST): UTC+02:00 (CEST)
- INSEE/Postal code: 31398 /31350
- ^{1} French Land Register data, which excludes lakes, ponds, glaciers > 1 km^{2} (0.386 sq mi or 247 acres) and river estuaries.

Nizan-Gesse (French pronunciation: [nizɑ̃ ʒɛs]; Occitan: Nisan de Gessa) is a commune in the Haute-Garonne department in southwestern France.

== Geography ==
The river Gesse forms part of the commune's northwestern border.

== Population ==
Historical population
Year	Pop.	±% p.a.
1968	132	—
1975	116	−1.83%
1982	103	−1.68%
1990	88	−1.95%
1999	84	−0.52%
2007	90	+0.87%
2012	83	−1.61%
2017	87	+0.95%
2023	105	+3.18%
Source: INSEE

== See also ==
- Communes of the Haute-Garonne department
