= Acolin =

River in central France

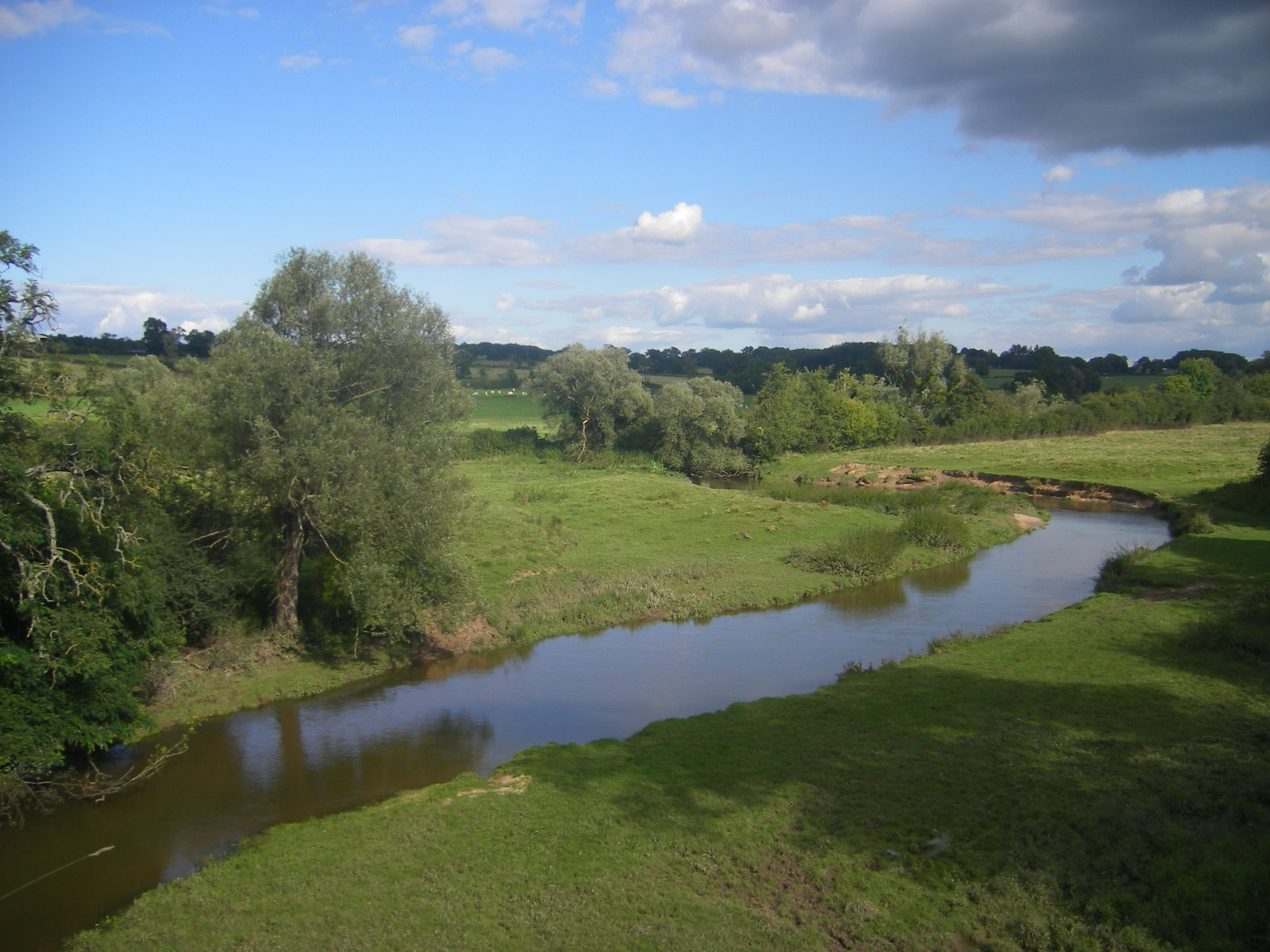
- The Acolin near Decize

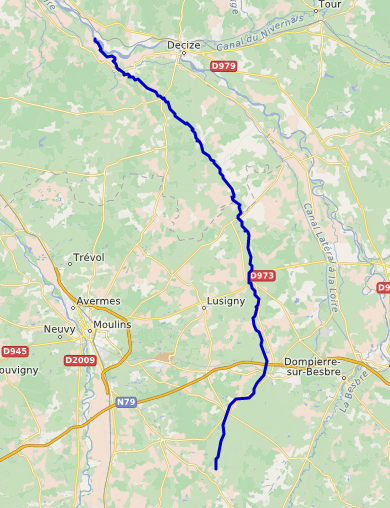

Location
- Country: France

Physical characteristics
- Source
  - location: Massif Central
- Mouth
  - location: Loire
  - coordinates: 46°49′41″N 3°21′50″E
- Length: 62.6 km (38.9 mi)

Basin features
- Progression: Loire→ Atlantic Ocean

The Acolin (French pronunciation: [akɔlɛ̃]) is a 62.6-kilometre (38.9 mi) long river in France. It is a left tributary of the Loire, which it meets near Decize. It flows through the departments of Allier and Nièvre.

== Course ==
The Acolin has its source south of the town of Mercy (Allier) in a wooded area covered with many ponds. The source is some 20 kilometres (12 mi) south-east of Moulins. Its basin drains the area between the lower reaches of the Allier in the west and the Besbre to the east. Like its neighbors, it maintains a northerly direction, for more than 60 kilometres (37 mi) and eventually empties into the Loire near the town of Avril-sur-Loire, just downstream from Decize.
