= Bazordan =

- Commune
- Coat of arms
- Location of Bazordan
- Location within France Location within Occitanie
- Coordinates: 43°13′25″N 0°33′09″E
- Country: France
- Region: Occitania
- Department: Hautes-Pyrénées
- Arrondissement: Tarbes
- Canton: Les Coteaux

Government
  - Mayor (2020–2026): Josiane Lagarde
- Area^{1}: 9.22 km^{2} (3.56 sq mi)
- Elevation: 475 m (1,558 ft)
- Highest elevation: 494 m (1,621 ft)
- Lowest elevation: 350 m (1,150 ft)
- Population (2023): 111
  - Density: 12.0/km^{2} (31.2/sq mi)
- Time zone: UTC+01:00 (CET)
  - Summer (DST): UTC+02:00 (CEST)
- INSEE/Postal code: 65074 /65670
- ^{1} French Land Register data, which excludes lakes, ponds, glaciers > 1 km^{2} (0.386 sq mi or 247 acres) and river estuaries.

Bazordan (French pronunciation: [bazɔʁdɑ̃]; Occitan: Bajordan) is a commune in the Hautes-Pyrénées department in southwestern France.

== Population ==
Historical population
Year	Pop.	±% p.a.
1968	191	—
1975	176	−1.16%
1982	179	+0.24%
1990	162	−1.24%
1999	157	−0.35%
2007	129	−2.43%
2012	119	−1.60%
2017	113	−1.03%
2023	111	−0.30%
Source: INSEE

== Geography ==
The river Gesse flows northeast through the commune.

== See also ==
- Communes of the Hautes-Pyrénées department
