= Villecomtal-sur-Arros =

- Commune
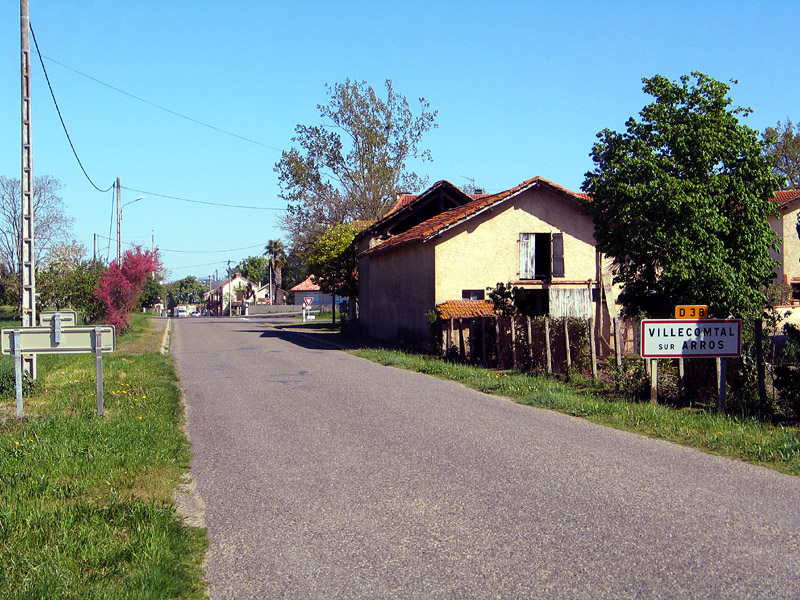
- The road into Villecomtal-sur-Arros
- Location of Villecomtal-sur-Arros
- Location within France Location within Occitanie
- Coordinates: 43°24′01″N 0°11′58″E
- Country: France
- Region: Occitania
- Department: Gers
- Arrondissement: Mirande
- Canton: Mirande-Astarac

Government
  - Mayor (2020–2026): Matthieu Moura
- Area^{1}: 11.17 km^{2} (4.31 sq mi)
- Elevation: 176 m (577 ft)
- Highest elevation: 315 m (1,033 ft)
- Lowest elevation: 168 m (551 ft)
- Population (2023): 831
  - Density: 74.4/km^{2} (193/sq mi)
- Time zone: UTC+01:00 (CET)
  - Summer (DST): UTC+02:00 (CEST)
- INSEE/Postal code: 32464 /32730
- ^{1} French Land Register data, which excludes lakes, ponds, glaciers > 1 km^{2} (0.386 sq mi or 247 acres) and river estuaries.

Villecomtal-sur-Arros (French pronunciation: [vilkɔ̃tal syʁ aʁɔs], literally Villecomtal on Arros; Occitan: Vilacomdau d'Arròs) is a commune in the Gers department in southwestern France.

== Geography ==
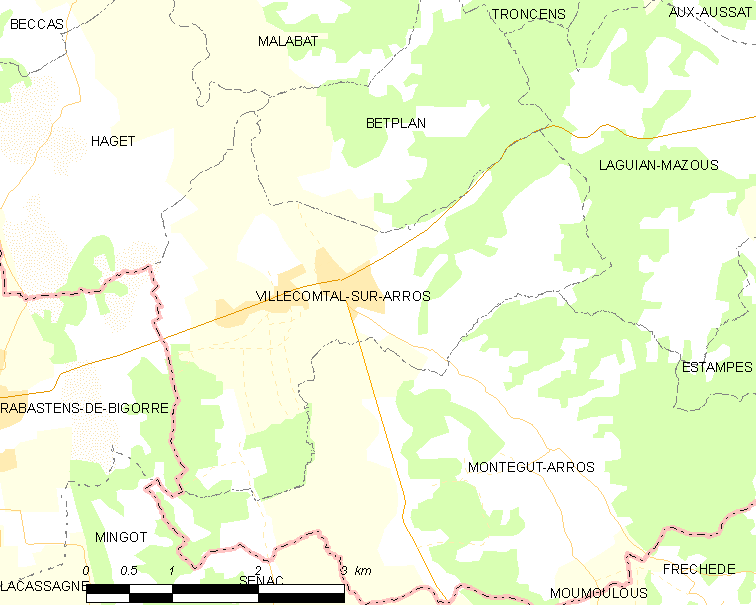
Villecomtal-sur-Arros and its surrounding communes

== Population ==
Historical population
Year	Pop.	±% p.a.
1968	572	—
1975	642	+1.66%
1982	671	+0.63%
1990	773	+1.78%
1999	743	−0.44%
2007	809	+1.07%
2012	824	+0.37%
2017	853	+0.69%
2023	831	−0.43%
Source: INSEE

== See also ==
- Communes of the Gers department
