= Plateau de Lannemezan =

Coordinates: 43°10′N 0°23′E

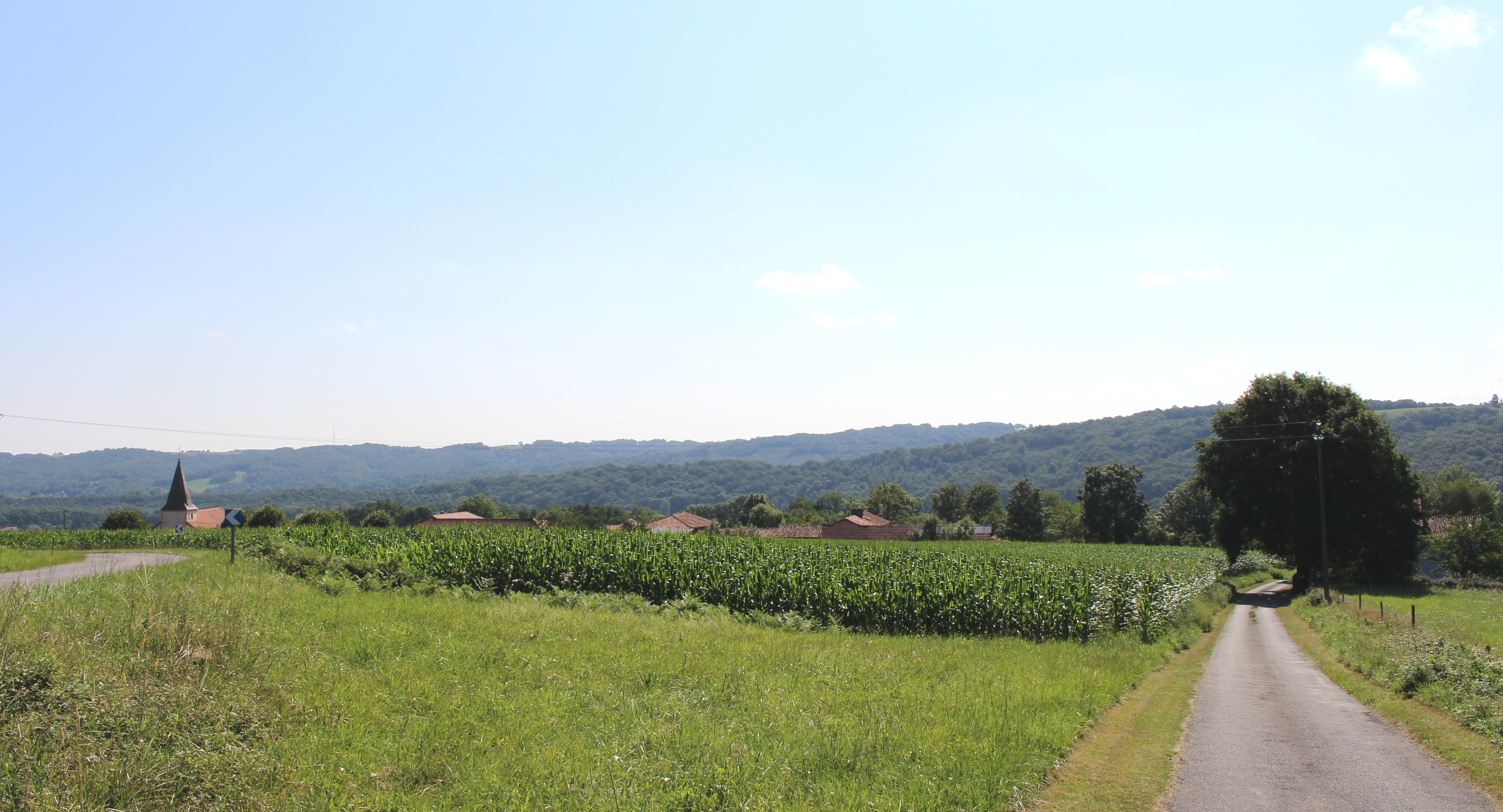

The plateau de Lannemezan (French pronunciation: [plato də lanməzɑ̃]) is a plateau in the Hautes-Pyrénées département, in the Pyrenees foothills, not far from Spain, southwestern France, with about 10,000 inhabitants.

Its name comes from the city Lannemezan, which lies in the middle of the plateau. The plateau of Lannemezan, through 155 years of work (1840–1995), can be considered the water tower across Biscay. The Canal de la Neste, along with more than 28 km takes its water from the Beyréde Jumet dam in the Aure Valley fed by the lakes in the Néouvielle Massif (Aumar-Aubert-Orédon) and Louron (caillaouas) and ends on the Plateau de Lannemezan through the channel of sludge.

Numerous rivers have their source on the plateau:

- Garonne basin: Gesse, Petite Baïse, Gers, Save, Gimone, Baïse, Arrats, Louge, Touch, Osse
- Adour basin: Bouès

== Notes ==
- article is based on the equivalent article from the French Wikipedia, consulted on January 19th 2009.
