= Banios =

- Commune
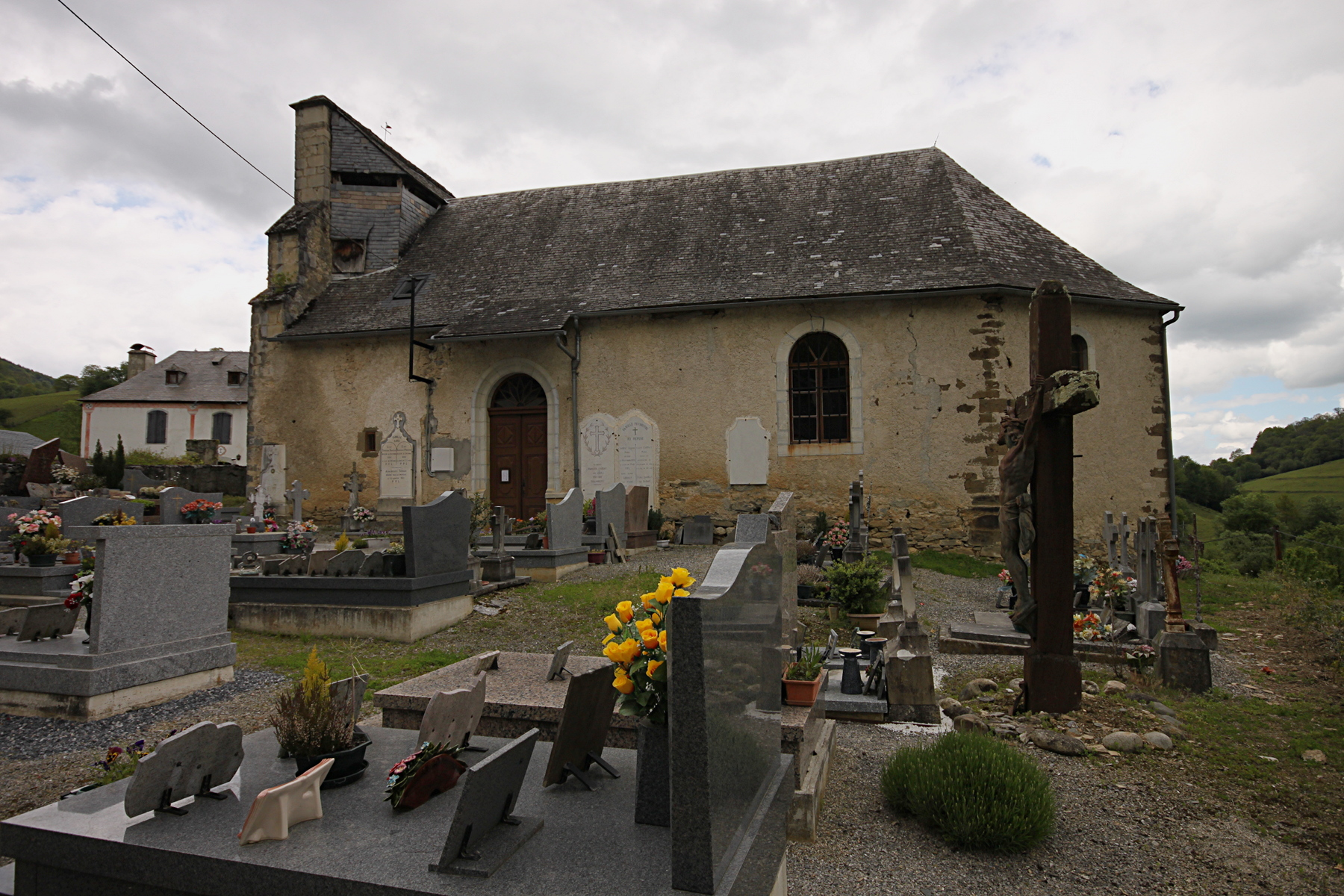
- The church of the Nativity of the Blessed Virgin Mary at Banios

- Coat of arms
- Location of Banios
- Location within France Location within Occitanie
- Coordinates: 43°02′44″N 0°14′07″E
- Country: France
- Region: Occitania
- Department: Hautes-Pyrénées
- Arrondissement: Bagnères-de-Bigorre
- Canton: La Vallée de l'Arros et des Baïses
- Intercommunality: Haute-Bigorre

Government
  - Mayor (2020–2026): François Abat
- Area^{1}: 5.26 km^{2} (2.03 sq mi)
- Elevation: 550 m (1,800 ft)
- Highest elevation: 1,145 m (3,757 ft)
- Lowest elevation: 468 m (1,535 ft)
- Population (2023): 66
  - Density: 13/km^{2} (32/sq mi)
- Time zone: UTC+01:00 (CET)
  - Summer (DST): UTC+02:00 (CEST)
- INSEE/Postal code: 65060 /65200
- ^{1} French Land Register data, which excludes lakes, ponds, glaciers > 1 km^{2} (0.386 sq mi or 247 acres) and river estuaries.

Banios is a commune in the Hautes-Pyrénées department in southwestern France.

== Heraldry ==
Banios	Or, a castle with a keep sable set on a mountain vert; on a chief azure a fleur-de-lis or between two flying doves affronted argent.

== Population ==
Historical population
Year	Pop.	±% p.a.
1968	72	—
1975	81	+1.70%
1982	75	−1.09%
1990	50	−4.94%
1999	43	−1.66%
2007	54	+2.89%
2012	53	−0.37%
2017	53	+0.00%
2023	66	+3.72%
Source: INSEE

== See also ==
- Communes of the Hautes-Pyrénées department
