= Luby-Betmont =

- Commune
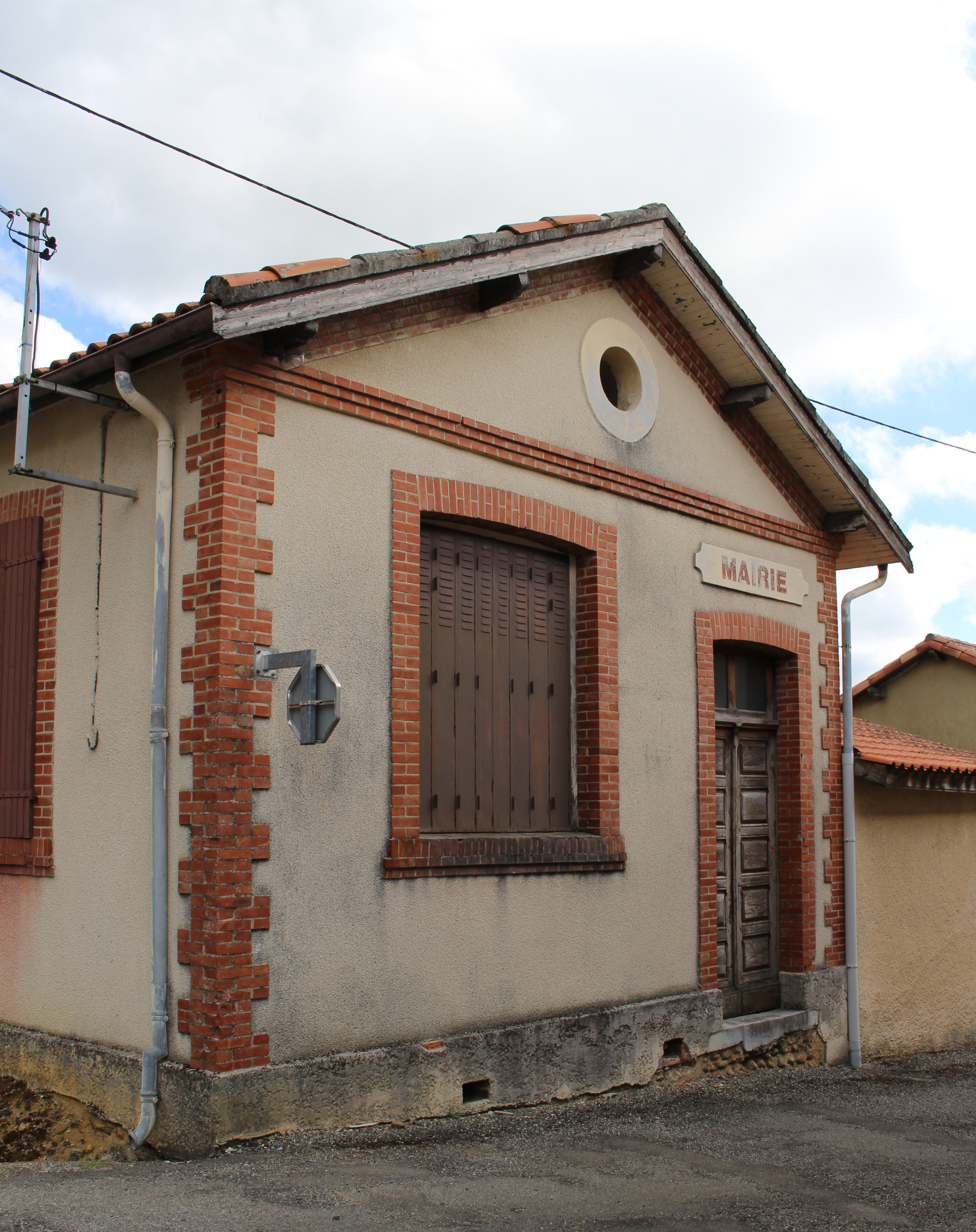
- Town hall

- Coat of arms
- Location of Luby-Betmont
- Location within France Location within Occitanie
- Coordinates: 43°17′48″N 0°17′36″E
- Country: France
- Region: Occitania
- Department: Hautes-Pyrénées
- Arrondissement: Tarbes
- Canton: Les Coteaux
- Intercommunality: Pays de Trie et Magnoac

Government
  - Mayor (2020–2026): Yves Cieutat
- Area^{1}: 7.16 km^{2} (2.76 sq mi)
- Elevation: 225 m (738 ft)
- Highest elevation: 385 m (1,263 ft)
- Lowest elevation: 252 m (827 ft)
- Population (2023): 104
  - Density: 14.5/km^{2} (37.6/sq mi)
- Time zone: UTC+01:00 (CET)
  - Summer (DST): UTC+02:00 (CEST)
- INSEE/Postal code: 65289 /65220
- ^{1} French Land Register data, which excludes lakes, ponds, glaciers > 1 km^{2} (0.386 sq mi or 247 acres) and river estuaries.

Luby-Betmont (French pronunciation: [lybi bɛtmɔ̃]; Occitan: Lube e Bèthmont) is a commune in the Hautes-Pyrénées department in south-western France.

The village church has the curious feature of chiming the hours twice. The reason for this is uncertain, although it may have been to allow workers in the fields a second chance to confirm the hour in order to be sure when to return to the farms for meals. The exceptions to the double chiming are at 7am and noon, when a more complex bell ringing takes place prior to the masses.

The village sits on the D11, just south of the junction with the D632 and forms the head of the annual Course de Cote ( hill climb) which starts at the neighbouring village of Osmets. The village church has the common French rural feature of chiming the hours twice. The reason for this is unclear, but generally accepted as being a means for agricultural workers to check the time accurately in order to be sure when to return to the village or home for meals. The exception to the double chiming are at 7am and noon, when a more complex bell ringing takes place prior to mass.

== See also ==
- Communes of the Hautes-Pyrénées department
