= Chelle-Debat =

- Commune
- Coat of arms
- Location of Chelle-Debat
- Location within France Location within Occitanie
- Coordinates: 43°18′21″N 0°13′51″E
- Country: France
- Region: Occitania
- Department: Hautes-Pyrénées
- Arrondissement: Tarbes
- Canton: Les Coteaux
- Intercommunality: Coteaux du Val d'Arros

Government
  - Mayor (2020–2026): Nathalie Lacoste
- Area^{1}: 8.69 km^{2} (3.36 sq mi)
- Elevation: 200 m (660 ft)
- Highest elevation: 347 m (1,138 ft)
- Lowest elevation: 190 m (620 ft)
- Population (2023): 220
  - Density: 25/km^{2} (66/sq mi)
- Time zone: UTC+01:00 (CET)
  - Summer (DST): UTC+02:00 (CEST)
- INSEE/Postal code: 65142 /65350
- ^{1} French Land Register data, which excludes lakes, ponds, glaciers > 1 km^{2} (0.386 sq mi or 247 acres) and river estuaries.

Chelle-Debat is a commune in the Hautes-Pyrénées department in south-western France.

== See also ==
- Communes of the Hautes-Pyrénées department
