= Capvern =

- Commune
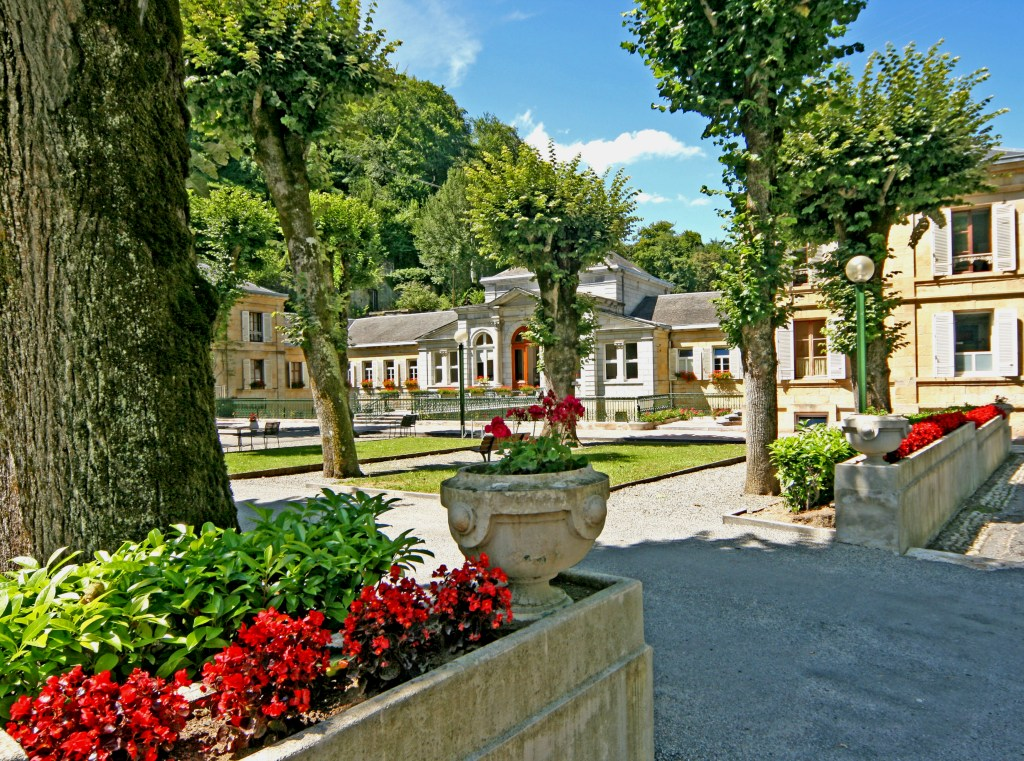
- The town baths

- Coat of arms
- Location of Capvern
- Location within France Location within Occitanie
- Coordinates: 43°06′N 0°19′E
- Country: France
- Region: Occitania
- Department: Hautes-Pyrénées
- Arrondissement: Bagnères-de-Bigorre
- Canton: Neste, Aure et Louron

Government
  - Mayor (2020–2026): Jean-Paul Laran
- Area^{1}: 21.84 km^{2} (8.43 sq mi)
- Elevation: 608 m (1,995 ft)
- Highest elevation: 664 m (2,178 ft)
- Lowest elevation: 358 m (1,175 ft)
- Population (2023): 1,298
  - Density: 59.43/km^{2} (153.9/sq mi)
- Time zone: UTC+01:00 (CET)
  - Summer (DST): UTC+02:00 (CEST)
- INSEE/Postal code: 65127 /65130
- ^{1} French Land Register data, which excludes lakes, ponds, glaciers > 1 km^{2} (0.386 sq mi or 247 acres) and river estuaries.

Capvern (French pronunciation: [kavɛʁ], [kapvɛʁn]; Occitan: Capvèrn, [kaβˈβɛɾ], [kaβˈβɛɾn]) or Capvern-les-Bains (French pronunciation: [kavɛʁ le bɛ̃]), is a commune in the department of Hautes-Pyrénées, Occitania, southwestern France. Capvern station has rail connections to Toulouse, Tarbes and Pau.

== See also ==
- Communes of the Hautes-Pyrénées department
