= Gimone =

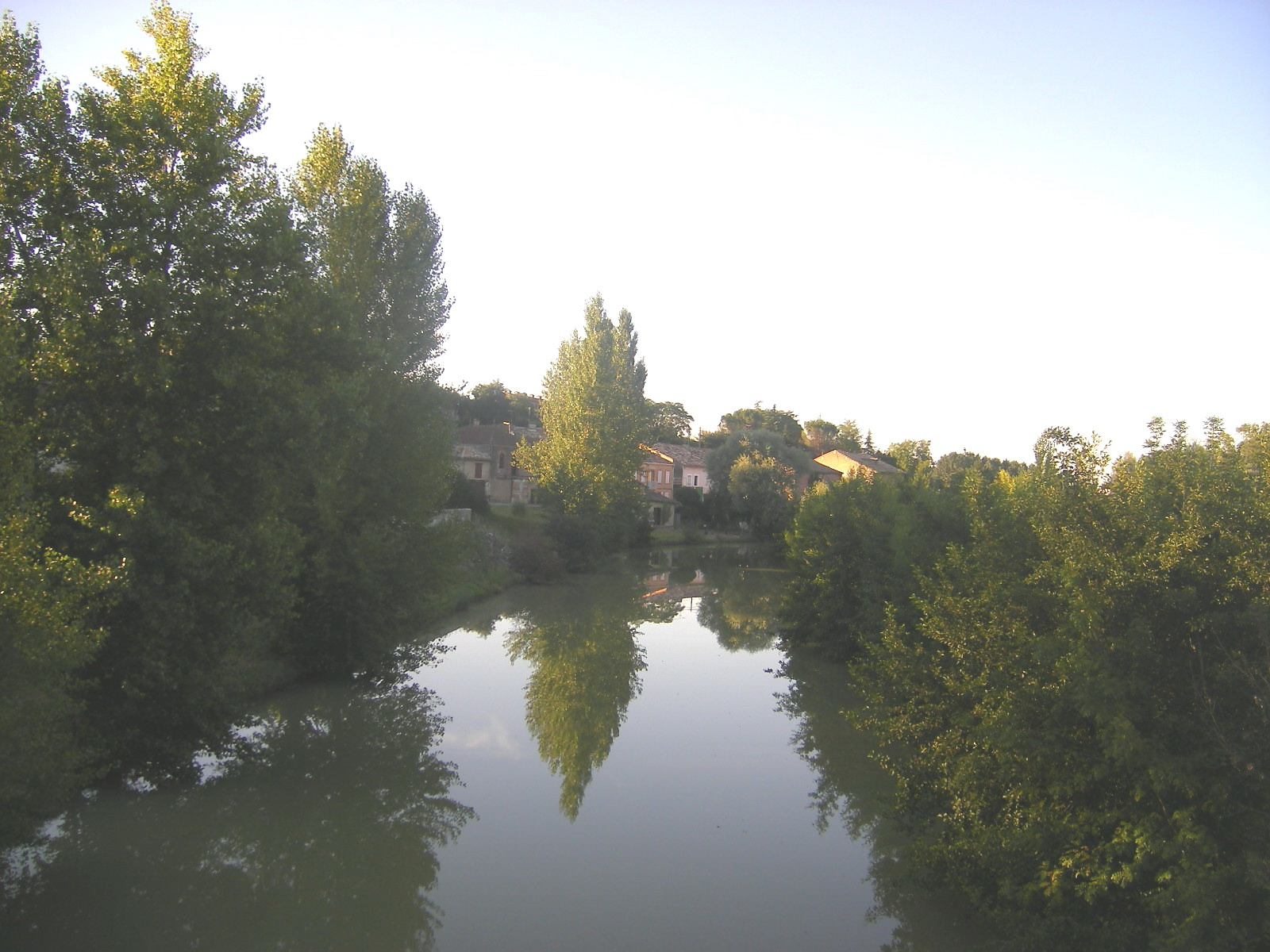

- Location within France Location within Occitanie

Location
- Country: France

Physical characteristics
- Source
  - location: Plateau de Lannemezan
- Mouth
  - location: Garonne
  - coordinates: 44°0′48″N 1°6′19″E
- Length: 136 km (85 mi)
- Basin size: 840 km^{2} (320 sq mi)
- Discharge
  - average: 3 m^{3}/s (110 cu ft/s)

Basin features
- Progression: Garonne→ Gironde estuary→ Atlantic Ocean

The Gimone (French pronunciation: [ʒimɔn]; Gascon: Gimona) is a 136-kilometre (85 mi) river in south-western France, left tributary of the Garonne. Its source is in the foothills of the Pyrenees, near Lannemezan. It flows north through the following départements and towns:

- Hautes-Pyrénées
- Gers: Saramon, Gimont
- Tarn-et-Garonne: Beaumont-de-Lomagne

The Gimone flows into the Garonne near Castelsarrasin.
