= Save (Garonne) =

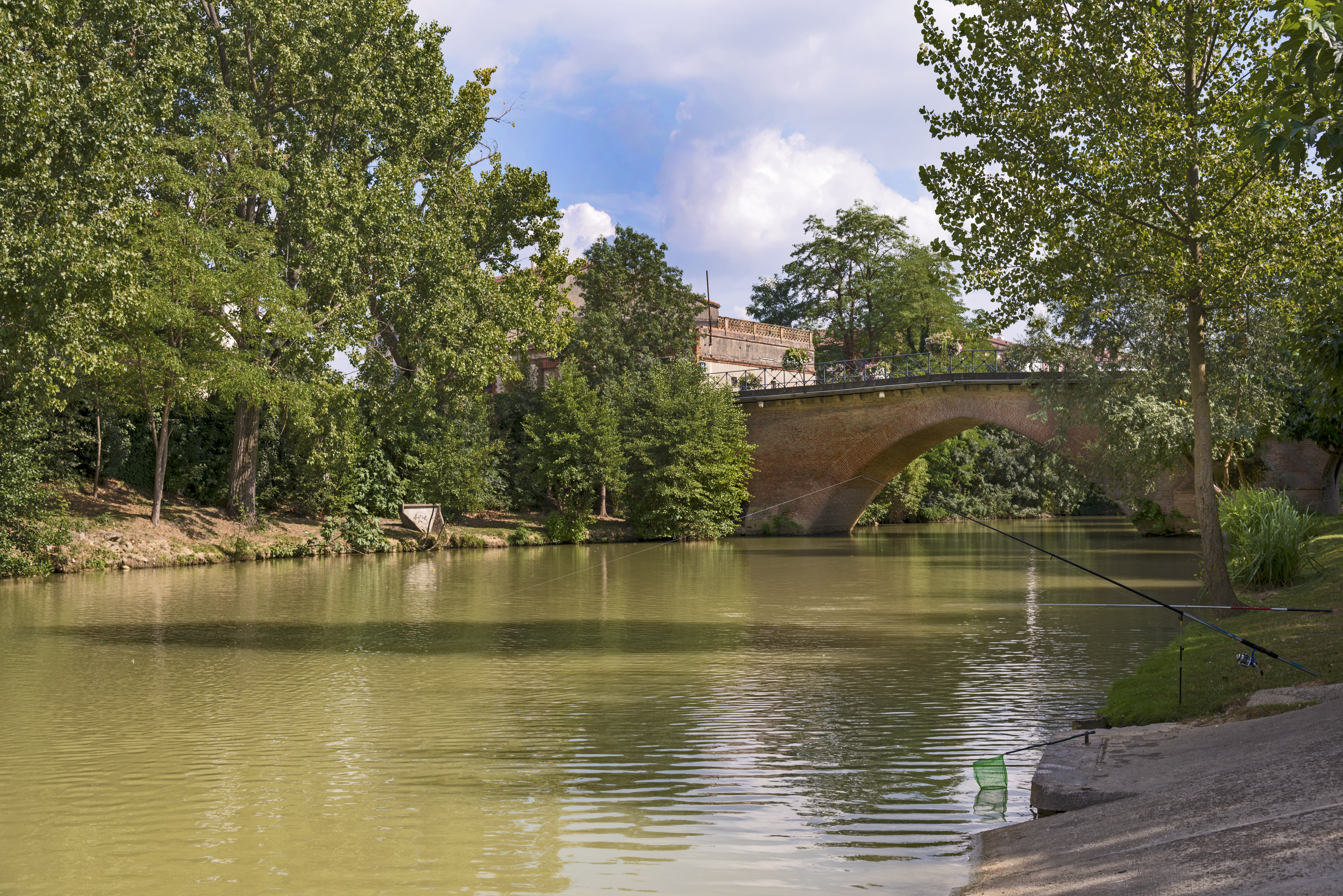

- Location within France Location within Occitanie

Location
- Country: France

Physical characteristics
- Source
  - location: Plateau de Lannemezan
- Mouth
  - location: Garonne
  - coordinates: 43°47′32″N 1°16′41″E
- Length: 143.8 km (89.4 mi)
- Basin size: 1,152 km^{2} (445 sq mi)

Basin features
- Progression: Garonne→ Gironde estuary→ Atlantic Ocean

The Save (French pronunciation: [sav]; Occitan: Sava) is a 144 km long river in southern France, left tributary of the Garonne. Its source is in the northern foothills of the Pyrenees, south of Lannemezan. It flows north-east through the following départements and cities:

- Hautes-Pyrénées.
- Haute-Garonne: Grenade, L'Isle-en-Dodon.
- Gers: L'Isle-Jourdain.

It flows into the Garonne in Grenade, north of Toulouse.

Among its tributaries is the Gesse.
