= Luz Ardiden =

Ski resort in France

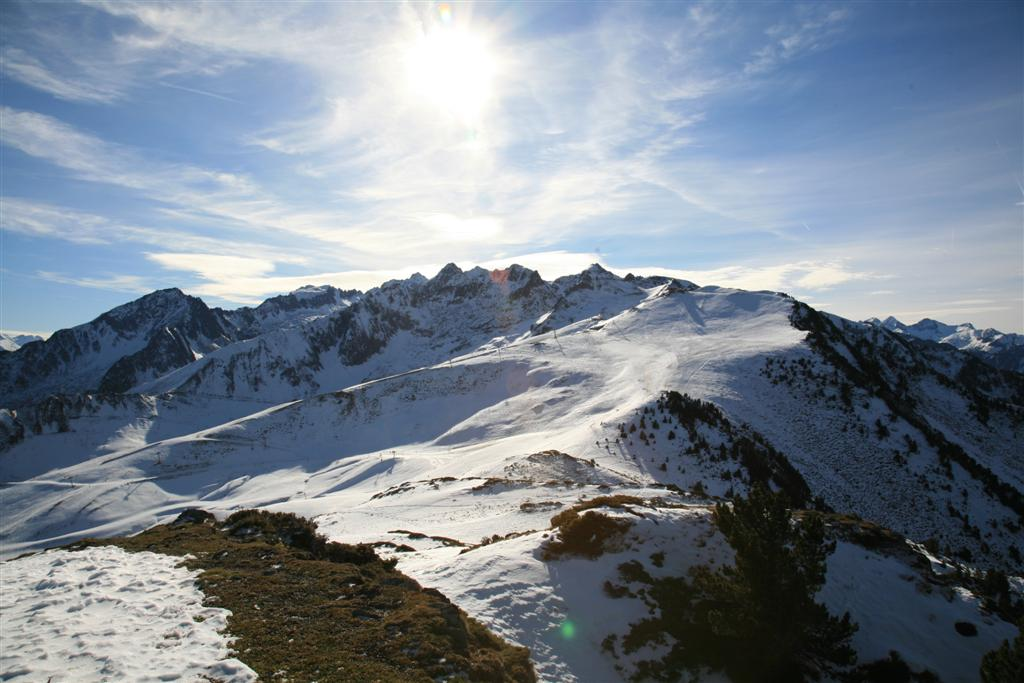

- Location within France Location within Occitanie Location within Pyrenees
- Location: Luz-Saint-Sauveur, Hautes-Pyrénées, Occitanie, France
- Nearest city: Pau
- Coordinates: 42°53′8″N 0°3′41″W
- Top elevation: 2,500 m (8,200 ft)
- Base elevation: 1,680 m (5,510 ft)
- Trails: 26
- Lift system: 15
- Website: luz-ardiden.com

Luz Ardiden is a ski resort in the Pyrenees. It is situated in the Hautes-Pyrénées department, in the Occitanie Region. The ski resort lies at a height of 1,720 m (5,640 ft) and was opened on 16 January 1975. In recent years the road to Luz Ardiden has served as an occasional stage finish for the Tour de France and the Vuelta a España.

== Geography ==
Luz-Ardiden is located in the north of the Ardiden massif in the Pyrenees, at an altitude of between 1,680 and 2,500 m (5,510 and 8,200 ft). The ski resort is located west-north-west of the town centre of Luz-Saint-Sauveur, 12 km (7.5 mi) by road.

== History ==
The idea of a ski resort at Luz-Ardiden was developed by the local elected officials of the five communes of Luz-Saint-Sauveur, Grust, Sazos, Sassis and Viscos from 1966. The work began with the opening of the road from Grust in 1970. The ski station opened on 16 January 1975 at the Béderet site. The Aulian sector was opened the following season.

== Details of climb ==
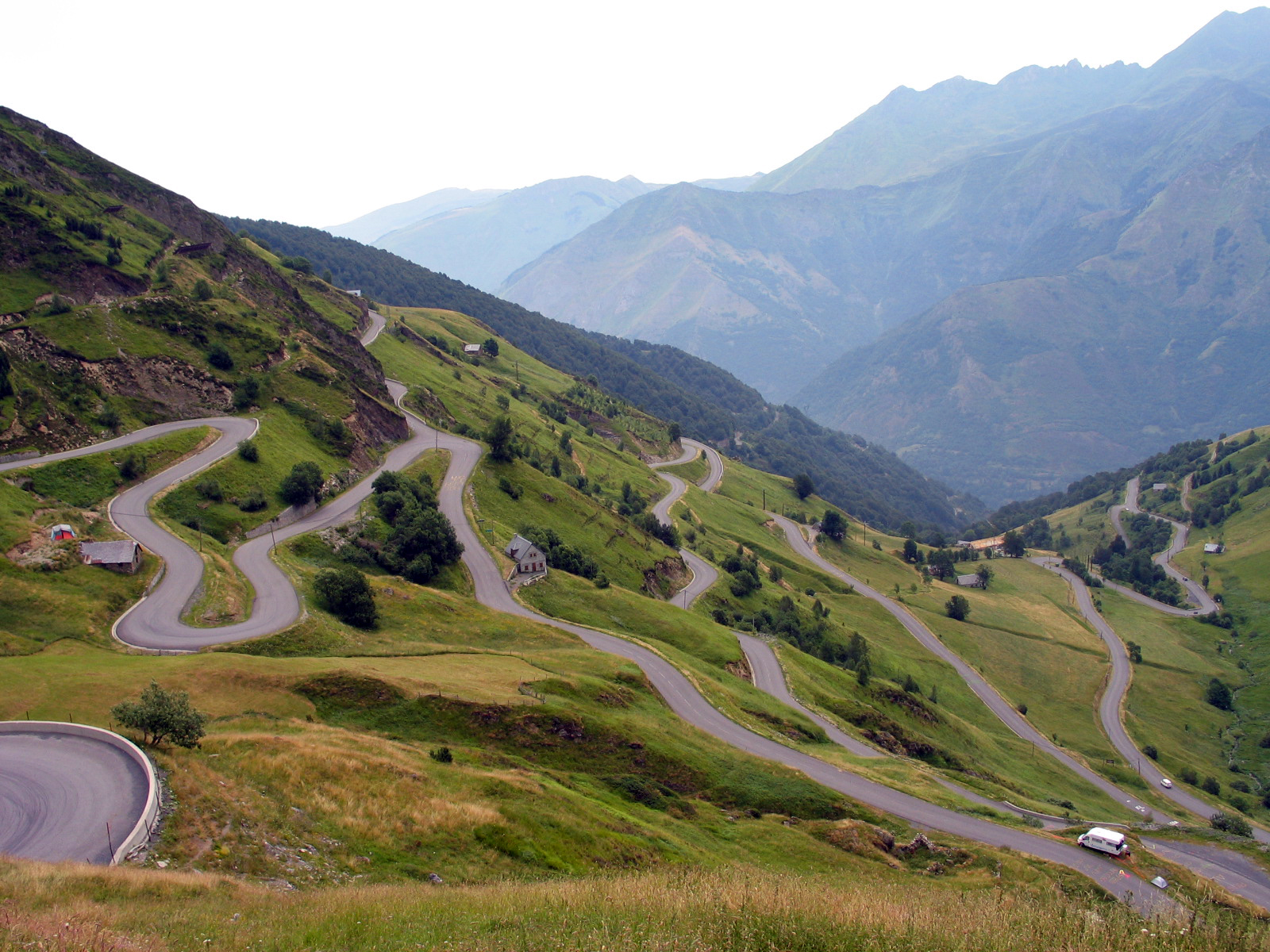
The road up to Luz Ardiden.

Starting from Luz-Saint-Sauveur (710 m (2,330 ft)), the climb to Luz Ardiden (1,720 m (5,640 ft)) is 14.7 km (9.1 mi) long. The elevation gain over this distance is 1,010 m (3,310 ft) (an average of 6.9%). The maximum gradient is 10%.

== Cycling ==
Luz Ardiden has been the finish-line for Tour de France and Vuelta a España stages several times.

=== Tour de France stage finishes ===
Year	Stage	Category	Start of stage	Distance	Stage winner	Yellow jersey	Ref
2021	18	HC	Pau	129.7 km (80.6 mi)	Tadej Pogačar (SLO)	Tadej Pogačar (SLO)	
2011	12	HC	Cugnaux	211.0 km (131.1 mi)	Samuel Sánchez (ESP)	Thomas Voeckler (FRA)	
2003	15	HC	Bagnères de Bigorre	159.5 km (99.1 mi)	~~Lance Armstrong (USA)~~	~~Lance Armstrong (USA)~~	
2001	14	HC	Tarbes	144 km (89 mi)	Roberto Laiseka (ESP)	~~Lance Armstrong (USA)~~	
1994	12	HC	Lourdes	204.5 km (127.1 mi)	Richard Virenque (FRA)	Miguel Indurain (ESP)	
1990	16	HC	Blagnac	215 km (134 mi)	Miguel Indurain (ESP)	Claudio Chiappucci (ITA)	
1988	15	HC	Saint-Girons	187.5 km (116.5 mi)	Laudelino Cubino Gonzalez (ESP)	Pedro Delgado (ESP)	
1987	14	HC	Pau	166 km (103 mi)	Dag Otto Lauritzen (NOR)	Charly Mottet (FRA)	
1985	17	HC	Toulouse	209.5 km (130.2 mi)	Pedro Delgado (ESP)	Bernard Hinault (FRA)	

Stage 17 of the 1985 Tour de France, which included Luz Ardiden, was the scene of an infamous moment in cycling history. During the stage, Greg LeMond and a rival rider, Stephen Roche, were far ahead of the pack when the team boss Bernard Tapie and coach Paul Köchli asked LeMond to slow down, saying that Hinault was 45 seconds behind. LeMond refrained from attacking and waited at the stage's finish where he realized he'd been misled; Hinault was in fact more than three minutes behind. Hinault went on to win that year's Tour by 1 minute 42 seconds; in return for his assistance, LeMond was assured by Hinault that he would support LeMond the following year.

During the 1990 Tour Claudio Chiappucci had surprised all of the pre-race favorites by still leading the race by over two minutes going into stage 16, which ended in a mountaintop finish on Luz Ardiden. Late in the stage after the race had come back together Fabio Parra launched an attack which only LeMond and Miguel Induráin could answer. LeMond and Induráin quickly caught and dropped Parra and LeMond set the pace up the final climb. By the time they reached the summit LeMond had all but secured his third Tour de France victory and sat up as Induráin claimed the stage win. This performance on Luz Ardiden all but secured the victory for LeMond, even though there were still several stages to go, because it was well known that he was a far better time trialist than Chiappucci and would easily make up the +0:05 deficit which meant, in essence, that aside from crashing out, it was now LeMond's Tour to win or lose. Even though Induráin had yet to win the first of his five Tours, this would be the final (non-ITT) victory of his career.

During the 2003 Tour de France, Lance Armstrong was riding with Iban Mayo at the start of the climb to Luz Ardiden when Armstrong crashed, bringing Mayo down with him. The fall was caused when Armstrong caught the handlebar of his bike on the strap of a spectator's bag. Jan Ulrich, who was riding just behind Armstrong and Mayo, avoided the crash, and in an act of chivalry he slowed to wait for the fallen riders. Armstrong would go on to win by his smallest ever margin.

=== Vuelta a España stage finishes ===
Year	Stage	Category	Start of stage	Distance	Stage winner	GC leader	Ref
1995	17	HC	Naut Aran	179 km (111 mi)	Laurent Jalabert	Laurent Jalabert	
1992	9	HC	Vielha	144 km (89 mi)	Laudelino Cubino	Jesus Montoya	

== See also ==
- List of highest paved roads in Europe
- List of mountain passes
