= Château de Sainte-Marie =

Ruined castle in Hautes-Pyrénées, France

Coordinates: 42°52′33″N 0°00′02″E

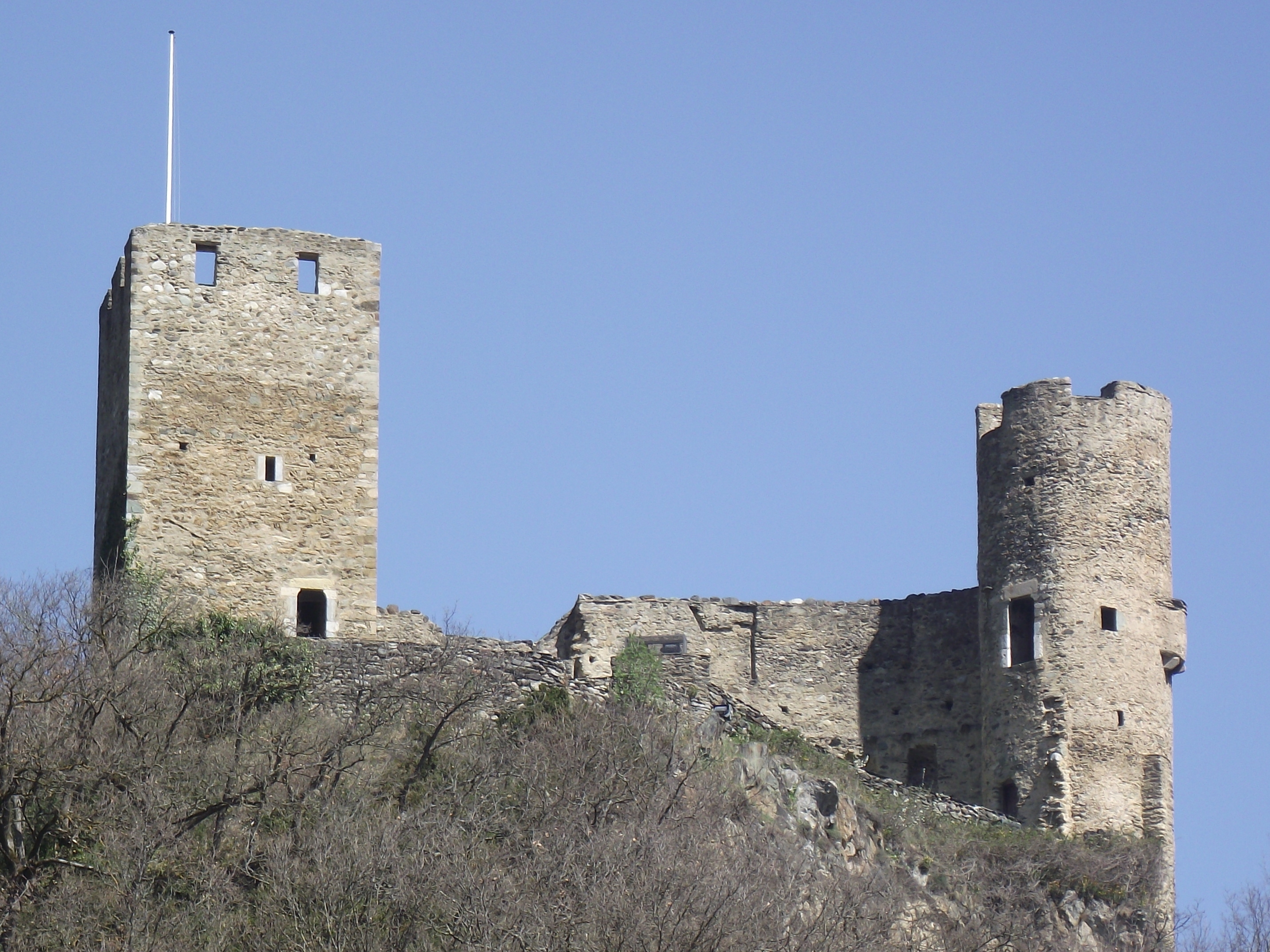
Ruins of the Château Sainte-Marie seen from Luz-Saint-Sauveur

The Château de Sainte-Marie is a ruined castle in the commune of Esterre in the Hautes-Pyrénées département of France.

== Description ==
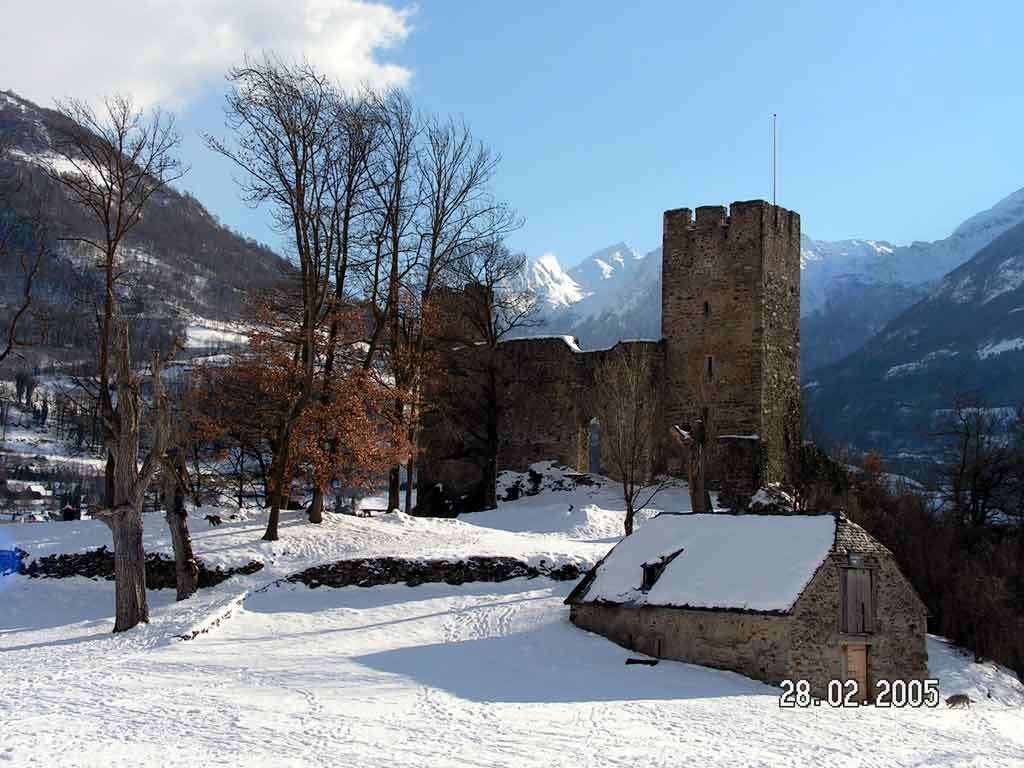
The castle in winter

The only remains are a round tower and a square keep. The site is at an altitude of 630 metres and dominates the villages of Luz-Saint-Sauveur, Esquièze-Sère and Esterre. According to the Petit Futé guide, "the panorama is as famous as the stones".

The castle was largely rebuilt by the English in the second half of the 14th century. Its enceinte is very narrow and it was clearly the base of a war leader and residence of a lord. The square, northern tower is pierced by arrowslits with crenellations at the summit. In the late 19th century the tower was being used as a barn and in a poor state. The round keep was in an equally distressed condition.

== History ==
Perched on the summit of a rocky outcrop, it was over the centuries a true strategic site for the protection of the valley and also a place of refuge for the population. Its construction dates from the 10th century by the Count of Bigorre, Centule III, Its origin, however, seems older because the Arabs would have occupied it. In the 14th century, it was occupied by the Knights Hospitaller. Then the English took possession until 1404, when Jean de Bourbon, the Count of Clermont, helped by the inhabitants of the valley commanded by Aougé de Coufitte, drove them out and put an end to the English occupation of the valley. The castle was then gradually abandoned.

== Preservation ==
The castle is privately owned. The remains were inscribed to the list of monument historiques in 1930.

Its restoration was undertaken in the 1980s, thus saving one of the most outstanding vestiges of the history of the valley. Until 1988, it was filled with brambles. Claude Massoure, then president of the commission syndicale, arranged a 30-year lease with the owners of the site, the Fontobo family. This allowed its consolidation and lighting to make the place now widely visited. This lease expired in 2018 and future access to the castle was in doubt until a new lease was agreed with the owners in April.

== In popular culture ==
Arsène Lupin, the fictional gentleman thief, made a fantastic escape there by a tunnel. Many other legends are attached to the castle.

== See also ==
- List of castles in France
