= Viella =

Viella may refer to:

- Viella, Hautes-Pyrénées, France
- Viella, Gers, France
- Viella, the Italian name for the bowed string instrument Vielle
- Viella, an Italian academic publisher

== See also ==
- Vielha e Mijaran, capital of the Aran Valley, in Catalonia, Spain. Spelled Viella in Catalan and Spanish.
- Viyella, a trademarked textile
