= Chèze =

- Commune
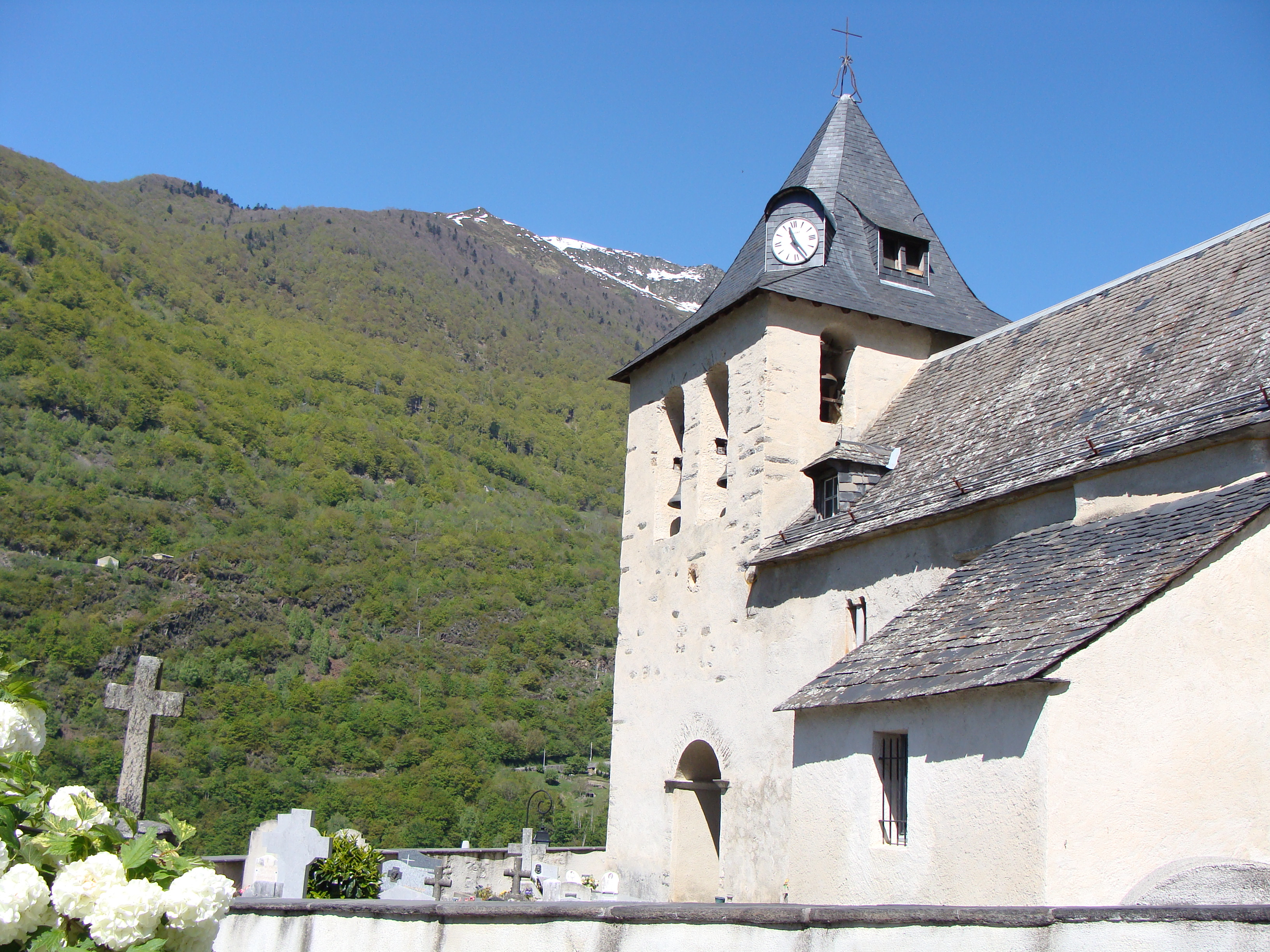
- The church

- Coat of arms
- Location of Chèze
- Location within France Location within Occitanie
- Coordinates: 42°54′26″N 0°01′43″W
- Country: France
- Region: Occitania
- Department: Hautes-Pyrénées
- Arrondissement: Argelès-Gazost
- Canton: La Vallée des Gaves
- Area^{1}: 10.07 km^{2} (3.89 sq mi)
- Elevation: 730 m (2,400 ft)
- Highest elevation: 2,309 m (7,575 ft)
- Lowest elevation: 520 m (1,710 ft)
- Population (2023): 50
  - Density: 5.0/km^{2} (13/sq mi)
- Time zone: UTC+01:00 (CET)
  - Summer (DST): UTC+02:00 (CEST)
- INSEE/Postal code: 65145 /65120
- ^{1} French Land Register data, which excludes lakes, ponds, glaciers > 1 km^{2} (0.386 sq mi or 247 acres) and river estuaries.

Chèze (French pronunciation: [ʃɛz]; Occitan: Shèsa) is a commune in the Hautes-Pyrénées department in south-western France.

== See also ==
- Communes of the Hautes-Pyrénées department
