= Salles, Hautes-Pyrénées =

Salles
- Commune
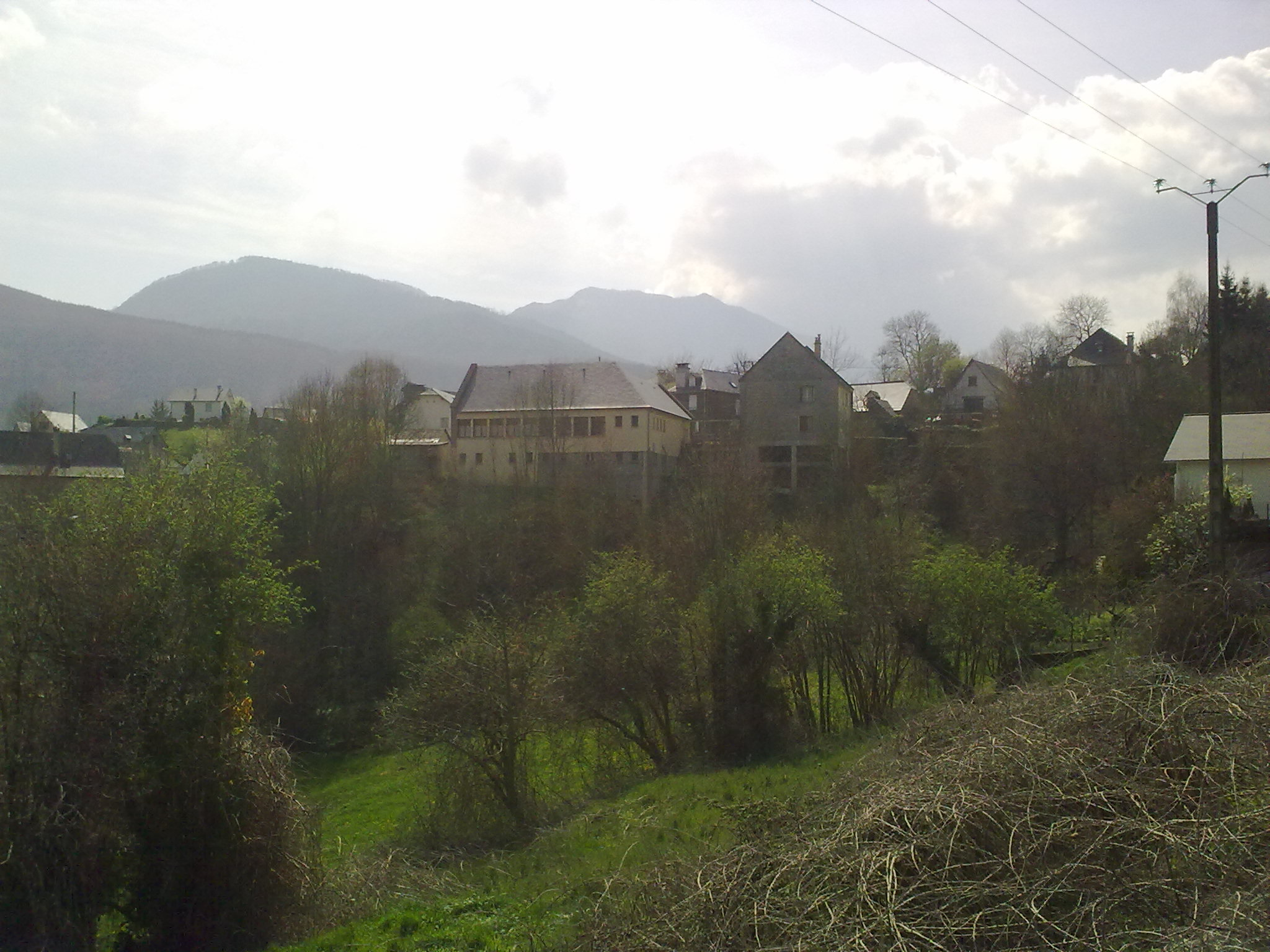
- A general view of Salles

- Coat of arms
- Location of Salles
- Location within France Location within Occitanie
- Coordinates: 43°01′45″N 0°07′09″W
- Country: France
- Region: Occitania
- Department: Hautes-Pyrénées
- Arrondissement: Argelès-Gazost
- Canton: La Vallée des Gaves
- Intercommunality: Pyrénées Vallées des Gaves

Government
  - Mayor (2020–2026): Mathieu Cuel
- Area^{1}: 27.48 km^{2} (10.61 sq mi)
- Elevation: 700 m (2,300 ft)
- Highest elevation: 1,881 m (6,171 ft)
- Lowest elevation: 517 m (1,696 ft)
- Population (2023): 258
  - Density: 9.39/km^{2} (24.3/sq mi)
- Time zone: UTC+01:00 (CET)
  - Summer (DST): UTC+02:00 (CEST)
- INSEE/Postal code: 65400 /65400
- ^{1} French Land Register data, which excludes lakes, ponds, glaciers > 1 km^{2} (0.386 sq mi or 247 acres) and river estuaries.

Salles (French pronunciation: [sal]; Occitan: Salas) is a commune in the Hautes-Pyrénées department in south-western France.

== See also ==
- Communes of the Hautes-Pyrénées department
