= Esquièze-Sère =

- Commune
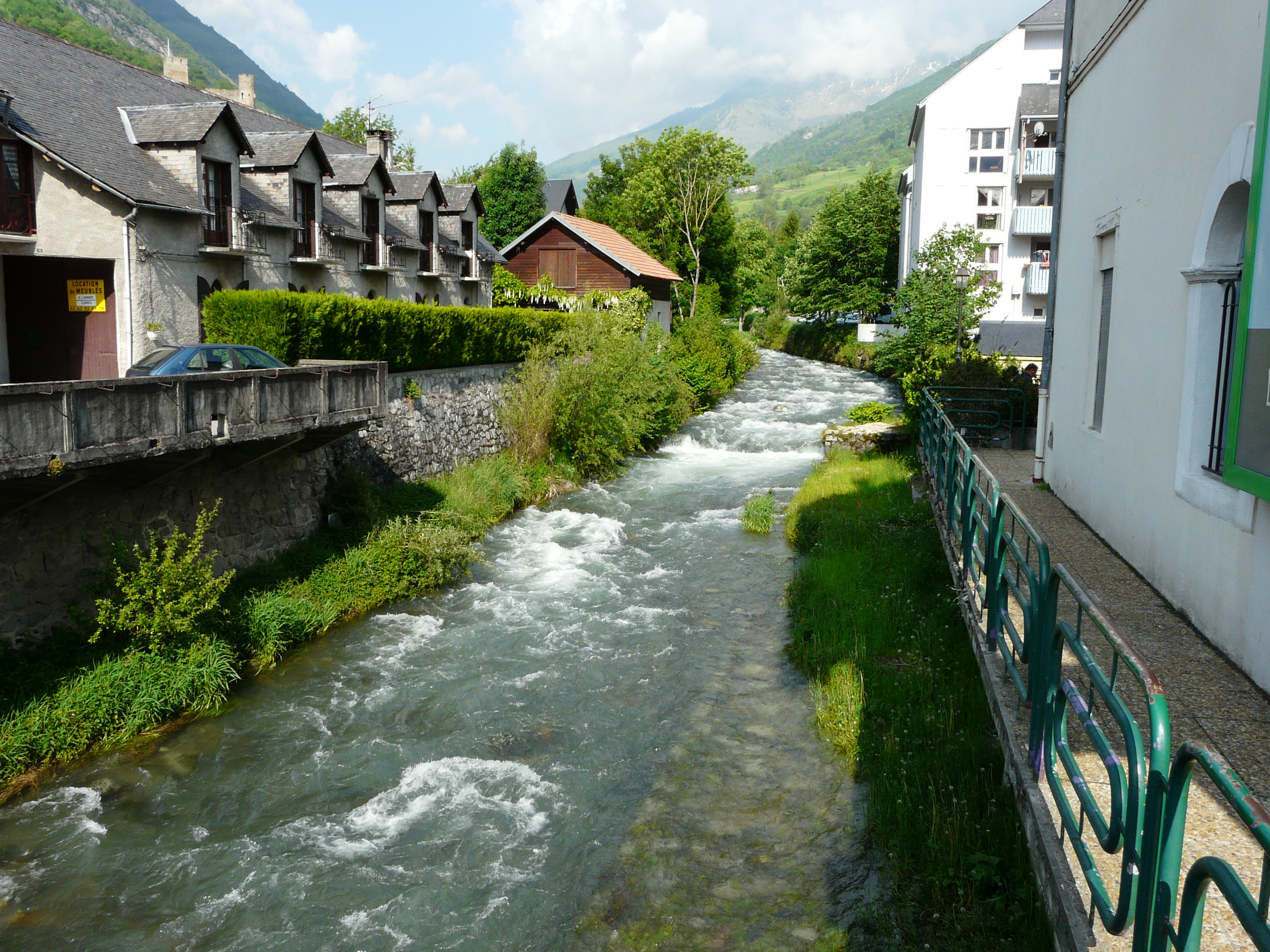
- The Bastan river between Esquièze-Sère (left) and Luz-Saint-Sauveur

- Coat of arms
- Location of Esquièze-Sère
- Location within France Location within Occitanie
- Coordinates: 42°52′36″N 0°00′02″W
- Country: France
- Region: Occitania
- Department: Hautes-Pyrénées
- Arrondissement: Argelès-Gazost
- Canton: La Vallée des Gaves

Government
  - Mayor (2020–2026): Patrice Vuillaume
- Area^{1}: 1.52 km^{2} (0.59 sq mi)
- Elevation: 700 m (2,300 ft)
- Highest elevation: 1,126 m (3,694 ft)
- Lowest elevation: 659 m (2,162 ft)
- Population (2023): 412
  - Density: 271/km^{2} (702/sq mi)
- Time zone: UTC+01:00 (CET)
  - Summer (DST): UTC+02:00 (CEST)
- INSEE/Postal code: 65168 /65120
- ^{1} French Land Register data, which excludes lakes, ponds, glaciers > 1 km^{2} (0.386 sq mi or 247 acres) and river estuaries.

Esquièze-Sère (French pronunciation: [ɛskjɛz sɛʁ]; Occitan: Esquiesa e Cèra) is a commune in the Hautes-Pyrénées department in south-western France.

== See also ==
- Communes of the Hautes-Pyrénées department
