= Ouzous =

- Commune
- Coat of arms
- Location of Ouzous
- Location within France Location within Occitanie
- Coordinates: 43°01′50″N 0°06′21″W
- Country: France
- Region: Occitania
- Department: Hautes-Pyrénées
- Arrondissement: Argelès-Gazost
- Canton: La Vallée des Gaves
- Intercommunality: Pyrénées Vallées des Gaves

Government
  - Mayor (2020–2026): Dominique Gosset
- Area^{1}: 4.76 km^{2} (1.84 sq mi)
- Elevation: 550 m (1,800 ft)
- Highest elevation: 1,419 m (4,656 ft)
- Lowest elevation: 466 m (1,529 ft)
- Population (2023): 199
  - Density: 41.8/km^{2} (108/sq mi)
- Time zone: UTC+01:00 (CET)
  - Summer (DST): UTC+02:00 (CEST)
- INSEE/Postal code: 65352 /65400
- ^{1} French Land Register data, which excludes lakes, ponds, glaciers > 1 km^{2} (0.386 sq mi or 247 acres) and river estuaries.

Ouzous is a commune in the Hautes-Pyrénées department in south-western France.

== See also ==
- Communes of the Hautes-Pyrénées department
