= Gez, Hautes-Pyrénées =

Gez
- Commune
- Coat of arms
- Location of Gez
- Location within France Location within Occitanie
- Coordinates: 43°00′48″N 0°06′36″W
- Country: France
- Region: Occitania
- Department: Hautes-Pyrénées
- Arrondissement: Argelès-Gazost
- Canton: La Vallée des Gaves
- Intercommunality: Pyrénées Vallées des Gaves
- Area^{1}: 3.89 km^{2} (1.50 sq mi)
- Elevation: 600 m (2,000 ft)
- Highest elevation: 1,004 m (3,294 ft)
- Lowest elevation: 518 m (1,699 ft)
- Population (2023): 329
  - Density: 84.6/km^{2} (219/sq mi)
- Time zone: UTC+01:00 (CET)
  - Summer (DST): UTC+02:00 (CEST)
- INSEE/Postal code: 65202 /65400
- ^{1} French Land Register data, which excludes lakes, ponds, glaciers > 1 km^{2} (0.386 sq mi or 247 acres) and river estuaries.

Gez is a commune in the Hautes-Pyrénées department in south-western France.

== See also ==
- Communes of the Hautes-Pyrénées department
