= Villelongue =

- Commune
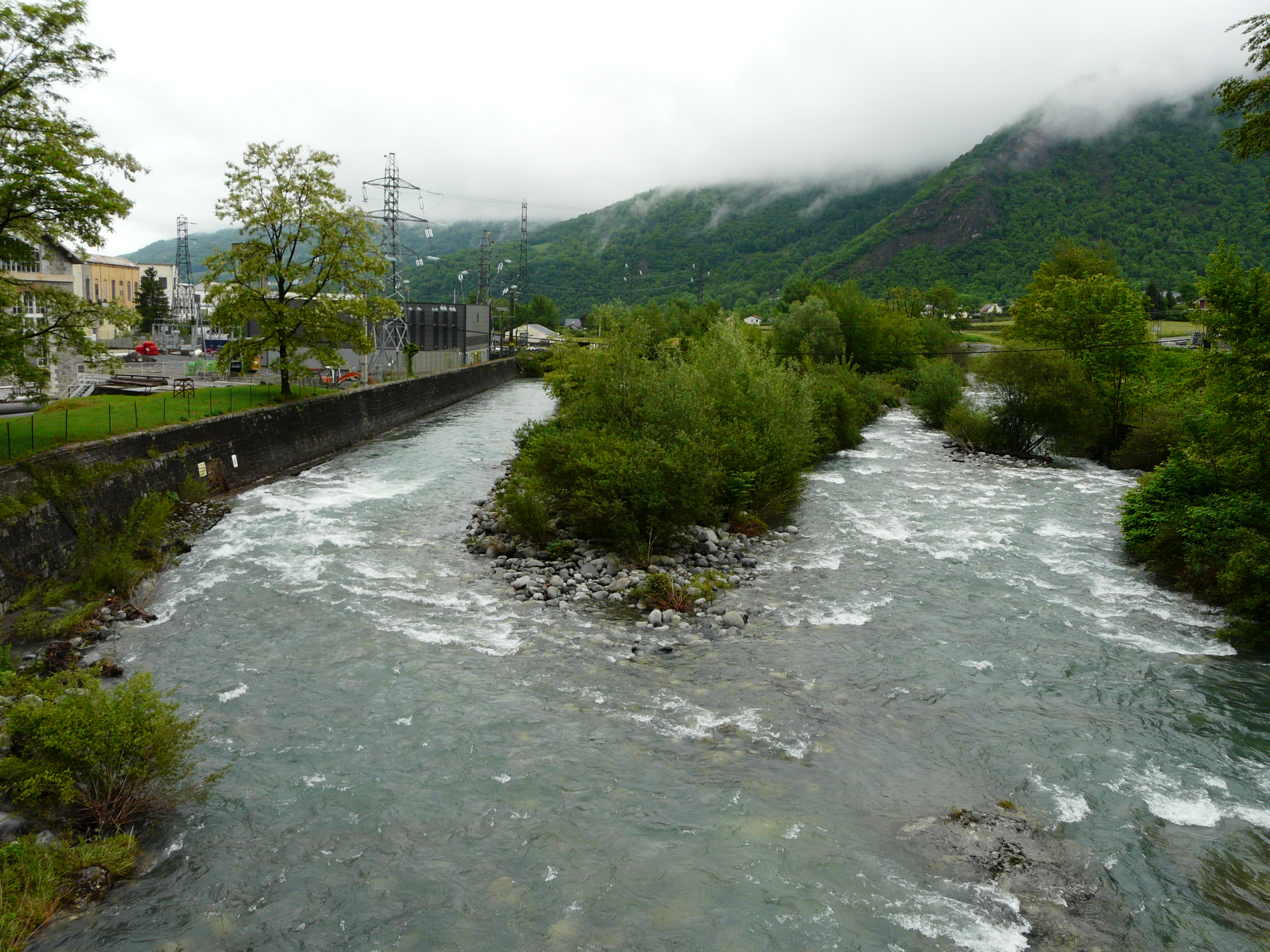
- Viewed from the bridge of the D921 road, the Gave de Gavarnie marks the boundary between Soulom hydroelectric power station to the left and centre, and Villelongue on the right

- Coat of arms
- Location of Villelongue
- Location within France Location within Occitanie
- Coordinates: 42°57′19″N 0°03′25″W
- Country: France
- Region: Occitania
- Department: Hautes-Pyrénées
- Arrondissement: Argelès-Gazost
- Canton: La Vallée des Gaves
- Intercommunality: Pyrénées Vallées des Gaves

Government
  - Mayor (2020–2026): Pierre Tramont
- Area^{1}: 20.46 km^{2} (7.90 sq mi)
- Elevation: 500 m (1,600 ft)
- Highest elevation: 2,484 m (8,150 ft)
- Lowest elevation: 457 m (1,499 ft)
- Population (2023): 347
  - Density: 17.0/km^{2} (43.9/sq mi)
- Time zone: UTC+01:00 (CET)
  - Summer (DST): UTC+02:00 (CEST)
- INSEE/Postal code: 65473 /65260
- ^{1} French Land Register data, which excludes lakes, ponds, glaciers > 1 km^{2} (0.386 sq mi or 247 acres) and river estuaries.

Villelongue (French pronunciation: [vil.lɔ̃ɡ]; Occitan: Vilalonca) is a commune in the Hautes-Pyrénées department in south-western France.

Villelongue is situated on the flank of the Hautacam mountain, around a stream called the Ruisseau d'Isaby, and descends to the Gave de Gavarnie torrent.

It consists of a main village with a smaller hamlet above called Ortiac. Ortiac has a medieval chapel. The woods above Ortiac conceal the Abbey of Saint-Orens, now in ruins.

Villelongue has considerably expanded in recent years, as new tracts are open to development and as the road infrastructure have developed to allow inhabitants to commute to Lourdes and Tarbes.

Villelongue is unusual among local towns in having a latinate name, rather than a name deriving from Bigourdan (the local dialect of the Occitan language). The name is said to derive from a Latin villa (i.e. a large farm) dating from late antiquity, situated in the lower part of the modern village, in an area known as "Las Longas".

== See also ==
- Communes of the Hautes-Pyrénées department
