= Sers, Hautes-Pyrénées =

Commune in France

Sers
- Commune
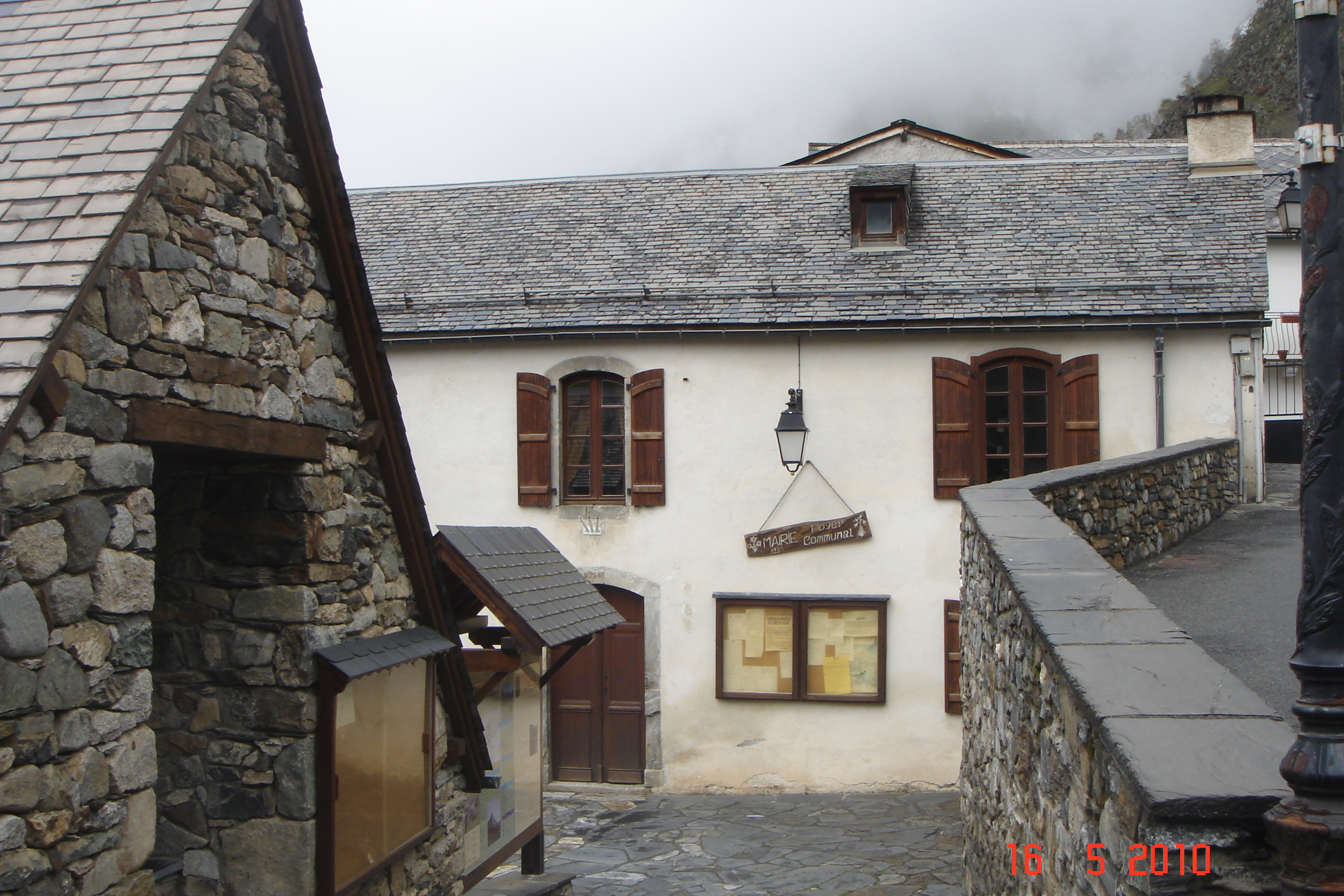
- The town hall

- Coat of arms
- Location of Sers
- Location within France Location within Occitanie
- Coordinates: 42°53′17″N 0°02′21″E
- Country: France
- Region: Occitania
- Department: Hautes-Pyrénées
- Arrondissement: Argelès-Gazost
- Canton: La Vallée des Gaves
- Area^{1}: 29.91 km^{2} (11.55 sq mi)
- Elevation: 1,100 m (3,600 ft)
- Highest elevation: 2,872 m (9,423 ft)
- Lowest elevation: 928 m (3,045 ft)
- Population (2023): 104
  - Density: 3.48/km^{2} (9.01/sq mi)
- Time zone: UTC+01:00 (CET)
  - Summer (DST): UTC+02:00 (CEST)
- INSEE/Postal code: 65424 /65120
- ^{1} French Land Register data, which excludes lakes, ponds, glaciers > 1 km^{2} (0.386 sq mi or 247 acres) and river estuaries.

Sers (Occitan: Utiliza) is a commune in the Hautes-Pyrénées department in south-western France.

== See also ==
- Communes of the Hautes-Pyrénées department

== Gallery ==
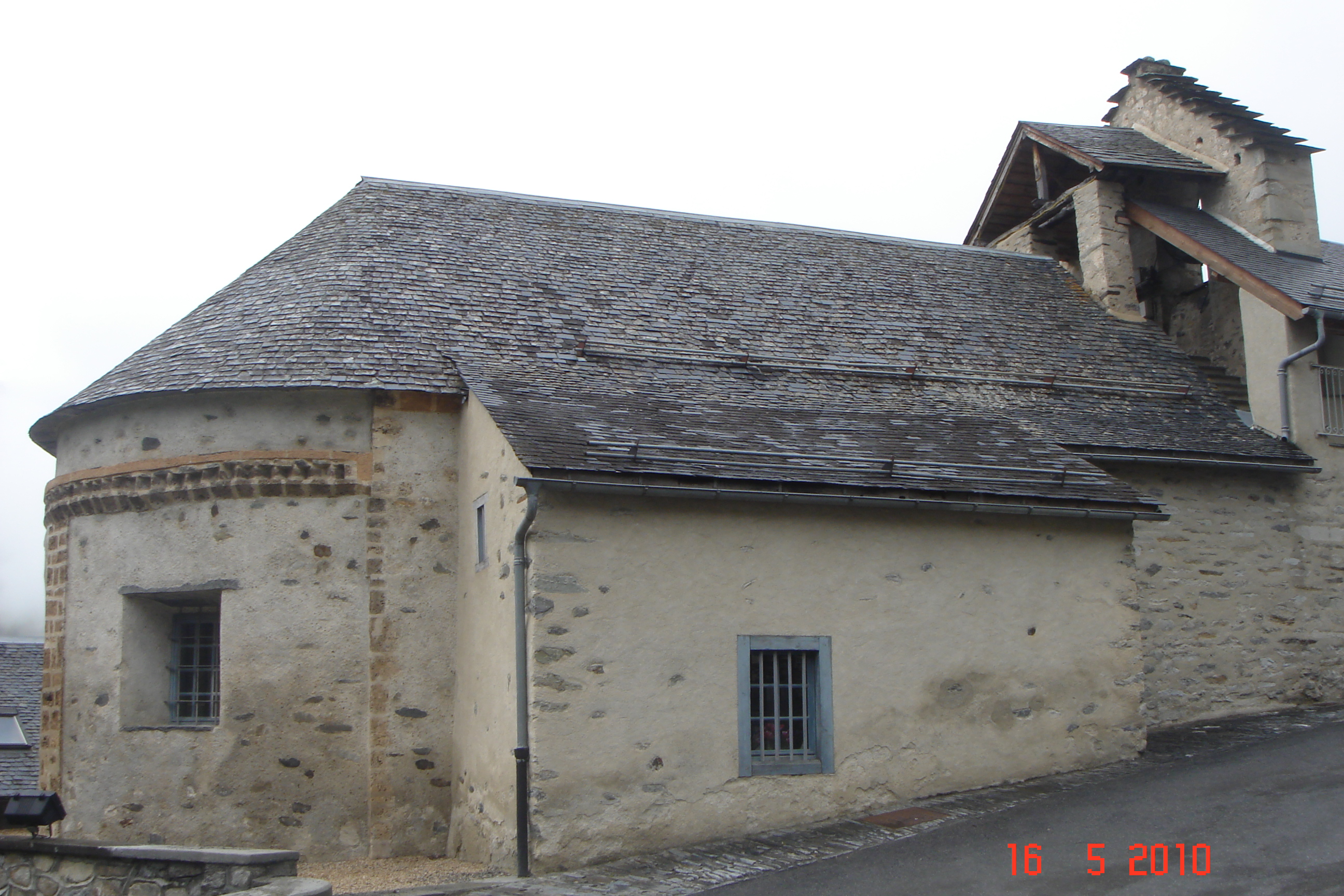
église Saint-Vincent

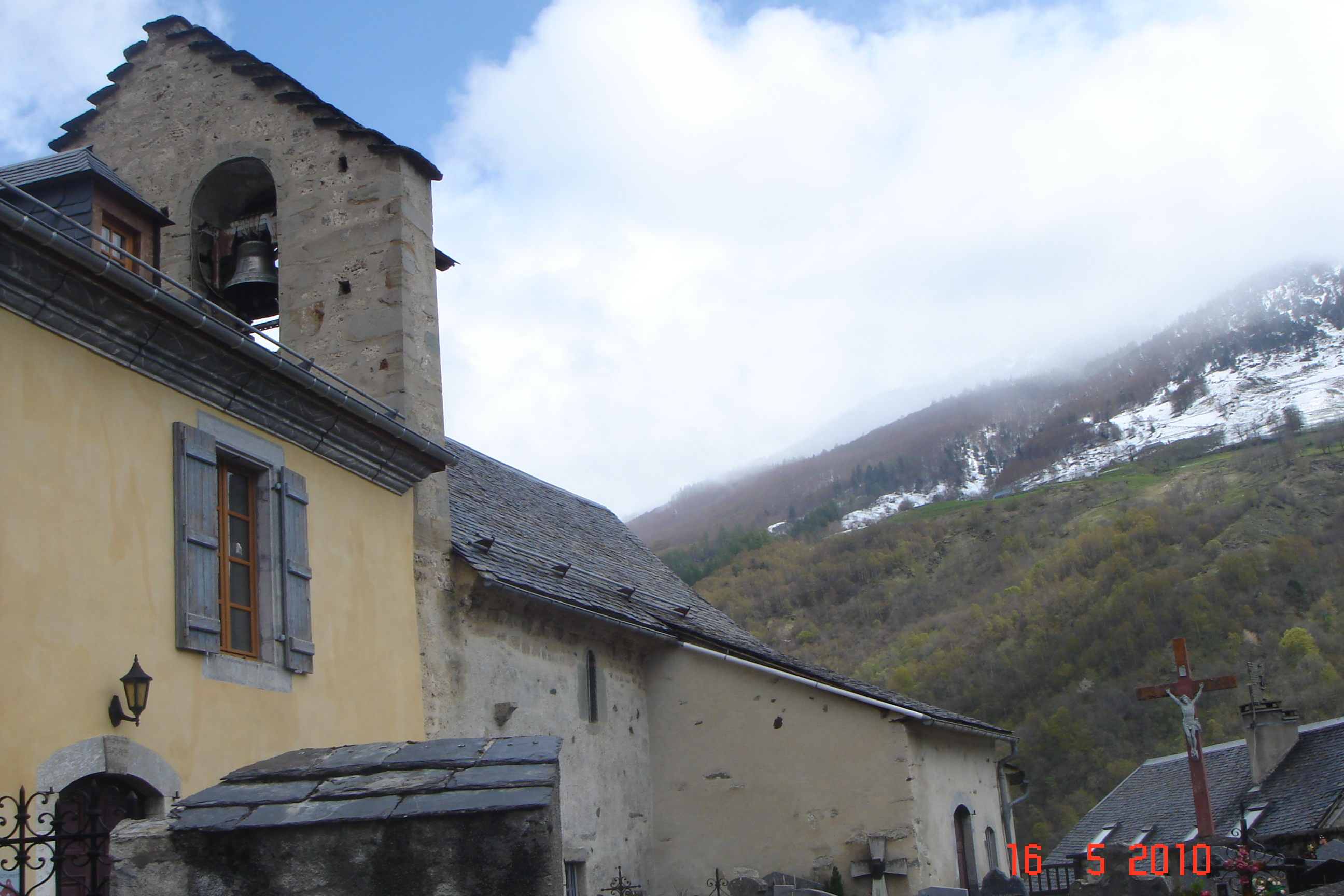

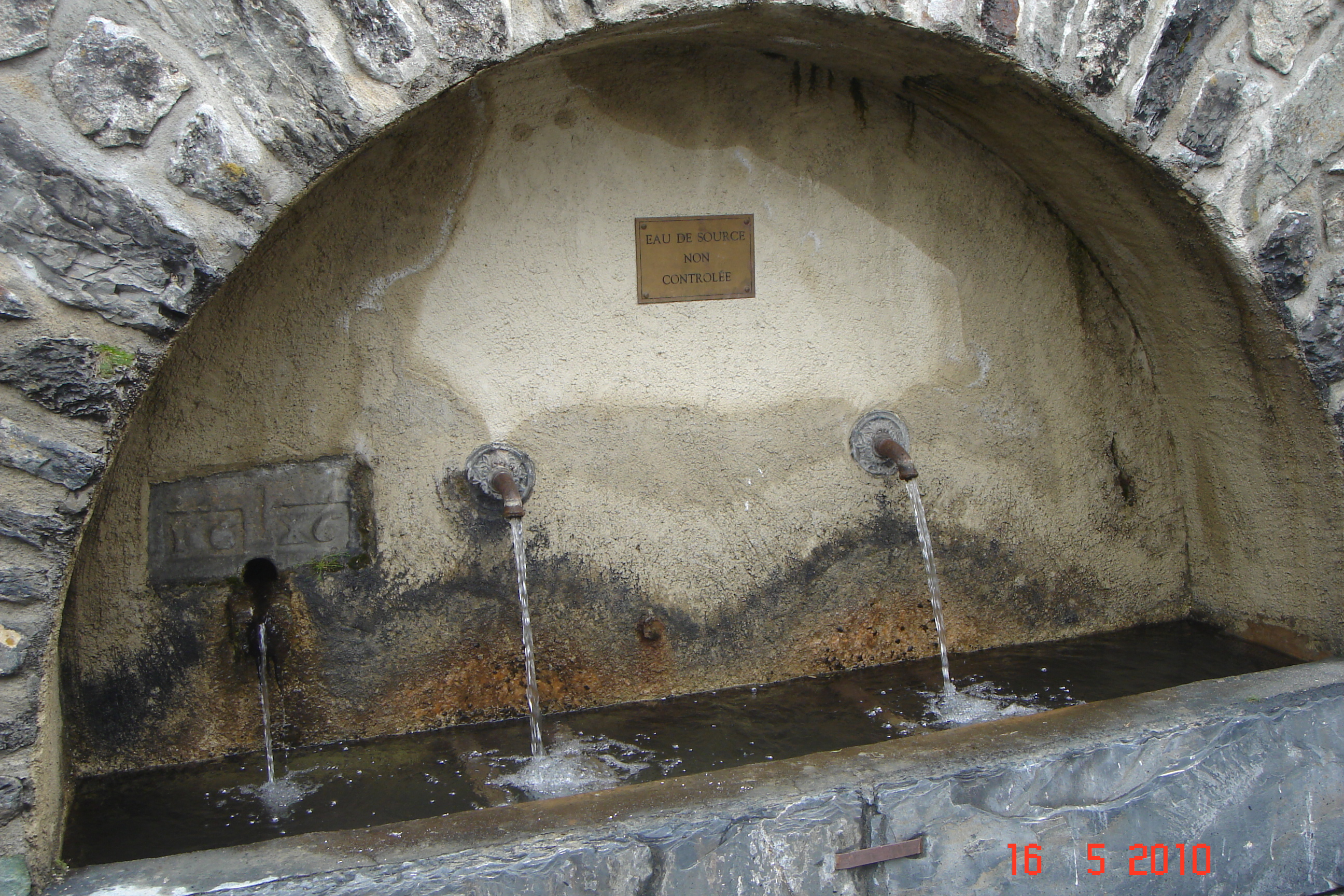
Fontaine 1616

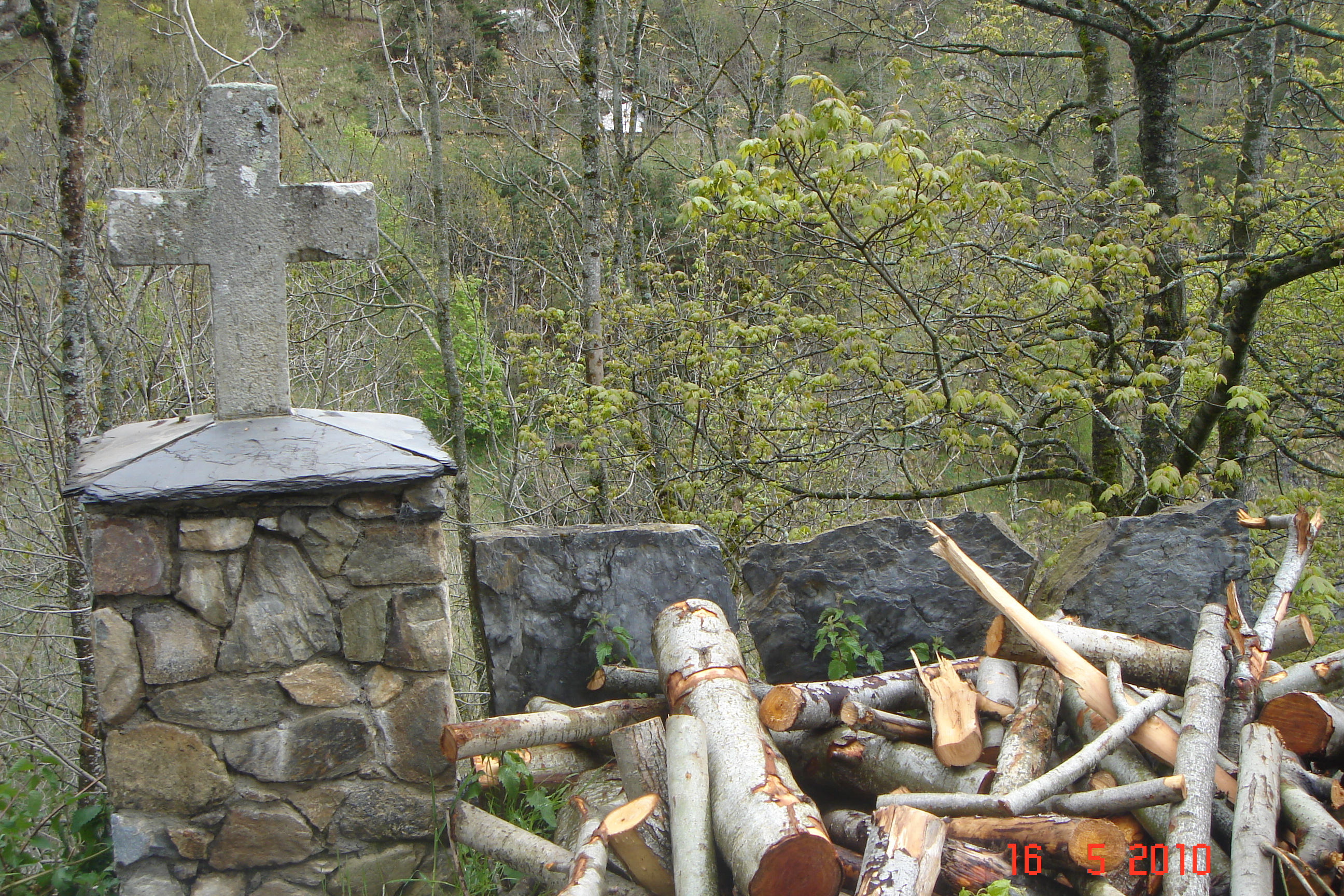
Croix

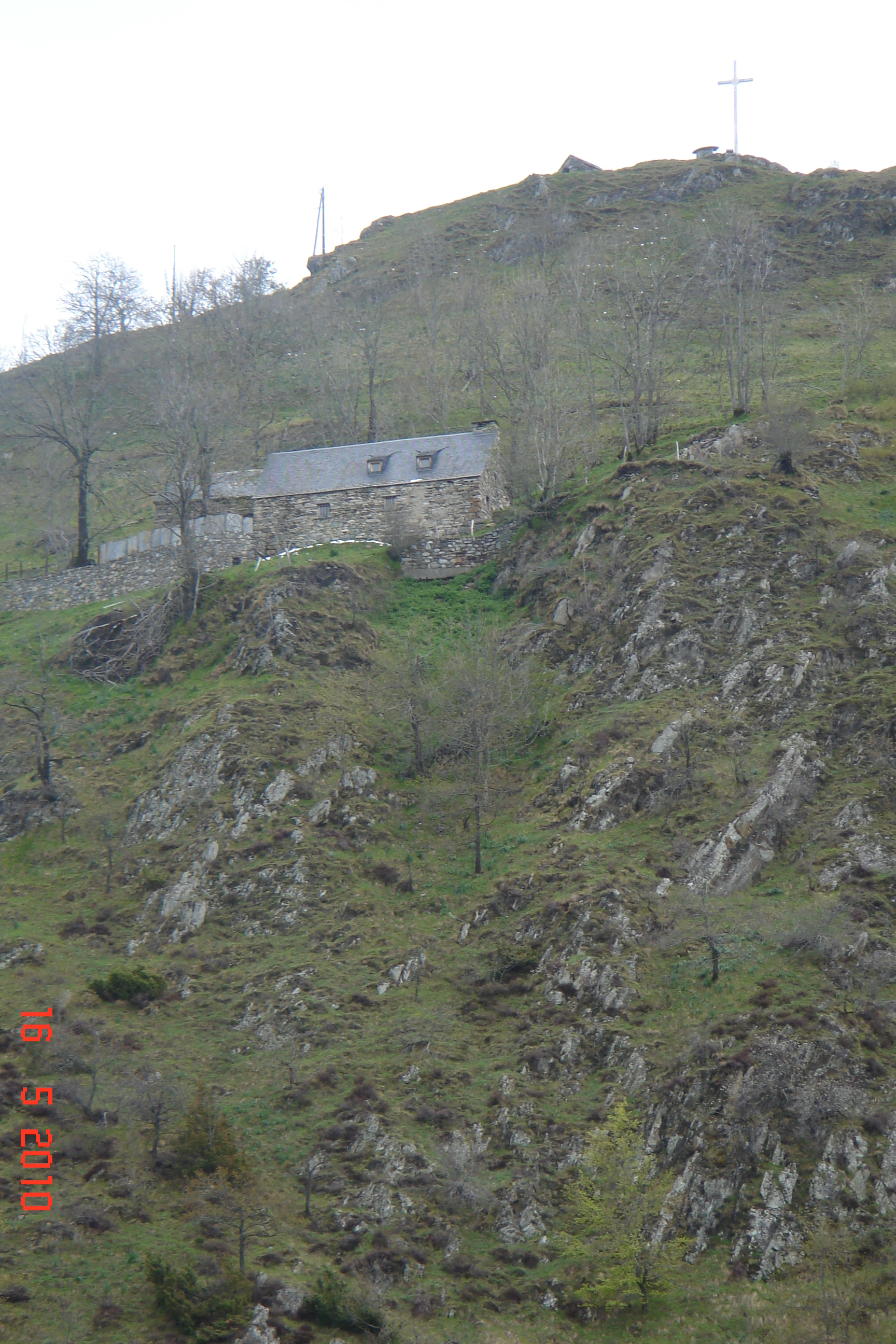
Croix Saint-Justin

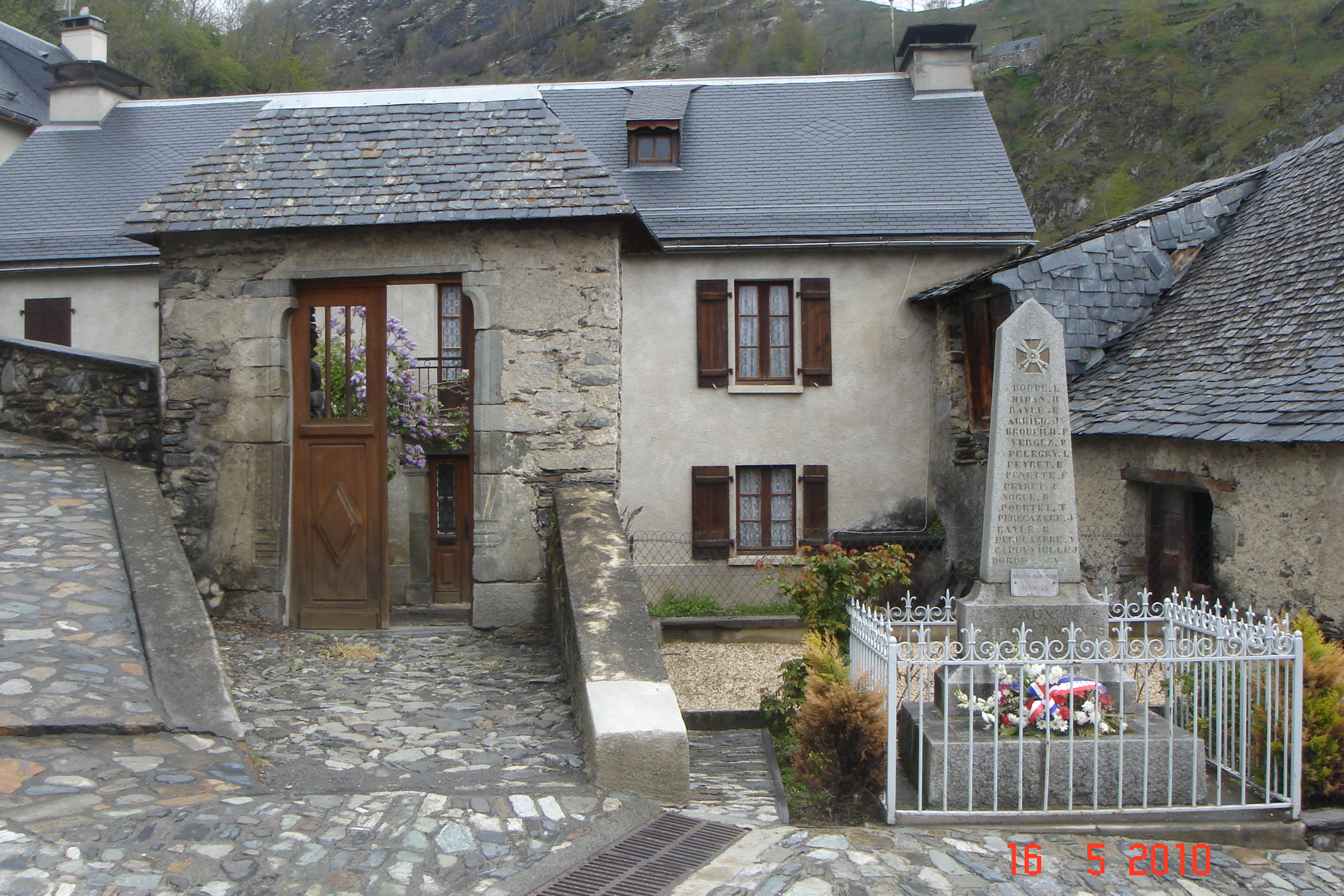
Monument aux morts

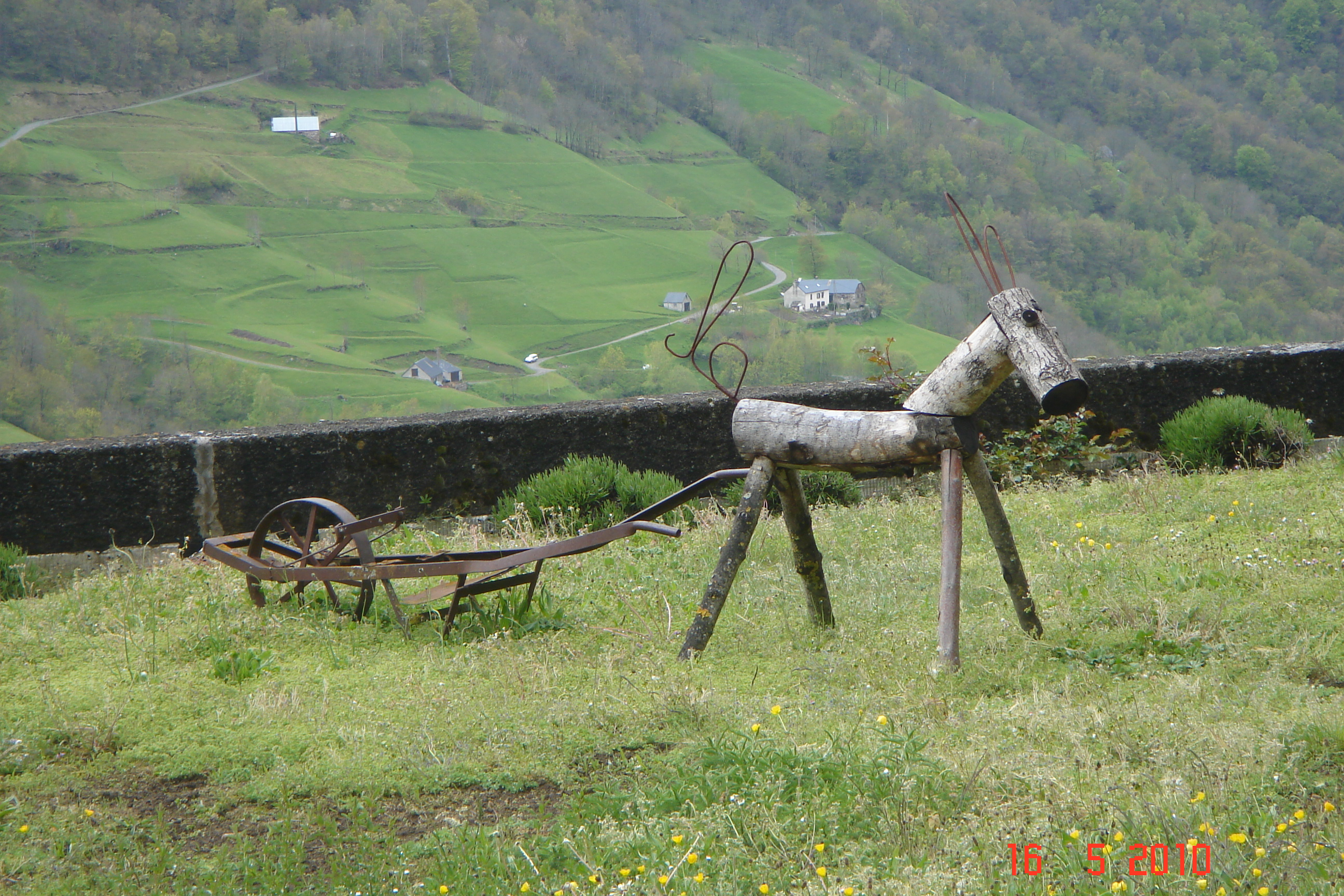
L'animal laboureur

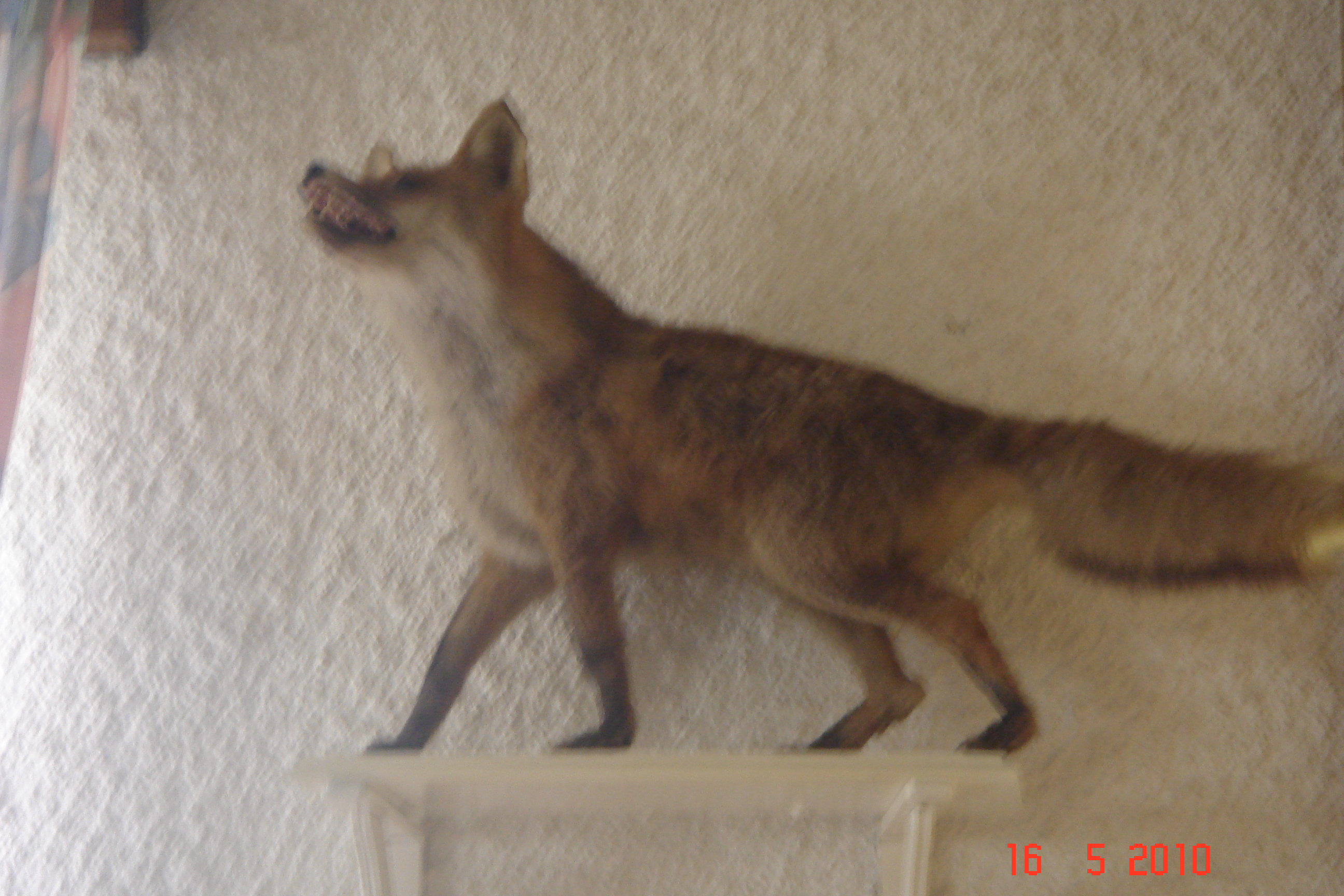
Le renard de Rozette
