= Artalens-Souin =

- Commune
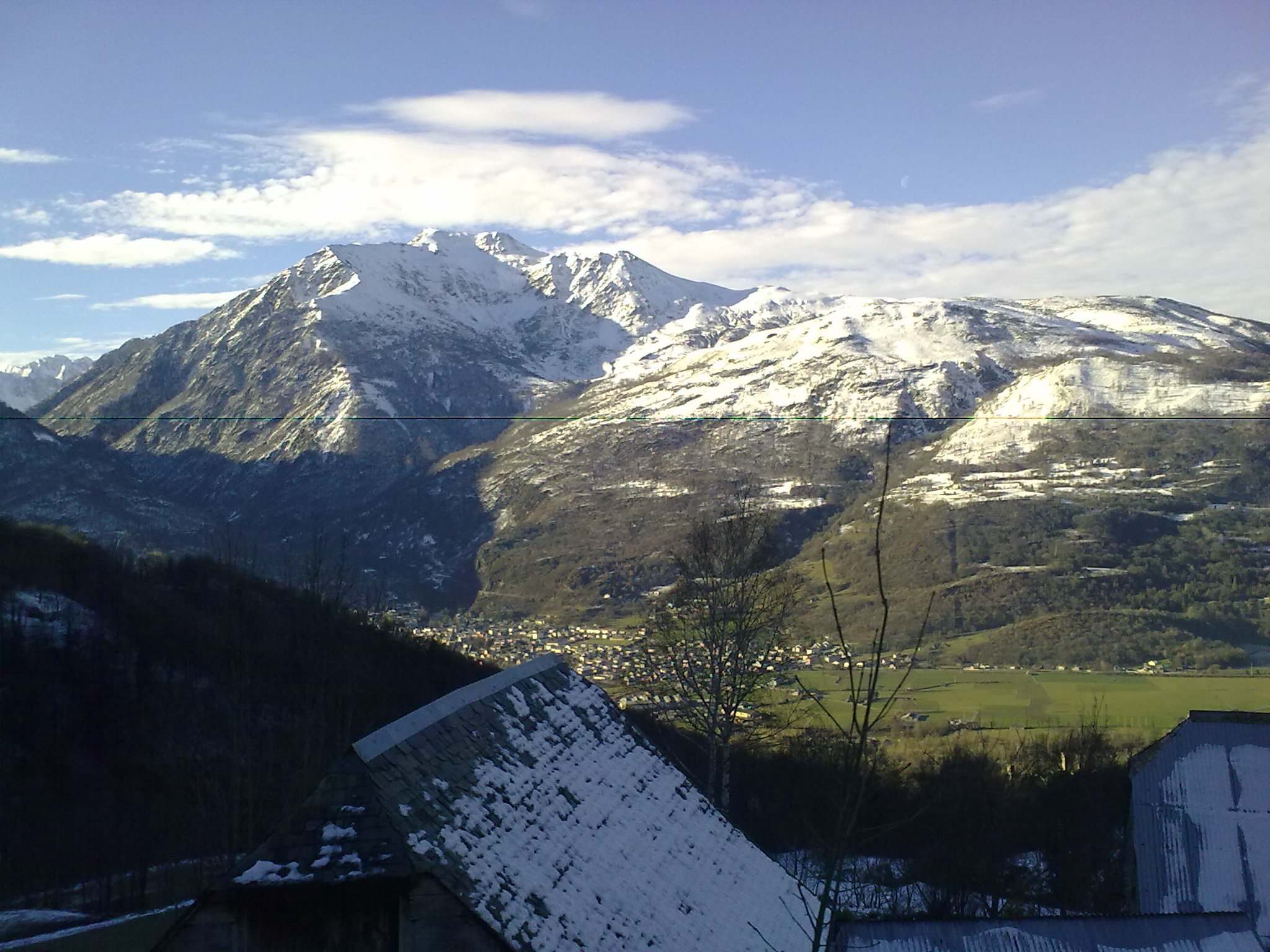
- A view of the mountains, from Artalens

- Coat of arms
- Location of Artalens-Souin
- Location within France Location within Occitanie
- Coordinates: 42°58′33″N 0°02′45″W
- Country: France
- Region: Occitania
- Department: Hautes-Pyrénées
- Arrondissement: Argelès-Gazost
- Canton: La Vallée des Gaves
- Intercommunality: CC Pyrénées Vallées des Gaves

Government
  - Mayor (2020–2026): Andrée Dulout-Gleize
- Area^{1}: 3.9 km^{2} (1.5 sq mi)
- Elevation: 186 m (610 ft)
- Highest elevation: 1,350 m (4,430 ft)
- Lowest elevation: 634 m (2,080 ft)
- Population (2023): 140
  - Density: 36/km^{2} (93/sq mi)
- Time zone: UTC+01:00 (CET)
  - Summer (DST): UTC+02:00 (CEST)
- INSEE/Postal code: 65036 /65400
- ^{1} French Land Register data, which excludes lakes, ponds, glaciers > 1 km^{2} (0.386 sq mi or 247 acres) and river estuaries.

Artalens-Souin is a commune in the Hautes-Pyrénées department in southwestern France.

== Population ==
Historical population
Year	Pop.	±% p.a.
1968	135	—
1975	122	−1.44%
1982	115	−0.84%
1990	120	+0.53%
1999	110	−0.96%
2007	108	−0.23%
2012	125	+2.97%
2017	133	+1.25%
2023	140	+0.86%
Source: INSEE

== See also ==
- Communes of the Hautes-Pyrénées department
