= Viey =

- Commune
- Coat of arms
- Location of Viey
- Location within France Location within Occitanie
- Coordinates: 42°52′59″N 0°01′27″E
- Country: France
- Region: Occitania
- Department: Hautes-Pyrénées
- Arrondissement: Argelès-Gazost
- Canton: La Vallée des Gaves

Government
  - Mayor (2020–2026): Jean-Pierre Prat
- Area^{1}: 6.24 km^{2} (2.41 sq mi)
- Elevation: 800 m (2,600 ft)
- Highest elevation: 2,390 m (7,840 ft)
- Lowest elevation: 787 m (2,582 ft)
- Population (2023): 17
  - Density: 2.7/km^{2} (7.1/sq mi)
- Time zone: UTC+01:00 (CET)
  - Summer (DST): UTC+02:00 (CEST)
- INSEE/Postal code: 65469 /65120
- ^{1} French Land Register data, which excludes lakes, ponds, glaciers > 1 km^{2} (0.386 sq mi or 247 acres) and river estuaries.

Viey (Occitan: Vieu) is a commune in the Hautes-Pyrénées department in south-western France.

== See also ==
- Communes of the Hautes-Pyrénées department
