= Boô-Silhen =

- Commune
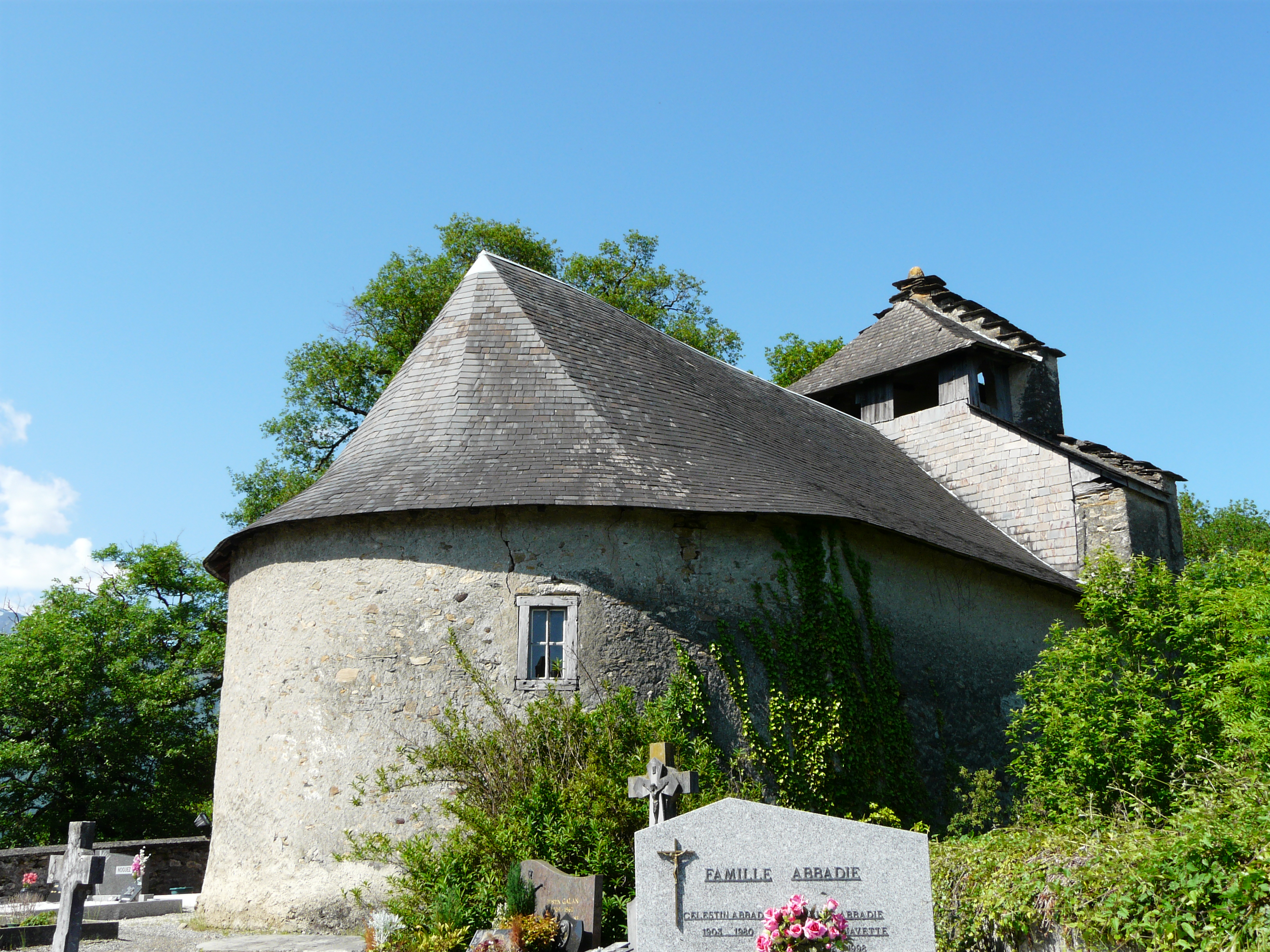
- Church of St. Vincent

- Coat of arms
- Location of Boô-Silhen
- Location within France Location within Occitanie
- Coordinates: 43°01′10″N 0°04′19″W
- Country: France
- Region: Occitania
- Department: Hautes-Pyrénées
- Arrondissement: Argelès-Gazost
- Canton: La Vallée des Gaves

Government
  - Mayor (2020–2026): Francis Coste
- Area^{1}: 3.12 km^{2} (1.20 sq mi)
- Elevation: 406 m (1,332 ft)
- Highest elevation: 599 m (1,965 ft)
- Lowest elevation: 399 m (1,309 ft)
- Population (2023): 312
  - Density: 100/km^{2} (259/sq mi)
- Time zone: UTC+01:00 (CET)
  - Summer (DST): UTC+02:00 (CEST)
- INSEE/Postal code: 65098 /65400
- ^{1} French Land Register data, which excludes lakes, ponds, glaciers > 1 km^{2} (0.386 sq mi or 247 acres) and river estuaries.

Boô-Silhen (French pronunciation: [bo sijɛ̃]; Occitan: Bòr e Silhen) is a commune in the Hautes-Pyrénées department in southwestern France.

== Population ==
The inhabitants of the commune are known as Boôsilheniens in French.

Historical population
Year	Pop.	±% p.a.
1968	165	—
1975	164	−0.09%
1982	275	+7.66%
1990	269	−0.28%
1999	271	+0.08%
2007	274	+0.14%
2012	270	−0.29%
2017	310	+2.80%
2023	312	+0.11%
Source: INSEE

== See also ==
- Communes of the Hautes-Pyrénées department
