= Saint-Pastous =

- Commune
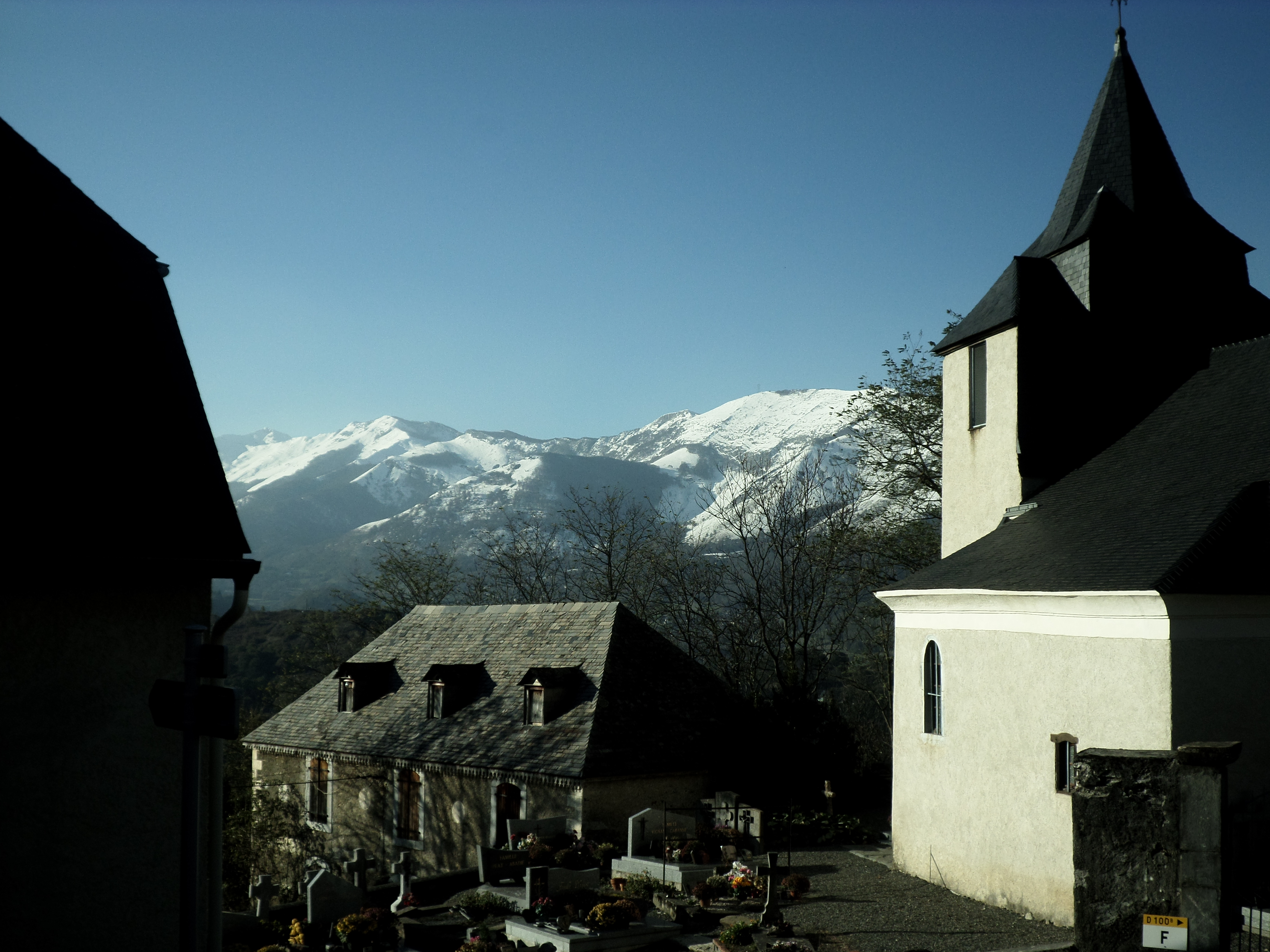
- The church of Saint-Pastous

- Coat of arms
- Location of Saint-Pastous
- Location within France Location within Occitanie
- Coordinates: 43°00′53″N 0°03′27″W
- Country: France
- Region: Occitania
- Department: Hautes-Pyrénées
- Arrondissement: Argelès-Gazost
- Canton: La Vallée des Gaves
- Intercommunality: Pyrénées Vallées des Gaves

Government
  - Mayor (2024–2026): Alexandre Aoustin
- Area^{1}: 8.2 km^{2} (3.2 sq mi)
- Elevation: 500 m (1,600 ft)
- Highest elevation: 1,661 m (5,449 ft)
- Lowest elevation: 420 m (1,380 ft)
- Population (2023): 149
  - Density: 18/km^{2} (47/sq mi)
- Time zone: UTC+01:00 (CET)
  - Summer (DST): UTC+02:00 (CEST)
- INSEE/Postal code: 65393 /65400
- ^{1} French Land Register data, which excludes lakes, ponds, glaciers > 1 km^{2} (0.386 sq mi or 247 acres) and river estuaries.

Saint-Pastous (French pronunciation: [sɛ̃ pastus]; Occitan: Sent Pastors) is a commune in the Hautes-Pyrénées department in south-western France.

== See also ==
- Communes of the Hautes-Pyrénées department
