= Bun, Hautes-Pyrénées =

Bun
- Commune
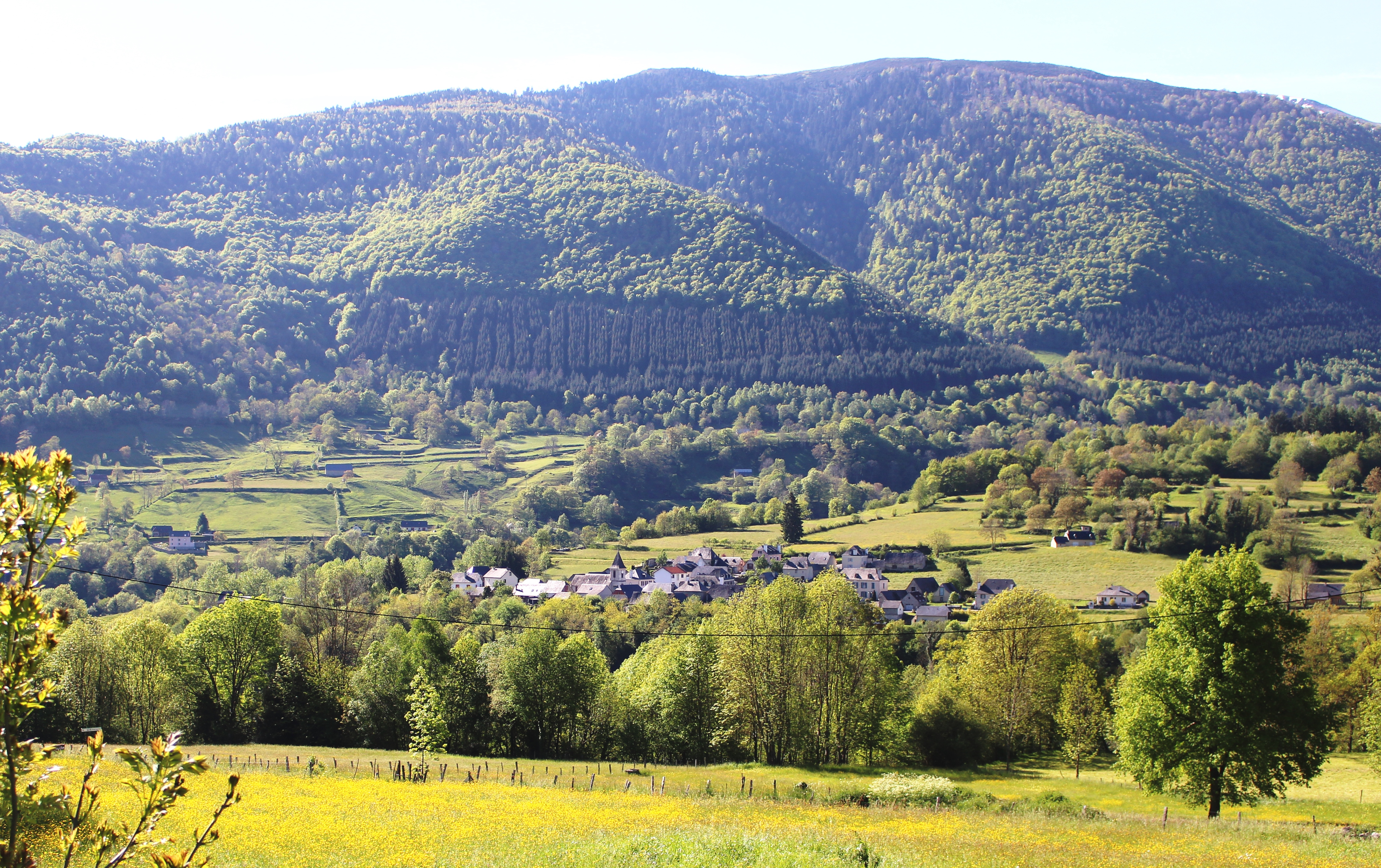
- View of Bun

- Coat of arms
- Location of Bun
- Location within France Location within Occitanie
- Coordinates: 42°58′33″N 0°09′20″W
- Country: France
- Region: Occitania
- Department: Hautes-Pyrénées
- Arrondissement: Argelès-Gazost
- Canton: La Vallée des Gaves

Government
  - Mayor (2020–2026): Bernard Peluhet
- Area^{1}: 2.8 km^{2} (1.1 sq mi)
- Elevation: 830 m (2,720 ft)
- Highest elevation: 1,345 m (4,413 ft)
- Lowest elevation: 673 m (2,208 ft)
- Population (2023): 158
  - Density: 56/km^{2} (150/sq mi)
- Time zone: UTC+01:00 (CET)
  - Summer (DST): UTC+02:00 (CEST)
- INSEE/Postal code: 65112 /65400
- ^{1} French Land Register data, which excludes lakes, ponds, glaciers > 1 km^{2} (0.386 sq mi or 247 acres) and river estuaries.

Bun (French pronunciation: [bœ̃]) is a commune in the Hautes-Pyrénées department in southwestern France.

== Population ==
Historical population
Year	Pop.	±% p.a.
1968	126	—
1975	113	−1.54%
1982	105	−1.04%
1990	101	−0.48%
1999	108	+0.75%
2007	128	+2.15%
2012	149	+3.08%
2017	146	−0.41%
2023	158	+1.33%
Source: INSEE

== See also ==
- Communes of the Hautes-Pyrénées department
