= Gaillagos =

- Commune
- Coat of arms
- Location of Gaillagos
- Location within France Location within Occitanie
- Coordinates: 42°58′57″N 0°10′29″W
- Country: France
- Region: Occitania
- Department: Hautes-Pyrénées
- Arrondissement: Argelès-Gazost
- Canton: La Vallée des Gaves
- Intercommunality: Pyrénées Vallées des Gaves

Government
  - Mayor (2020–2026): Thierry Dumestre-Courtiade
- Area^{1}: 8.46 km^{2} (3.27 sq mi)
- Elevation: 900 m (3,000 ft)
- Highest elevation: 1,617 m (5,305 ft)
- Lowest elevation: 734 m (2,408 ft)
- Population (2023): 125
  - Density: 14.8/km^{2} (38.3/sq mi)
- Time zone: UTC+01:00 (CET)
  - Summer (DST): UTC+02:00 (CEST)
- INSEE/Postal code: 65182 /65400
- ^{1} French Land Register data, which excludes lakes, ponds, glaciers > 1 km^{2} (0.386 sq mi or 247 acres) and river estuaries.

Gaillagos (French pronunciation: [ɡajaɡɔs]; Occitan: Galhagòs) is a commune in the Hautes-Pyrénées department in south-western France.

== See also ==
- Communes of the Hautes-Pyrénées department
