= Arcizans-Avant =

- Commune
- Coat of arms
- Location of Arcizans-Avant
- Location within France Location within Occitanie
- Coordinates: 42°59′19″N 0°06′18″W
- Country: France
- Region: Occitania
- Department: Hautes-Pyrénées
- Arrondissement: Argelès-Gazost
- Canton: La Vallée des Gaves

Government
  - Mayor (2020–2026): André Vergé
- Area^{1}: 15.04 km^{2} (5.81 sq mi)
- Elevation: 640 m (2,100 ft)
- Highest elevation: 2,332 m (7,651 ft)
- Lowest elevation: 480 m (1,570 ft)
- Population (2023): 397
  - Density: 26.4/km^{2} (68.4/sq mi)
- Time zone: UTC+01:00 (CET)
  - Summer (DST): UTC+02:00 (CEST)
- INSEE/Postal code: 65021 /65400
- ^{1} French Land Register data, which excludes lakes, ponds, glaciers > 1 km^{2} (0.386 sq mi or 247 acres) and river estuaries.

Arcizans-Avant (Occitan: Arcisans Avant) is a commune in the Hautes-Pyrénées department in southwestern France.

== Population ==
Historical population
Year	Pop.	±% p.a.
1968	185	—
1975	192	+0.53%
1982	200	+0.58%
1990	258	+3.23%
1999	298	+1.61%
2007	355	+2.21%
2012	375	+1.10%
2017	394	+0.99%
2023	397	+0.13%
Source: INSEE

== See also ==
- Communes of the Hautes-Pyrénées department
