= Vier-Bordes =

- Commune
- Coat of arms
- Location of Vier-Bordes
- Location within France Location within Occitanie
- Coordinates: 42°59′57″N 0°03′19″W
- Country: France
- Region: Occitania
- Department: Hautes-Pyrénées
- Arrondissement: Argelès-Gazost
- Canton: La Vallée des Gaves
- Intercommunality: Pyrénées Vallées des Gaves

Government
  - Mayor (2020–2026): Pascal Collado
- Area^{1}: 9.39 km^{2} (3.63 sq mi)
- Elevation: 84 m (276 ft)
- Highest elevation: 1,709 m (5,607 ft)
- Lowest elevation: 640 m (2,100 ft)
- Population (2023): 96
  - Density: 10/km^{2} (26/sq mi)
- Time zone: UTC+01:00 (CET)
  - Summer (DST): UTC+02:00 (CEST)
- INSEE/Postal code: 65467 /65400
- ^{1} French Land Register data, which excludes lakes, ponds, glaciers > 1 km^{2} (0.386 sq mi or 247 acres) and river estuaries.

Vier-Bordes (French pronunciation: [vjɛʁ bɔʁd]; Occitan: Bièr e Bòrdas) is a commune in the Hautes-Pyrénées department in south-western France.

== See also ==
- Communes of the Hautes-Pyrénées department
