= Estaing, Hautes-Pyrénées =

Estaing
- Commune
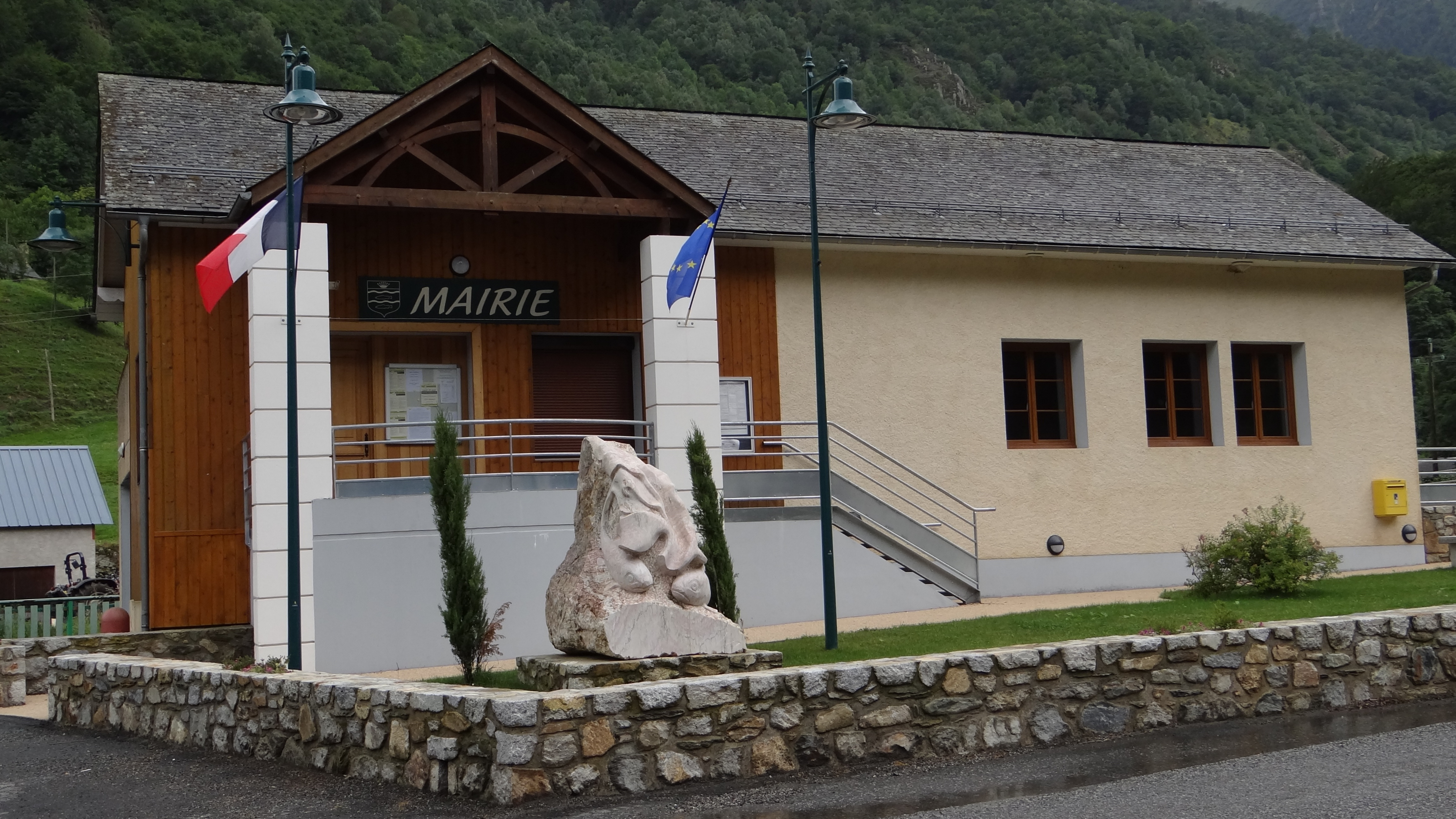
- The town hall

- Coat of arms
- Location of Estaing
- Location within France Location within Occitanie
- Coordinates: 42°56′17″N 0°10′41″W
- Country: France
- Region: Occitania
- Department: Hautes-Pyrénées
- Arrondissement: Argelès-Gazost
- Canton: La Vallée des Gaves
- Intercommunality: Pyrénées Vallées des Gaves

Government
  - Mayor (2020–2026): Marie-Luce Komeza
- Area^{1}: 71.53 km^{2} (27.62 sq mi)
- Elevation: 1,000 m (3,300 ft)
- Highest elevation: 2,960 m (9,710 ft)
- Lowest elevation: 906 m (2,972 ft)
- Population (2023): 95
  - Density: 1.3/km^{2} (3.4/sq mi)
- Time zone: UTC+01:00 (CET)
  - Summer (DST): UTC+02:00 (CEST)
- INSEE/Postal code: 65169 /65400
- ^{1} French Land Register data, which excludes lakes, ponds, glaciers > 1 km^{2} (0.386 sq mi or 247 acres) and river estuaries.

Estaing (French pronunciation: [ɛstɛ̃]; Occitan: Estanh) is a commune in the Hautes-Pyrénées department in south-western France.

== See also ==
- Communes of the Hautes-Pyrénées department
