= Canton of La Vallée des Gaves =

Canton of France

Coordinates: 43.01°N 0.10°W

The canton of La Vallée des Gaves is an administrative division of the Hautes-Pyrénées department, southwestern France. It was created at the French canton reorganisation which came into effect in March 2015. Its seat is in Argelès-Gazost.

It consists of the following communes:

1. Adast
2. Agos-Vidalos
3. Arbéost
4. Arcizans-Avant
5. Arcizans-Dessus
6. Argelès-Gazost
7. Arras-en-Lavedan
8. Arrens-Marsous
9. Artalens-Souin
10. Aucun
11. Ayros-Arbouix
12. Ayzac-Ost
13. Barèges
14. Beaucens
15. Betpouey
16. Boô-Silhen
17. Bun
18. Cauterets
19. Chèze
20. Esquièze-Sère
21. Estaing
22. Esterre
23. Ferrières
24. Gaillagos
25. Gavarnie-Gèdre
26. Gez
27. Grust
28. Lau-Balagnas
29. Luz-Saint-Sauveur
30. Ouzous
31. Pierrefitte-Nestalas
32. Préchac
33. Saint-Pastous
34. Saint-Savin
35. Saligos
36. Salles
37. Sassis
38. Sazos
39. Sère-en-Lavedan
40. Sers
41. Sireix
42. Soulom
43. Uz
44. Viella
45. Vier-Bordes
46. Viey
47. Villelongue
48. Viscos
