= Arcizans-Dessus =

- Commune
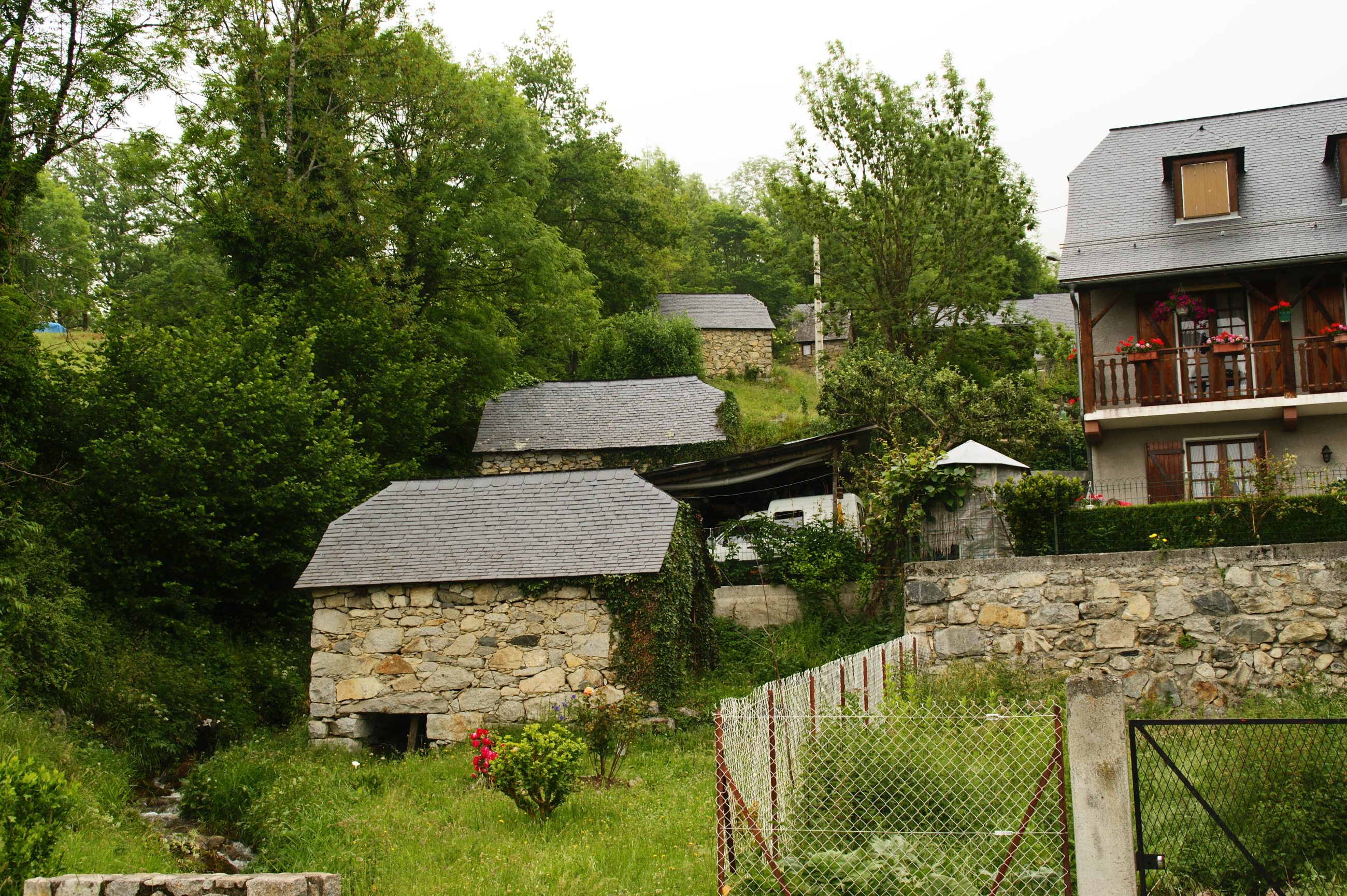
- Watermills

- Coat of arms
- Location of Arcizans-Dessus
- Location within France Location within Occitanie
- Coordinates: 42°59′03″N 0°09′32″W
- Country: France
- Region: Occitania
- Department: Hautes-Pyrénées
- Arrondissement: Argelès-Gazost
- Canton: La Vallée des Gaves
- Intercommunality: Pyrénées Vallées des Gaves

Government
  - Mayor (2022–2026): Bertrand Gerbet
- Area^{1}: 5.01 km^{2} (1.93 sq mi)
- Elevation: 788 m (2,585 ft)
- Highest elevation: 1,562 m (5,125 ft)
- Lowest elevation: 676 m (2,218 ft)
- Population (2023): 116
  - Density: 23.2/km^{2} (60.0/sq mi)
- Time zone: UTC+01:00 (CET)
  - Summer (DST): UTC+02:00 (CEST)
- INSEE/Postal code: 65022 /65400
- ^{1} French Land Register data, which excludes lakes, ponds, glaciers > 1 km^{2} (0.386 sq mi or 247 acres) and river estuaries.

Arcizans-Dessus is a commune in the Hautes-Pyrénées department in southwestern France.

== Population ==
Historical population
Year	Pop.	±% p.a.
1968	89	—
1975	88	−0.16%
1982	86	−0.33%
1990	91	+0.71%
1999	96	+0.60%
2007	106	+1.25%
2012	99	−1.36%
2017	125	+4.77%
2023	116	−1.24%
Source: INSEE

== See also ==
- Communes of the Hautes-Pyrénées department
