= Sireix =

- Commune
- Coat of arms
- Location of Sireix
- Location within France Location within Occitanie
- Coordinates: 42°58′34″N 0°08′46″W
- Country: France
- Region: Occitania
- Department: Hautes-Pyrénées
- Arrondissement: Argelès-Gazost
- Canton: La Vallée des Gaves
- Intercommunality: Pyrénées Vallées des Gaves
- Area^{1}: 1.73 km^{2} (0.67 sq mi)
- Elevation: 707 m (2,320 ft)
- Highest elevation: 1,042 m (3,419 ft)
- Lowest elevation: 668 m (2,192 ft)
- Population (2023): 60
  - Density: 35/km^{2} (90/sq mi)
- Time zone: UTC+01:00 (CET)
  - Summer (DST): UTC+02:00 (CEST)
- INSEE/Postal code: 65428 /65400
- ^{1} French Land Register data, which excludes lakes, ponds, glaciers > 1 km^{2} (0.386 sq mi or 247 acres) and river estuaries.

Sireix (Occitan: Shirèish) is a commune in the Hautes-Pyrénées department in southwestern France.

== See also ==
- Communes of the Hautes-Pyrénées department
