= Aucun =

- Commune
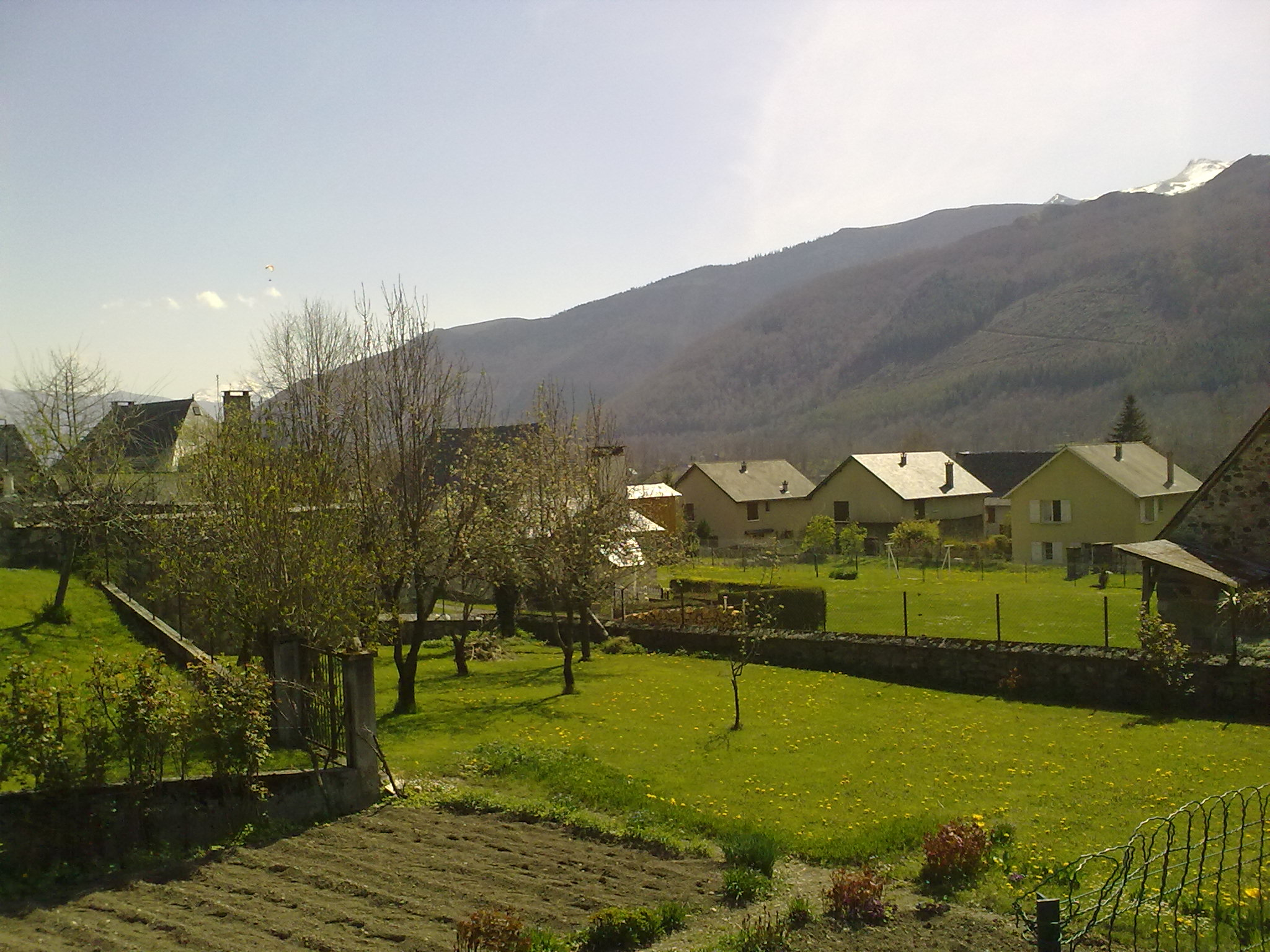
- The landscape of Aucun

- Coat of arms
- Location of Aucun
- Location within France Location within Occitanie
- Coordinates: 42°58′27″N 0°11′28″W
- Country: France
- Region: Occitania
- Department: Hautes-Pyrénées
- Arrondissement: Argelès-Gazost
- Canton: La Vallée des Gaves
- Intercommunality: Pyrénées Vallées des Gaves

Government
  - Mayor (2020–2026): Corinne Galey
- Area^{1}: 12.94 km^{2} (5.00 sq mi)
- Elevation: 865 m (2,838 ft)
- Highest elevation: 1,804 m (5,919 ft)
- Lowest elevation: 800 m (2,600 ft)
- Population (2023): 267
  - Density: 20.6/km^{2} (53.4/sq mi)
- Time zone: UTC+01:00 (CET)
  - Summer (DST): UTC+02:00 (CEST)
- INSEE/Postal code: 65045 /65400
- ^{1} French Land Register data, which excludes lakes, ponds, glaciers > 1 km^{2} (0.386 sq mi or 247 acres) and river estuaries.

Aucun (French pronunciation: [okœ̃]) is a commune in the Hautes-Pyrénées department in southwestern France.

It relies on tourism, mountain activities such as mountain biking and hiking and in winter Nordic skiing.

== Population ==
Historical population
Year	Pop.	±% p.a.
1968	190	—
1975	150	−3.32%
1982	170	+1.80%
1990	199	+1.99%
1999	205	+0.33%
2007	256	+2.82%
2012	256	+0.00%
2017	237	−1.53%
2023	267	+2.01%
Source: INSEE

== See also ==
- Communes of the Hautes-Pyrénées department
