= Grust =

- Commune
- Coat of arms
- Location of Grust
- Location within France Location within Occitanie
- Coordinates: 42°53′24″N 0°01′52″W
- Country: France
- Region: Occitania
- Department: Hautes-Pyrénées
- Arrondissement: Argelès-Gazost
- Canton: La Vallée des Gaves
- Area^{1}: 9.52 km^{2} (3.68 sq mi)
- Elevation: 900 m (3,000 ft)
- Highest elevation: 2,527 m (8,291 ft)
- Lowest elevation: 816 m (2,677 ft)
- Population (2023): 38
  - Density: 4.0/km^{2} (10/sq mi)
- Time zone: UTC+01:00 (CET)
  - Summer (DST): UTC+02:00 (CEST)
- INSEE/Postal code: 65210 /65120
- ^{1} French Land Register data, which excludes lakes, ponds, glaciers > 1 km^{2} (0.386 sq mi or 247 acres) and river estuaries.

Grust is a commune in the Hautes-Pyrénées department in south-western France.

== See also ==
- Communes of the Hautes-Pyrénées department
