= Sassis =

- Commune
- Coat of arms
- Location of Sassis
- Location within France Location within Occitanie
- Coordinates: 42°52′44″N 0°00′57″W
- Country: France
- Region: Occitania
- Department: Hautes-Pyrénées
- Arrondissement: Argelès-Gazost
- Canton: La Vallée des Gaves

Government
  - Mayor (2020–2026): Christine Caube
- Area^{1}: 0.5 km^{2} (0.19 sq mi)
- Elevation: 690 m (2,260 ft)
- Highest elevation: 840 m (2,760 ft)
- Lowest elevation: 658 m (2,159 ft)
- Population (2023): 69
  - Density: 140/km^{2} (360/sq mi)
- Time zone: UTC+01:00 (CET)
  - Summer (DST): UTC+02:00 (CEST)
- INSEE/Postal code: 65411 /65120
- ^{1} French Land Register data, which excludes lakes, ponds, glaciers > 1 km^{2} (0.386 sq mi or 247 acres) and river estuaries.

Sassis (French pronunciation: [sasis]; Occitan: Sassís) is a commune in the Hautes-Pyrénées department in south-western France.

== See also ==
- Communes of the Hautes-Pyrénées department
