= Viscos =

- Commune
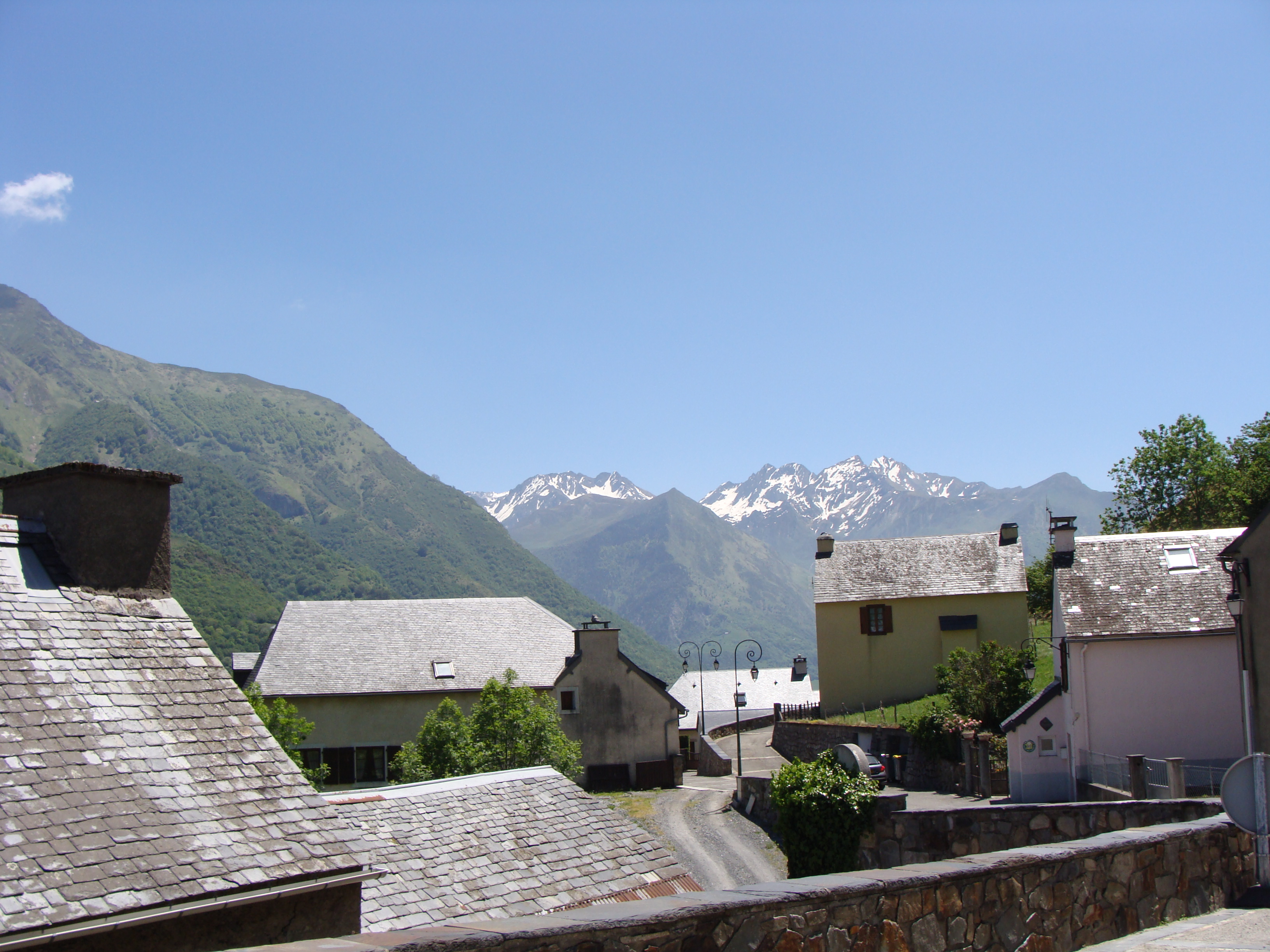
- A general view of Viscos

- Coat of arms
- Location of Viscos
- Location within France Location within Occitanie
- Coordinates: 42°54′39″N 0°02′34″W
- Country: France
- Region: Occitania
- Department: Hautes-Pyrénées
- Arrondissement: Argelès-Gazost
- Canton: La Vallée des Gaves

Government
  - Mayor (2020–2026): Guy Lonca
- Area^{1}: 6.52 km^{2} (2.52 sq mi)
- Elevation: 800 m (2,600 ft)
- Highest elevation: 2,139 m (7,018 ft)
- Lowest elevation: 520 m (1,710 ft)
- Population (2023): 35
  - Density: 5.4/km^{2} (14/sq mi)
- Time zone: UTC+01:00 (CET)
  - Summer (DST): UTC+02:00 (CEST)
- INSEE/Postal code: 65478 /65120
- ^{1} French Land Register data, which excludes lakes, ponds, glaciers > 1 km^{2} (0.386 sq mi or 247 acres) and river estuaries.

Viscos (French pronunciation: [viskɔs]; Occitan: Biscòs) is a commune in the Hautes-Pyrénées department in south-western France. It is famous for being the setting of Brazilian author Paulo Coelho's 2000 novel The Devil and Miss Prym.

== See also ==
- Communes of the Hautes-Pyrénées department
