= Esterre =

- Commune
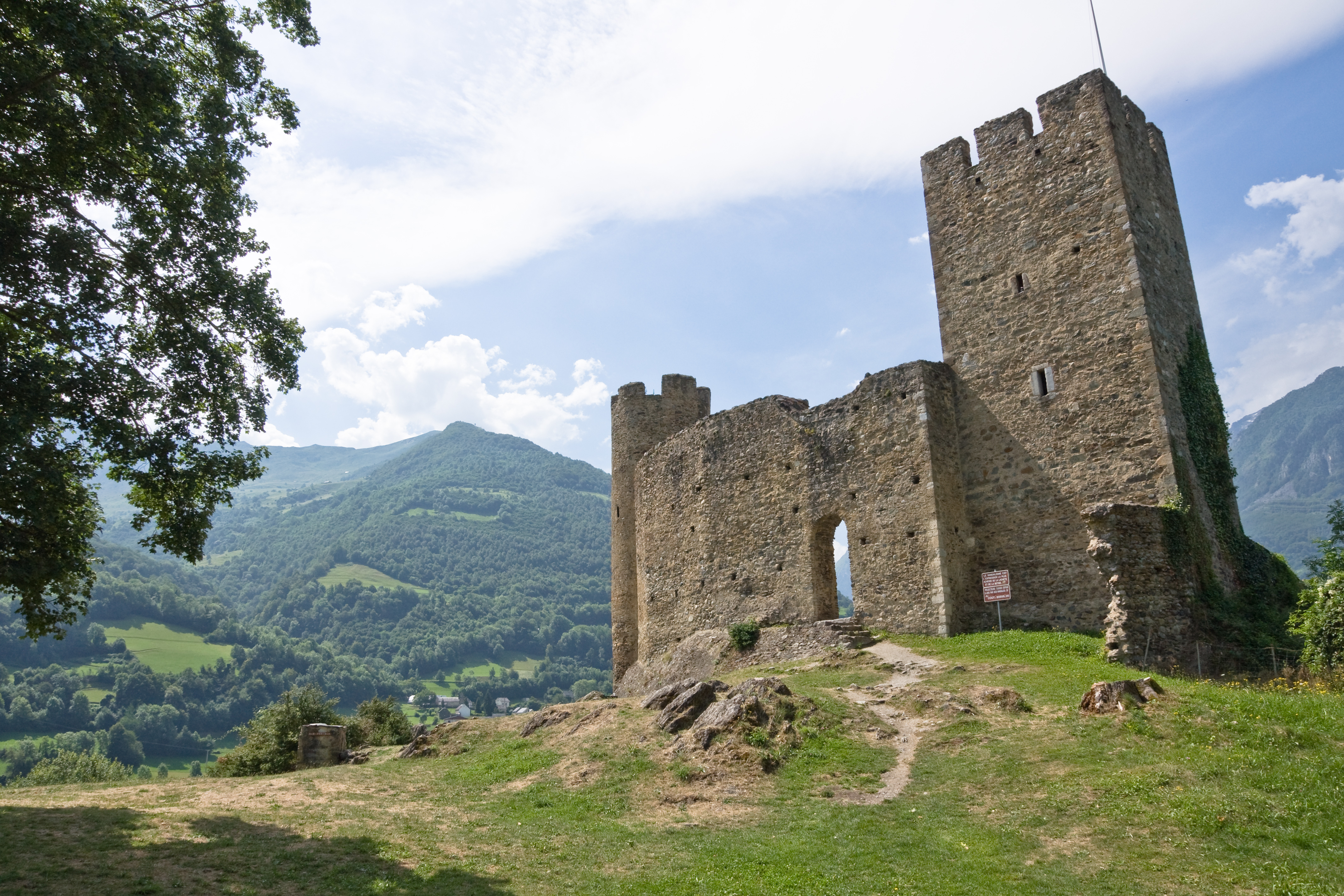
- The Château Sainte-Marie of Esterre

- Coat of arms
- Location of Esterre
- Location within France Location within Occitanie
- Coordinates: 42°52′32″N 0°00′28″E
- Country: France
- Region: Occitania
- Department: Hautes-Pyrénées
- Arrondissement: Argelès-Gazost
- Canton: La Vallée des Gaves

Government
  - Mayor (2020–2026): Raymond Theil
- Area^{1}: 1.74 km^{2} (0.67 sq mi)
- Elevation: 760 m (2,490 ft)
- Highest elevation: 1,987 m (6,519 ft)
- Lowest elevation: 720 m (2,360 ft)
- Population (2023): 184
  - Density: 106/km^{2} (274/sq mi)
- Time zone: UTC+01:00 (CET)
  - Summer (DST): UTC+02:00 (CEST)
- INSEE/Postal code: 65173 /65120
- ^{1} French Land Register data, which excludes lakes, ponds, glaciers > 1 km^{2} (0.386 sq mi or 247 acres) and river estuaries.

Esterre (French pronunciation: [ɛstɛʁ]; Occitan: Estèrra) is a commune in the Hautes-Pyrénées department in south-western France.

== See also ==
- Communes of the Hautes-Pyrénées department
