= Sazos =

- Commune
- Coat of arms
- Location of Sazos
- Location within France Location within Occitanie
- Coordinates: 42°53′05″N 0°01′27″W
- Country: France
- Region: Occitania
- Department: Hautes-Pyrénées
- Arrondissement: Argelès-Gazost
- Canton: La Vallée des Gaves

Government
  - Mayor (2020–2026): Eric Castagne
- Area^{1}: 29.38 km^{2} (11.34 sq mi)
- Elevation: 830 m (2,720 ft)
- Highest elevation: 2,965 m (9,728 ft)
- Lowest elevation: 640 m (2,100 ft)
- Population (2023): 159
  - Density: 5.41/km^{2} (14.0/sq mi)
- Time zone: UTC+01:00 (CET)
  - Summer (DST): UTC+02:00 (CEST)
- INSEE/Postal code: 65413 /65120
- ^{1} French Land Register data, which excludes lakes, ponds, glaciers > 1 km^{2} (0.386 sq mi or 247 acres) and river estuaries.

Sazos (French pronunciation: [sazɔs]; Gascon: Sasòs) is a commune in the Hautes-Pyrénées department in south-western France.

== See also ==
- Communes of the Hautes-Pyrénées department
