= Viella, Hautes-Pyrénées =

Viella
- Commune
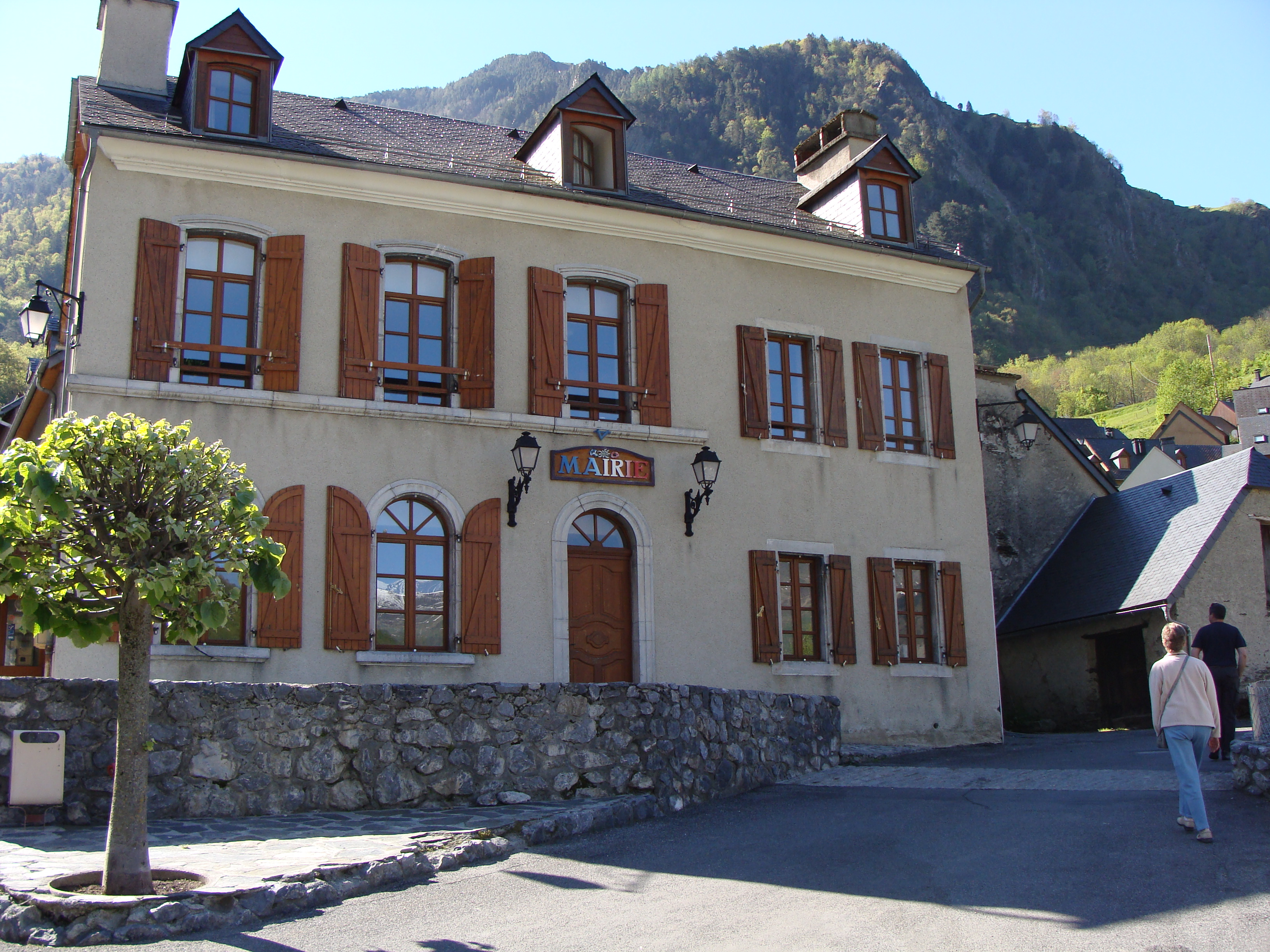
- The town hall

- Coat of arms
- Location of Viella
- Location within France Location within Occitanie
- Coordinates: 42°52′40″N 0°00′54″E
- Country: France
- Region: Occitania
- Department: Hautes-Pyrénées
- Arrondissement: Argelès-Gazost
- Canton: La Vallée des Gaves

Government
  - Mayor (2020–2026): Jean-Pierre Cots
- Area^{1}: 3.14 km^{2} (1.21 sq mi)
- Elevation: 800 m (2,600 ft)
- Highest elevation: 1,987 m (6,519 ft)
- Lowest elevation: 772 m (2,533 ft)
- Population (2023): 83
  - Density: 26/km^{2} (68/sq mi)
- Time zone: UTC+01:00 (CET)
  - Summer (DST): UTC+02:00 (CEST)
- INSEE/Postal code: 65463 /65120
- ^{1} French Land Register data, which excludes lakes, ponds, glaciers > 1 km^{2} (0.386 sq mi or 247 acres) and river estuaries.

Viella (French pronunciation: [vjɛla]; Occitan: Vielar) is a commune in the Hautes-Pyrénées department in south-western France.

== See also ==
- Communes of the Hautes-Pyrénées department
