= Luz-Saint-Sauveur =

Commune in Hautes-Pyrénées, Frances

- Commune
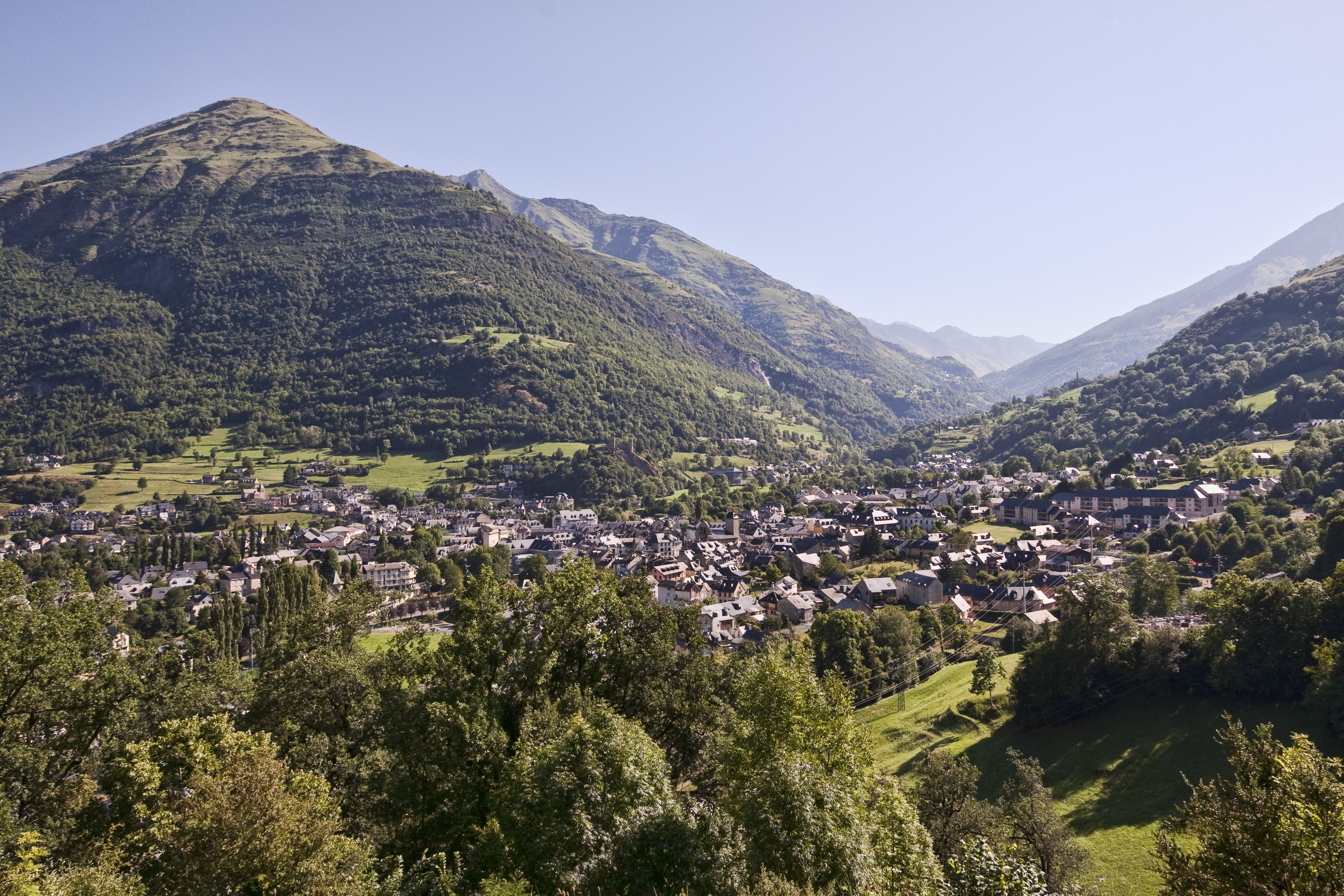
- The village of Luz-Saint-Sauveur

- Coat of arms
- Location of Luz-Saint-Sauveur
- Location within France Location within Occitanie
- Coordinates: 42°52′21″N 0°00′02″W
- Country: France
- Region: Occitania
- Department: Hautes-Pyrénées
- Arrondissement: Argelès-Gazost
- Canton: La Vallée des Gaves

Government
  - Mayor (2022–2026): Annie Sagnes
- Area^{1}: 50.38 km^{2} (19.45 sq mi)
- Elevation: 711 m (2,333 ft)
- Highest elevation: 3,194 m (10,479 ft)
- Lowest elevation: 677 m (2,221 ft)
- Population (2023): 900
  - Density: 18/km^{2} (46/sq mi)
- Time zone: UTC+01:00 (CET)
  - Summer (DST): UTC+02:00 (CEST)
- INSEE/Postal code: 65295 /65120
- ^{1} French Land Register data, which excludes lakes, ponds, glaciers > 1 km^{2} (0.386 sq mi or 247 acres) and river estuaries.

Luz-Saint-Sauveur (French pronunciation: [lys sɛ̃ sovœʁ]; Gascon: Lus e Sent Sauvaire, before 1962: Luz) is a commune in the Hautes-Pyrénées department in the Occitania region of south-western France. It lies on the river Bastan, a tributary of the Gave de Pau. Its inhabitants are called Luzéens and Luzéennes in French. The town features locations of historical heritage such as the church of Saint-André, also known as "Les Templiers", the Château Sainte-Marie or the spa district. Protected by mountains to the east, west and south, and separated from the plain to the north by the Pierrefitte gorge, Luz-Saint-Sauveur is somewhat geographically isolated though it is only a 1/2 hour drive from Lourdes.

== Places and monuments ==
=== Templar church ===
Called "the Templars" (actually Hospitallers of Saint John of Jerusalem), the church of St. Andrew was built in the 12th and 13th centuries. In the 14th century, the Hospitallers of Saint John of Jerusalem built walls around the church to protect the inhabitants of Luz from attacks by Spanish bandits called 'irregulars'. At that time, a large ditch surrounded the church, crossed by a drawbridge. A few years later, the chapel Notre-Dame-de-la-Pitié was built inside the ramparts to ask God to put an end to an epidemic of black plague which devastated the country Toy around 1650. In 1865, a new door was added to facilitate entry. It is a listed monument since 1840.

=== Château Sainte-Marie (ruins) ===
Perched at the top of a rocky outcrop, the Château Sainte-Marie has over the centuries been a location of strategic importance for the valley and also a place of refuge for the population. It was built in the 10th century by the Counts of Bigorre. In the 14th century, it was the occupied by the Hospitallers of St John of Jerusalem. The castle and valley were in the possession of the English Crown from 1360 until 1404, when an army of the Comte de Clermont, assisted by the inhabitants of the valley and commanded by Aougé de Coufitte, took the castle and drove the English from the valley. The castle was then gradually abandoned. Its restoration was undertaken in the 1980s, thus safeguarding one of the most significant vestiges of the history of the valley. The remains of the Château Sainte-Marie have been listed as historic monuments since October 16, 1930. Although commonly described as being within Luz-Saint-Sauveur, the castle is actually located in the neighboring town of Esterre.

=== The Solferino chapel ===
This chapel with its Byzantine tower was rebuilt in 1859 on the orders of Emperor Napoleon III in honour of the victims of the Battle of Solferino, on the ruins of the ancient chapel of St. Peter founded by the Knights Hospitaller in the Middle Ages. For a long time, its priest blessed the herds at the beginning to the high pastures of the mountain.

=== The Napoleon Bridge ===
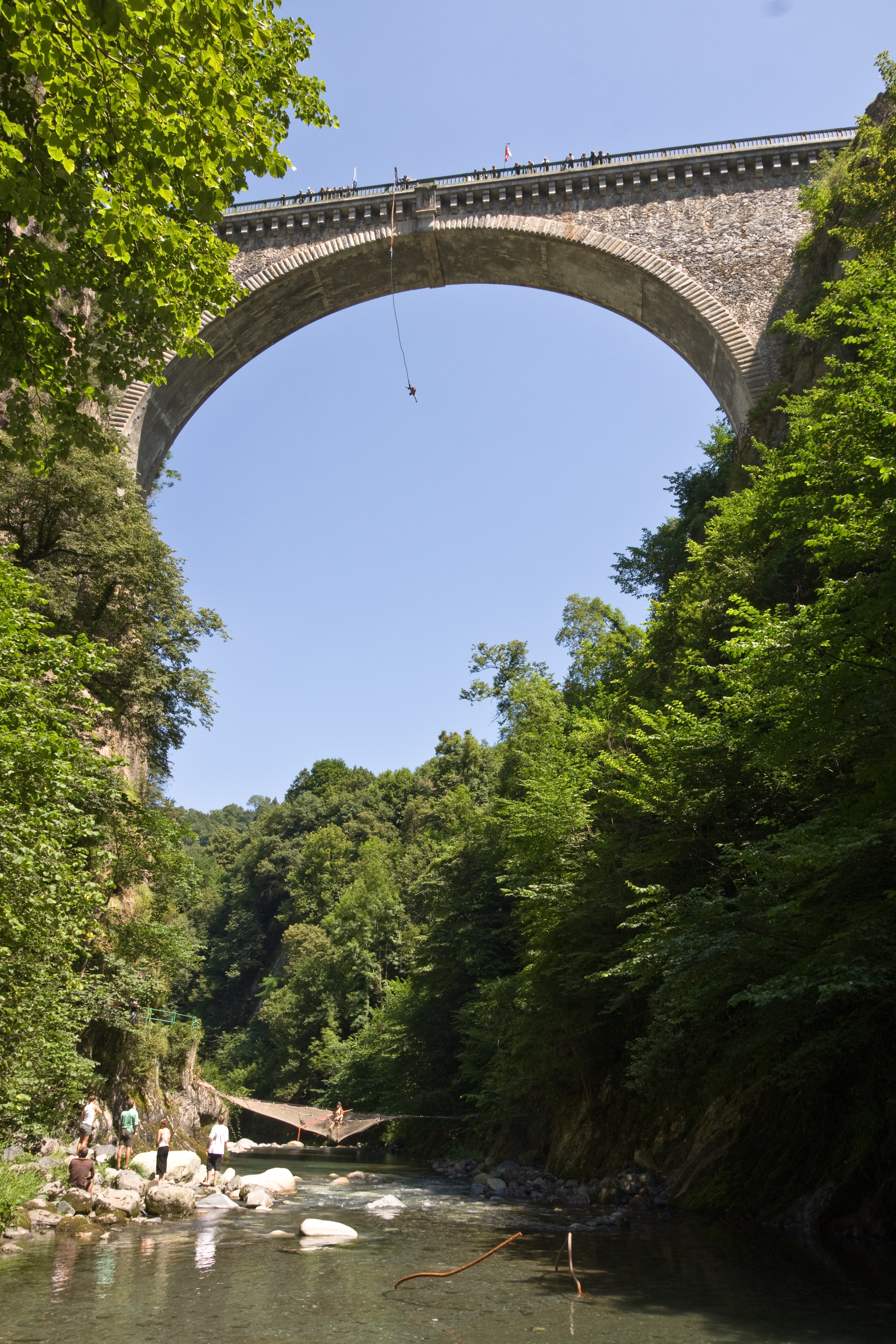
Pont Napoléon

Napoleon III fell in love with the Pyrenees and made several stays in the company of Empress Eugenie. His great work at Saint-Sauveur was the realization of an idea that was dear to him: connecting the two banks of the Gavarnie Gave by building a bridge. An "American" and a "wire" design were considered before finally designing a stone bridge of a single arch. Begun immediately, under the leadership of Mr. Bruniquel, Engineer of Roads and Bridges, the work lasted two years and was completed in June 1861. The deck of the bridge is 68 meters in length, and is located 63 m above the Gave. The arch that supports it is 42 m in diameter. The vault rests directly on the steep rocks that border the Gave. The height of the water level at the base of the vault is 40 m; it is 63 m at the keystone and 65 m at the bridge.

To commemorate the memory of the Emperor's stay and its benefits, the Barèges Valley Trade Union Committee erected a column 12 m high, surmounted by a colossal eagle, at the eastern end of the bridge. The column, consisting of 14 rings, is made of Lourdes stone. The eagle was made at the marble factory of Bagneres. The total height, eagle included, is 14 m. The column bears the inscription: "To their imperial Majesties Napoleon III and the Empress Eugénie, the inhabitants of LUZ St. SAVIOR is grateful".

The bridge was open to traffic in 1861 and in September 1863, Napoleon III finally inaugurated the bridge.

== See also ==
- Communes of the Hautes-Pyrénées department
