= Lavedan =

Natural region of France

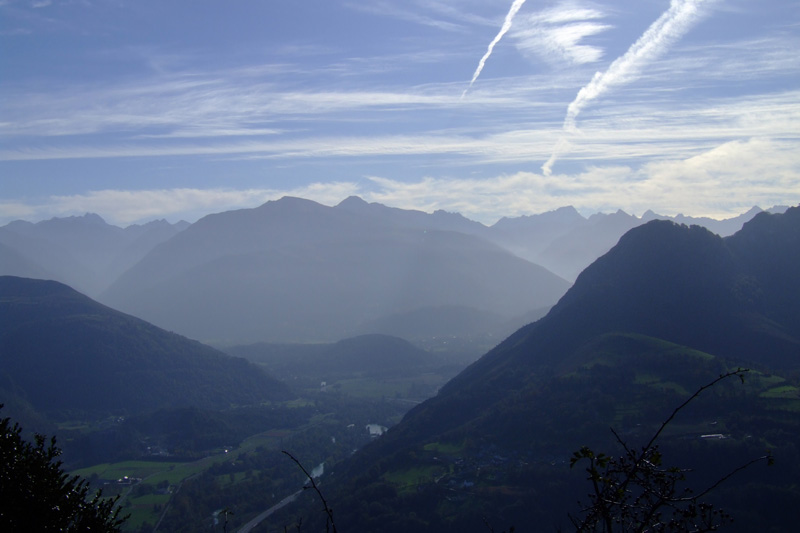
- Entrée du Lavedan, photo prise depuis le pic du Jer.
- Length: 50 km (31 mi) North

Geology
- Type: Vallées glaciaires

Geography
- Location: Hautes-Pyrénées, Occitanie, France
- Population centers: Argelès-Gazost, Pierrefitte-Nestalas, Cauterets, Luz-Saint-Sauveur
- Coordinates: 43.0°N 0.1°W
- Mountain range: Pyrénées
- Traversed by: Gave de Pau
- Interactive map of Lavedan

The Lavedan (French pronunciation: [lavdɑ̃]; in Gascon eth/lo Lavedan, /et/lu laβedã/), or occasionally vallées des Gaves, denotes a mountainous natural region of France, located at the heart of the Pyrénées, and forms a group of valleys upstream of Lourdes.

The Lavedan is historically part of the Gascony province and of the county of Bigorre. Today, it is situated in the Hautes-Pyrénées department in the Occitanie region.

== Etymology ==
The name "Lavedan" is documented under ancient forms: in pago Lavetanense (v. 860), Levitanensis vicecomes (v. 980), vicecomites Levitanicæ vallis (v. 1060), Ramundus de Levitania (1095), homines Baredgie et Levitani (v. 1110), A. de Laueda (1114), Aramon Garsie de Lavedan (1283), terram de Lavedaa (1285).

Il is made up of the Latin -etan, -itan suffix, typically present in names of iberian peoples. Le radical est Lau- / Leu-.

== Geography ==
=== Topography ===
The Lavedan is made up of 7 valleys, which in the past formed relatively self-sufficient and autonomous entities (they were named under vath, arribèra « valley » ou d'estrem "excentred valley"):

La Vath Surguèra (prononcé 'Bat surguère')
A small valley on the left bank at the entrance of the Lavedan which groups the towns of Ségus, Aspin-en-Lavedan, Ossen, Omex, Viger.

L'estrem de Castèth-lobon (pronounced 'Casteth Loubou') or Castelloubon
which corresponds to the Néez basin, located on Cheust and Ourdis-Cotdoussan (the name comes from Castellum Lupi "Wolf castle", founded by the first count of the Lavedan, Mansion Loup of the Loup dynasty from which dukes of Gascony and counts of Bigorre were born, at the beginning of the 10th century, the viscounts' residence until the beginning of the 11th century, it comprises the towns of Juncalas, Geu, Ger, Lugagnan, Saint-Créac (which today includes Antalos and Justous), Ousté, Berbérust-Lias, Ourdis-Cotdoussan, Germs-sur-l'Oussouet, Cheust, Gazost, Ourdon.

L'estrem de Sala ou Estrèm de Salles
Argelès (formerly Ourout and Vieuzac, which became Argelès-Gazost in 1897), Ayzac-Ost, Agos-Vidalos, Ouzous, Salles, Sère-en-Lavedan, Gez.

The val d'Azun
constituted of the Arren and Estaing valleys as well as the Bergons and the right bank of the high valley of l'Ouzoum, comprises the villages of Arrens, Marsous, Aucun, Gaillagos, Arcizans-Dessus, Arras-en-Lavedan, Sireix, Bun, Estaing, Arbéost, Ferrières (including Hougarou).

Le Davant-Aiga (pronounces Dabant-Aygues = East of the waters)
It correspond to the eastern bank of the gave du Lavedan and includes the towns of Préchac, Boô-Silhen (including Asmets), Saint-Pastous (including Senta-Maria), Ayros-Arbouix, Vier-Bordes, Artalens-Souin, Beaucens, Villelongue (including Ortiac).

L'arribèra de Sent Savin ou Rivière de Saint-Savin
Saint-Savin, Lau-Balagnas, Adast, Pierrefitte-Nestalas, Soulom, Uz, Cauterets, Arcizans-Avant.

The Barèja valley (French 'Barège') named « Pays Toy »
Luz-Saint-Sauveur, Sassis, Sazos, Grust, Saligos, Chèze, Viscos, Vizos, Esquièze-Sère, Esterre, Viella, Betpouey, Barèges, Sers, Viey, Gèdre, Gavarnie.

=== Hydrography ===
The Lavedan corresponds to the Gave de Pau bassin, upstream from Lourdes namely with the valleys of the Gave de Gavarnie, the Gave de Cauterets and the Gave d'Azun.

=== Delimitation ===
The Lavedan communicates with the vallée de Campan (vallée de l'Adour) by the col du Tourmalet and with the vallée d'Ossau by the cirque du Litor (east of col d'Aubisque; the left bank of the vallée de l'Ouzom is part of Ossau while the right bank is part of the val d'Azun). It is separated from Aragon by the France–Spain border, traversable by numerous mountain passes.

=== Main sites ===
The main towns are Argelès-Gazost, Pierrefitte-Nestalas, Cauterets, Luz-Saint-Sauveur, Gèdre and Gavarnie.

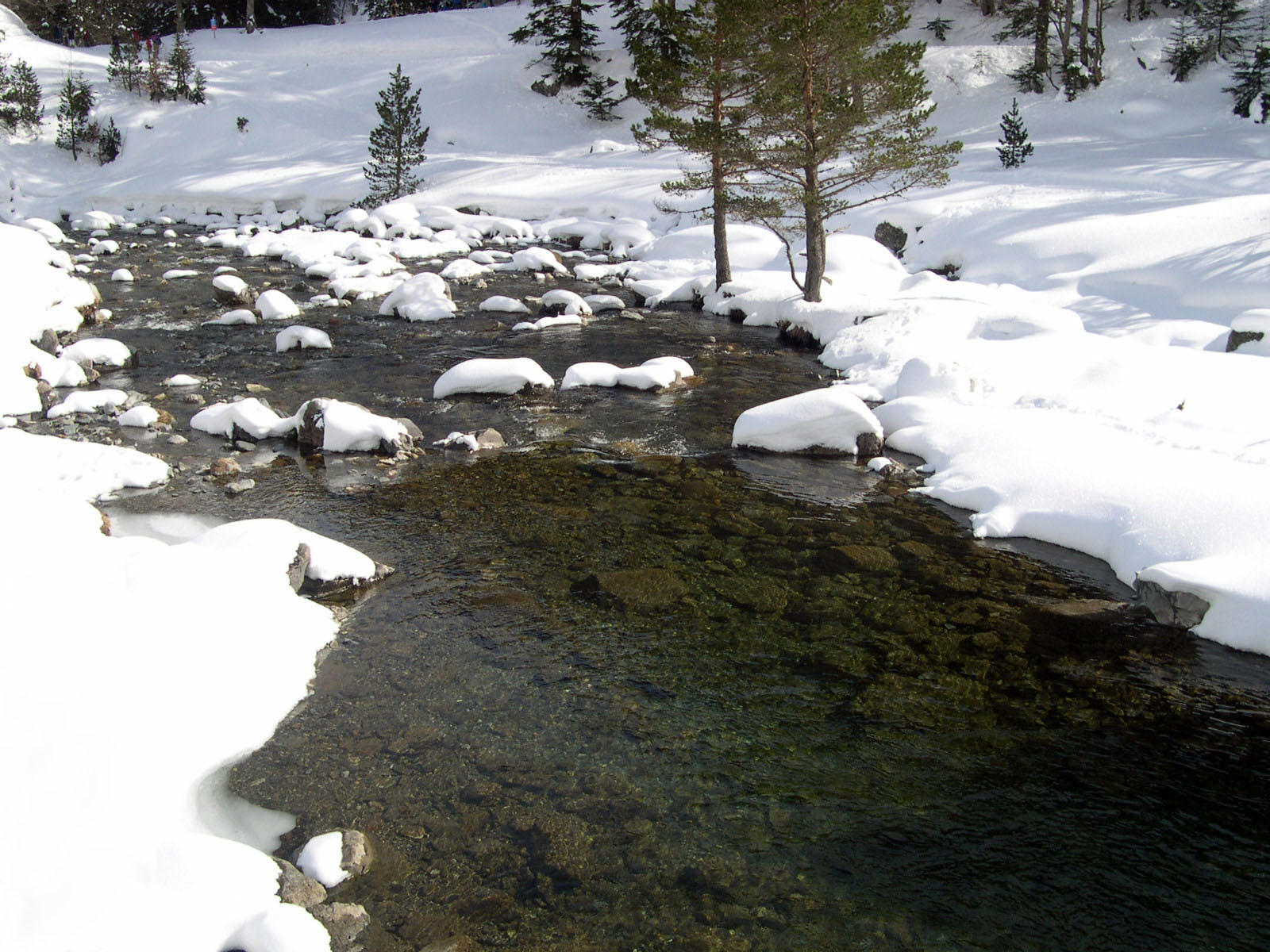
Snow-covered river near Cauterets

The major mountain sites are:

- Vignemale
- Pic de Néouvielle (Neuvielha)
- Cirque de Gavarnie
- Lac de Gaube
- Pont d'Espagne
