= Château de Beaucens =

14th-century ruined castle in Hautes-Pyrénées, France

Coordinates: 42°58′19″N 0°03′35″E

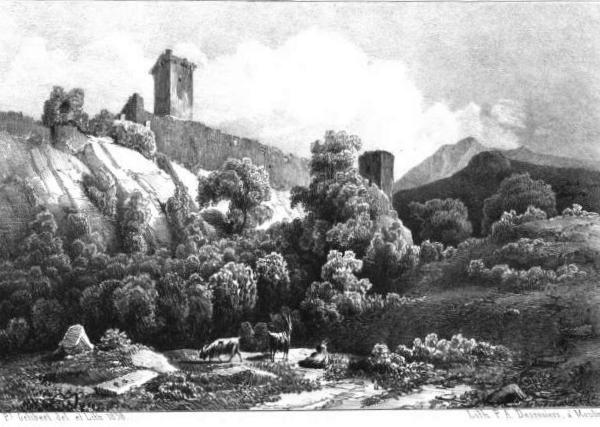
Château de Beaucens, 1836

The Château de Beaucens, is a 14th-century ruined castle in the commune of Beaucens in the Hautes-Pyrénées département of France. The site has been transformed into a zoological park, the "Donjon des Aigles" (eagles' keep), where one may admire birds of prey in flight around the ruins of the castle, with a view over the vallée des Gaves.

== History ==
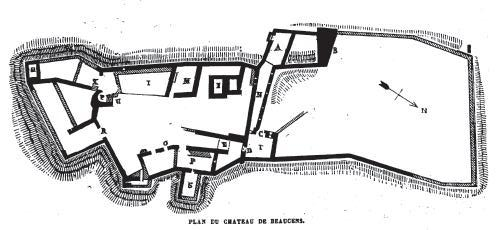
Plan of Château de Beaucens in 1866

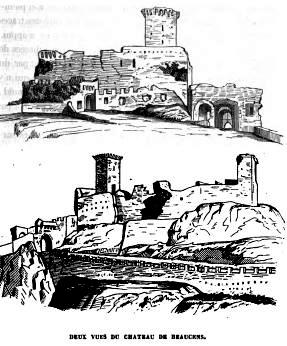
Views of Château de Beaucens in 1866

Construction of the castle began in 1037. Altered and expanded several times, it was the property of the Viscounts of Castet-Loubon commonly known as the Viscounts of Lavedan. It was the normal residence of the viscountcy, the most powerful in Bigorre with vast possessions including seventeen towns in the Barèges valley, They owned it for several centuries, but from the 15th century, they rarely stayed there, using it only when conducting business in the area.

In 1560, in events leading up to the French Wars of Religion, the Viscount, as a Huguenot, saw his castle pillaged by Catholic forces.

The castle was inhabited in 1643, when it belonged then to the house of Montaut-Bénac

Madame de Motteville stayed at the castle for the wedding of Louis XIV and Maria Theresa of Spain, on 9 June 1660 at the church of Saint John the Baptiste in Saint-Jean-de-Luz. She compared it to the palace of the fairy Urgande.

Prince Charles Louis Gaspard de Rohan-Rochefort, the 31st and last viscount, who lived there, had married his cousin, Marie Louise Joséphine de Rohan. He was extremely unpopular with the population of Bigorre. In 1792, during the French Revolution, he fled to Austria leaving behind his wife - she asked for and received a divorce - and his papers. When the castle was set on fire, they were lost. The Princess managed to keep some of the property, including the castle: in 1802 she sold all of the possessions in Bigorre. The castle then belonged to a succession of owners.

An earthquake in 1854 caused part of the enceinte to collapse. In 1856, the castle became the property of Achille Marcus Fould (1800 - 1867), the famous banker and politician. He was Minister of Finance during the Second Republic under Napoleon III and Minister of State from 1852 to 1860 during the Second Empire of Napoleon III. The castle was restored by Fould but remained a ruin overgrown by vegetation.

It was inscribed on the list of monuments historiques in 1927.

== Legend of the eagle and the trout ==
In the Bigorre region, legend tells of a long siege of the castle by Charlemagne which ended because an eagle with a trout in its beak led the besiegers to believe that the castle had abundant fresh food.

== Geology ==
At the foot of the castle is a cold sulfurous spring which was drunk by the inhabitants of Beaucens and a lead mine in the rock on which the castle stands.

== Donjon des aigles ==
Since 1973, the castle has housed one of the world's most important collections of birds of prey: : kites, vulture, eagles, sea eagles, falcons and buzzards. Displays are given featuring an Egyptian vulture, who breaks an imitation ostrich egg with a stone, as well as a condor, various owls, parakeets and parrots.

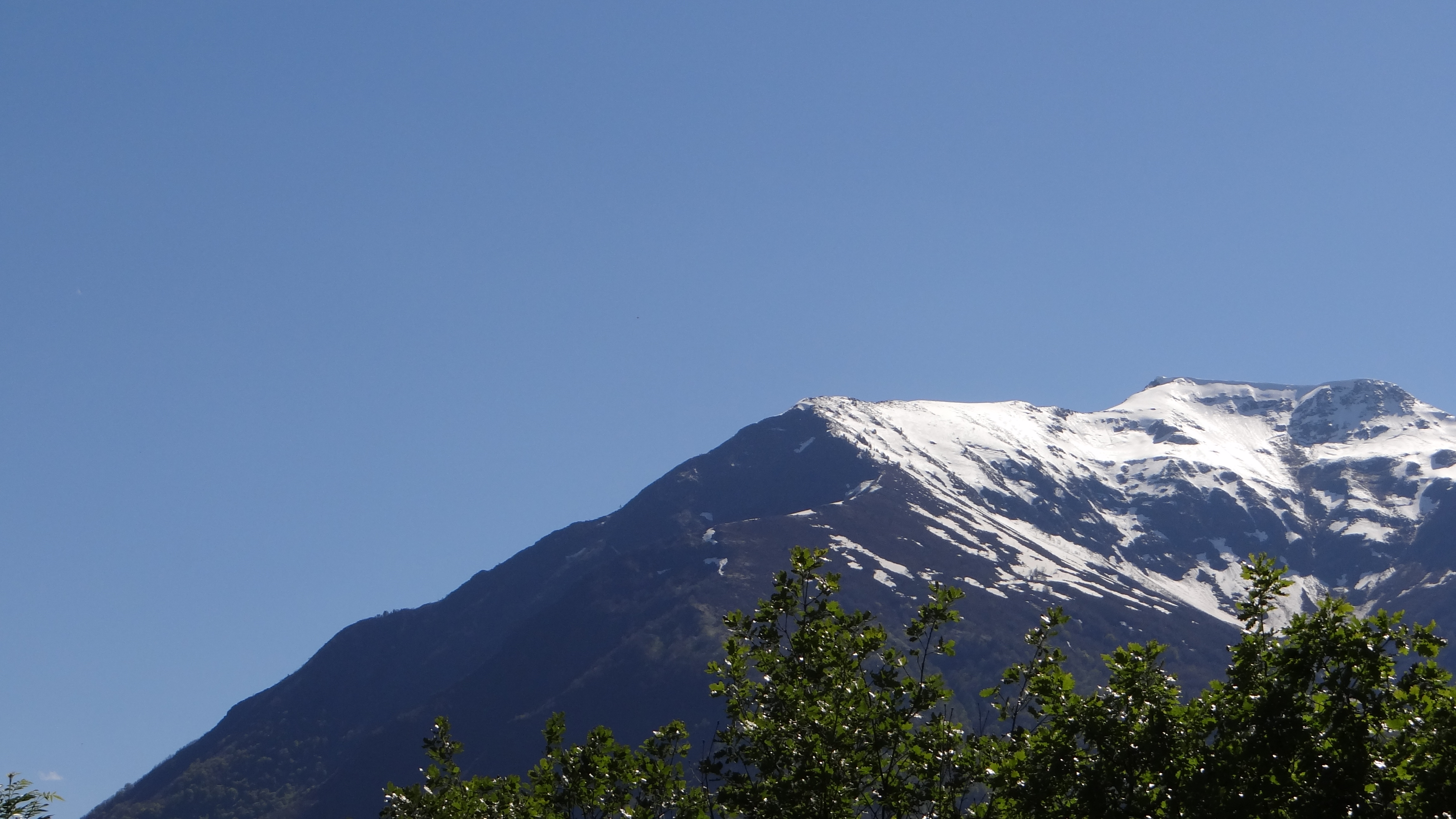
View of the castle

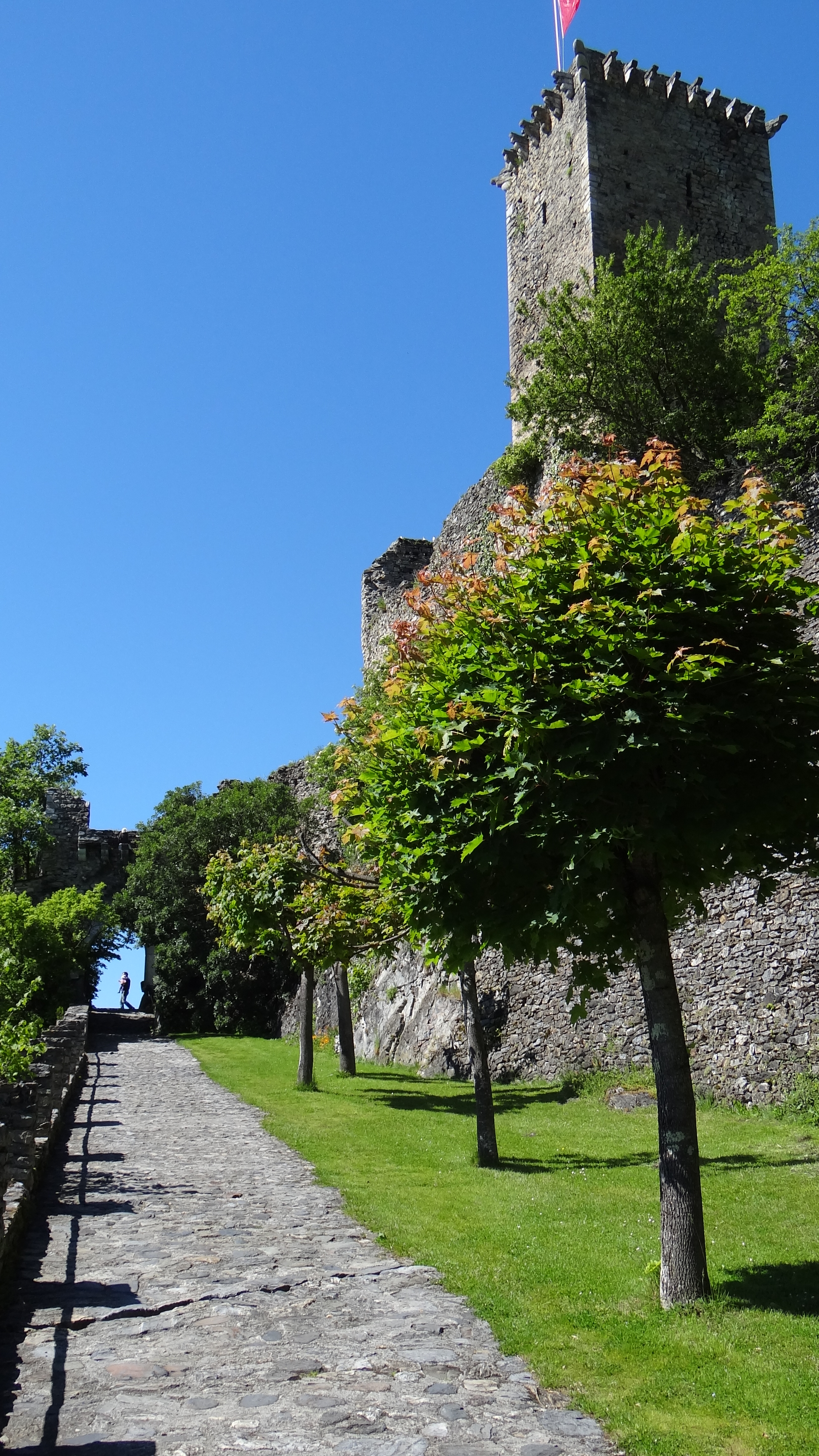

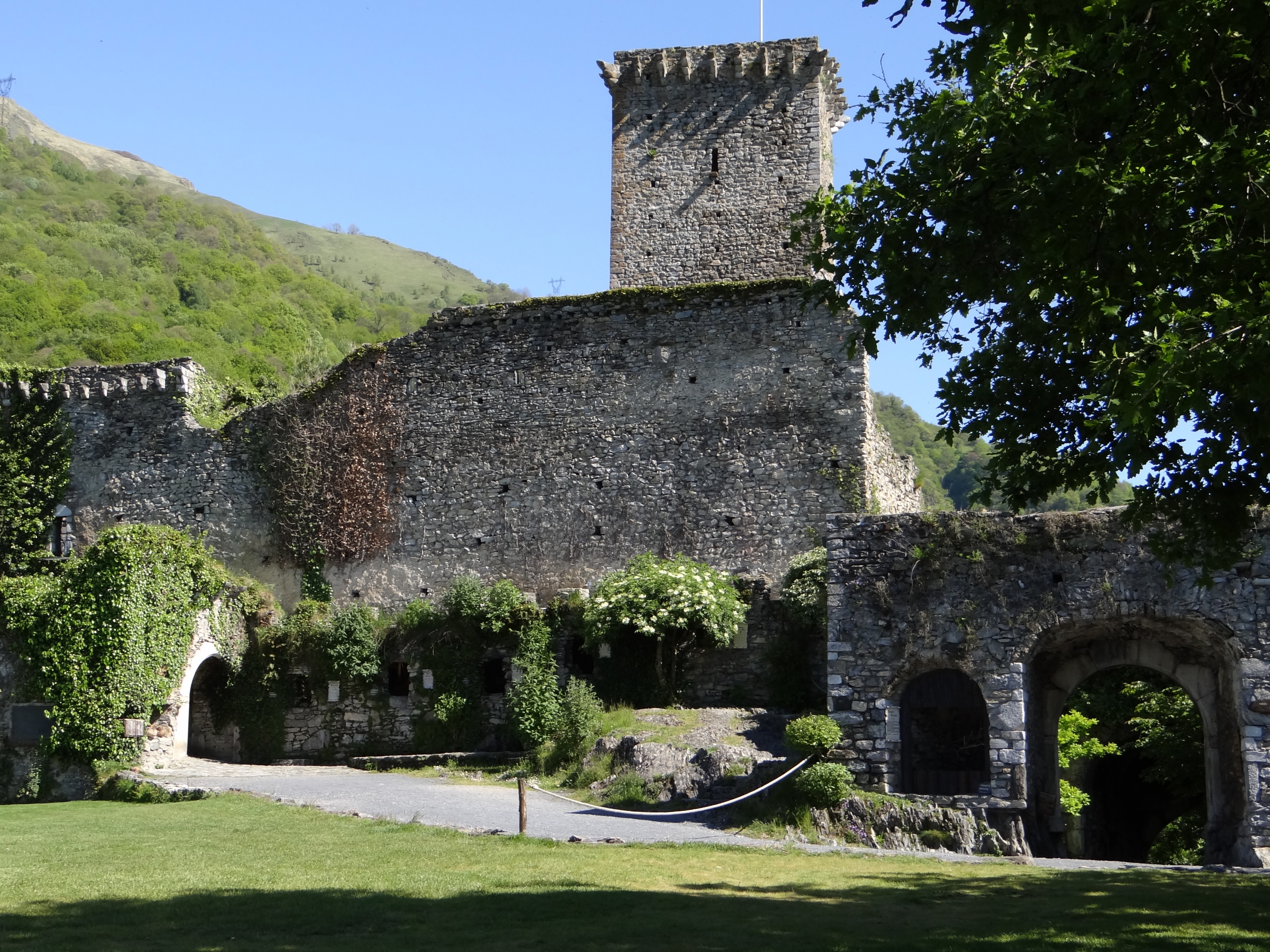
Donjon des Aigles in 2013

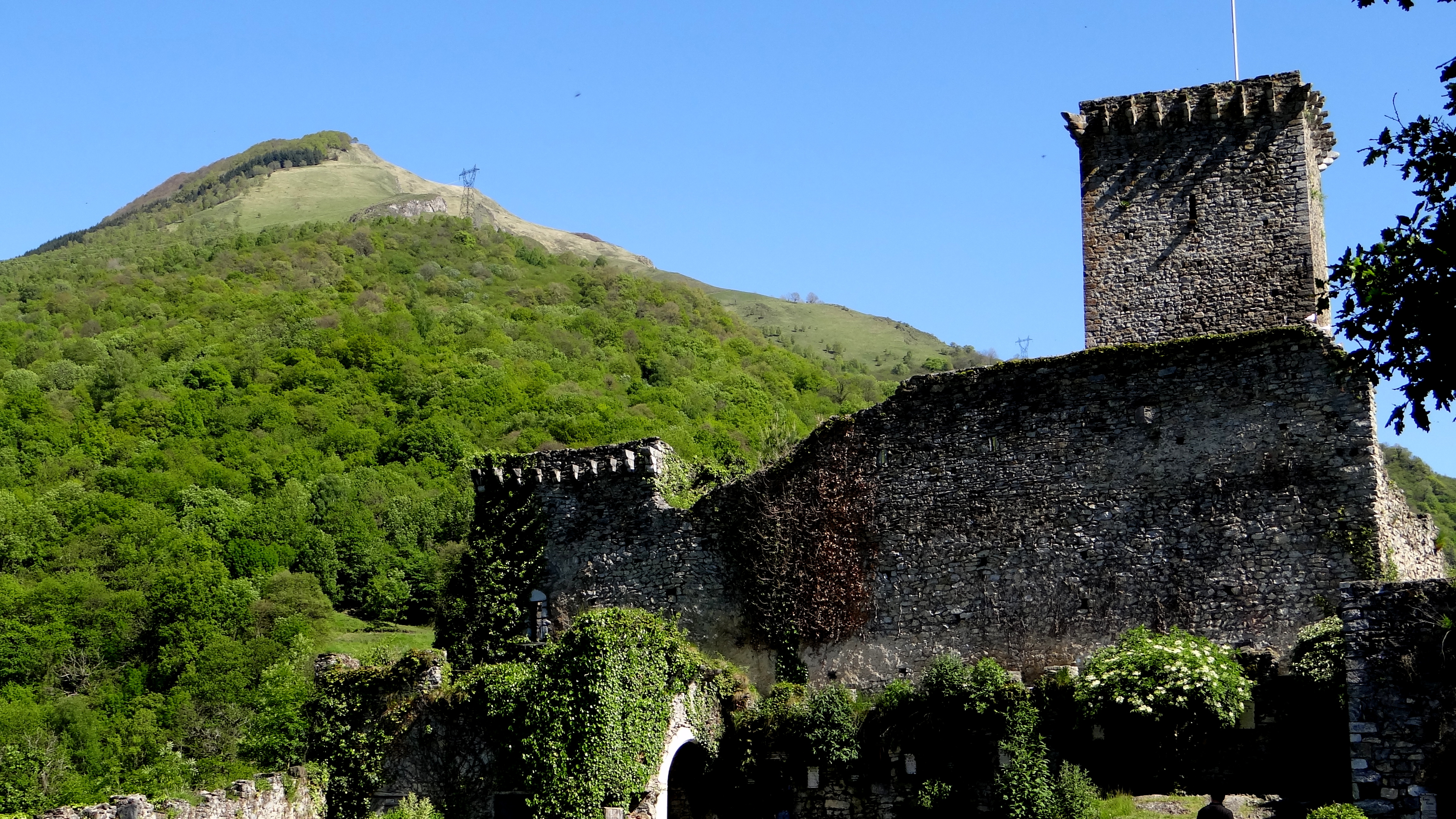

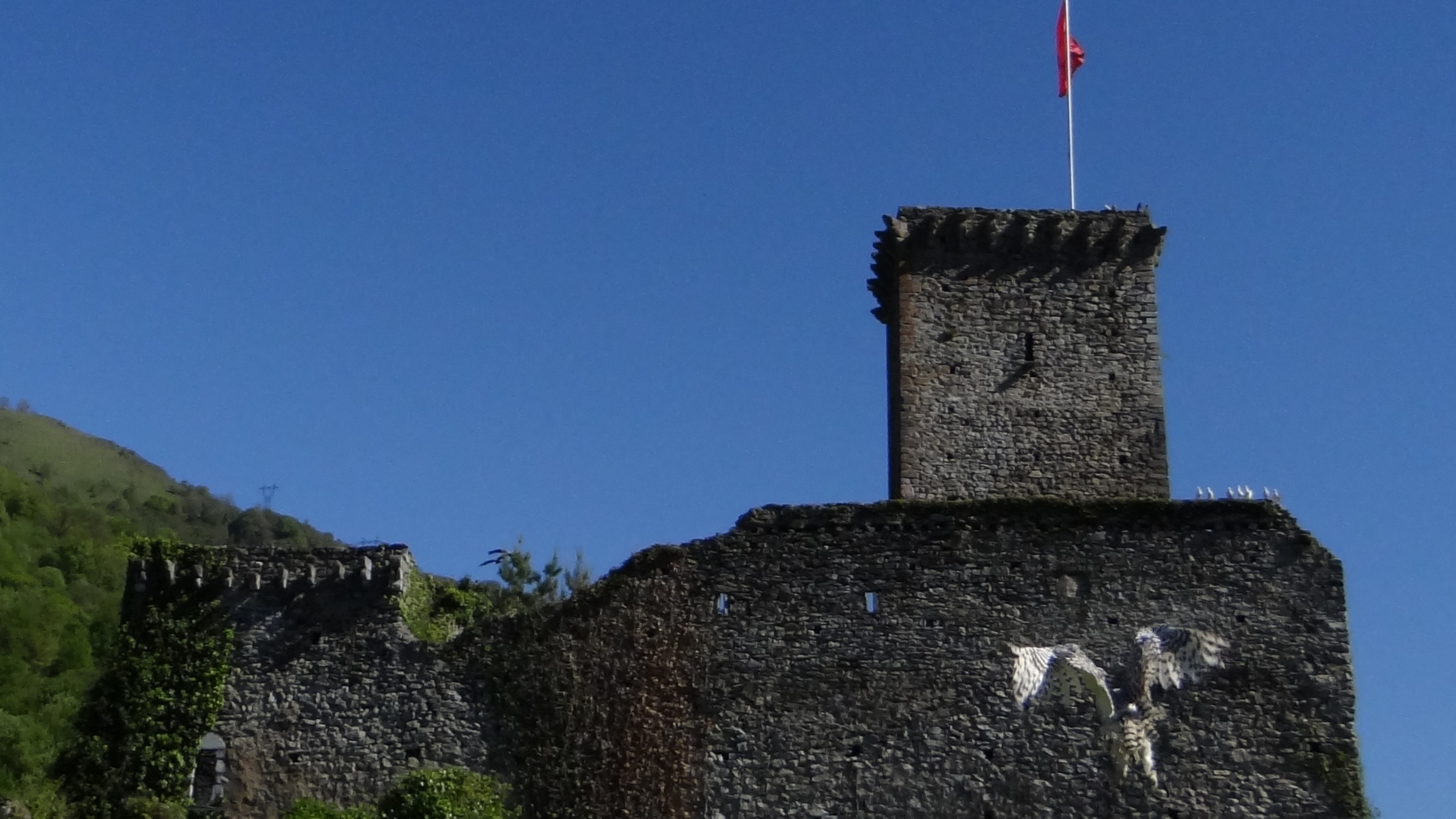

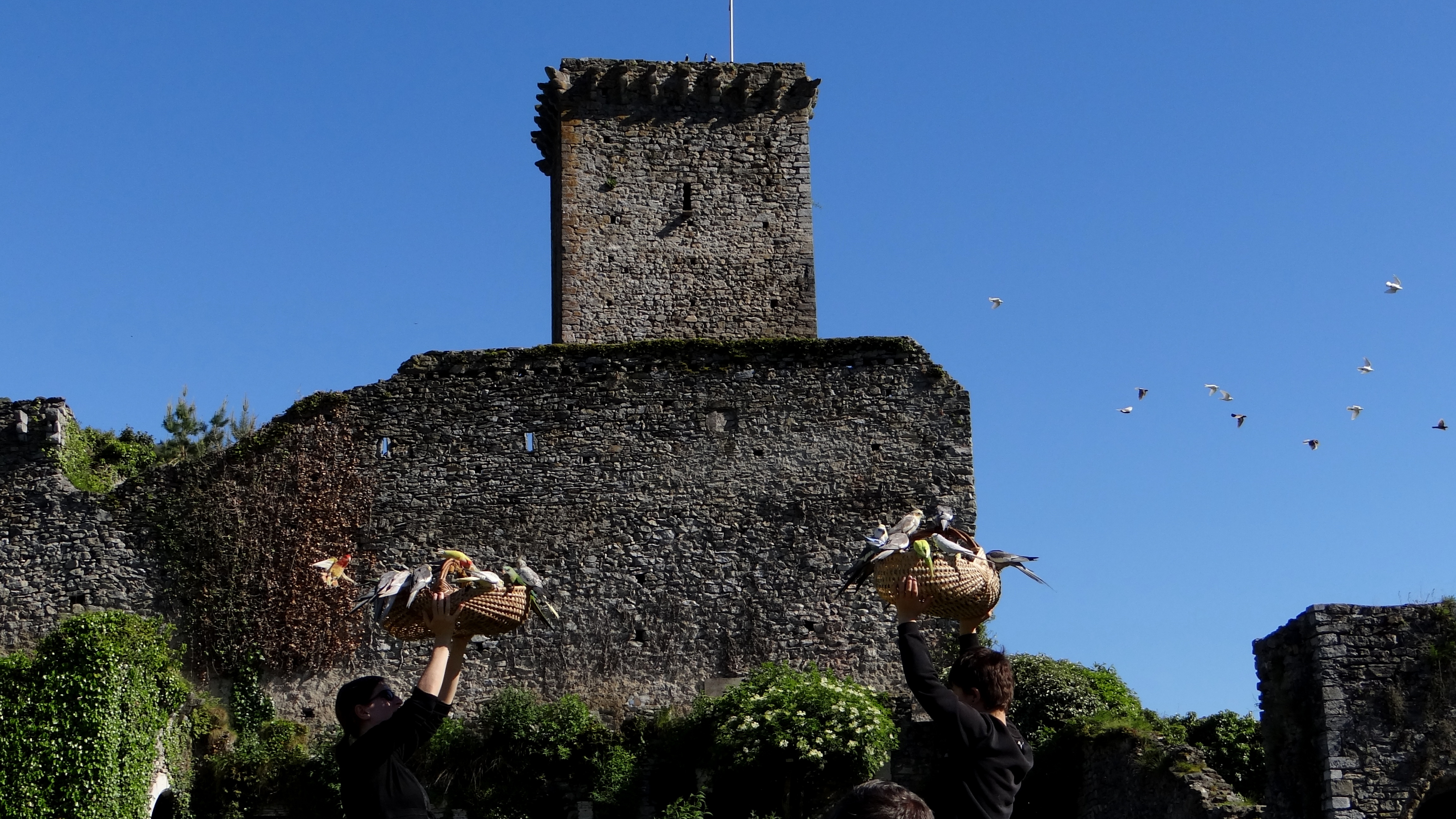

== See also ==
- List of castles in France
