= Beaucens =

- Commune
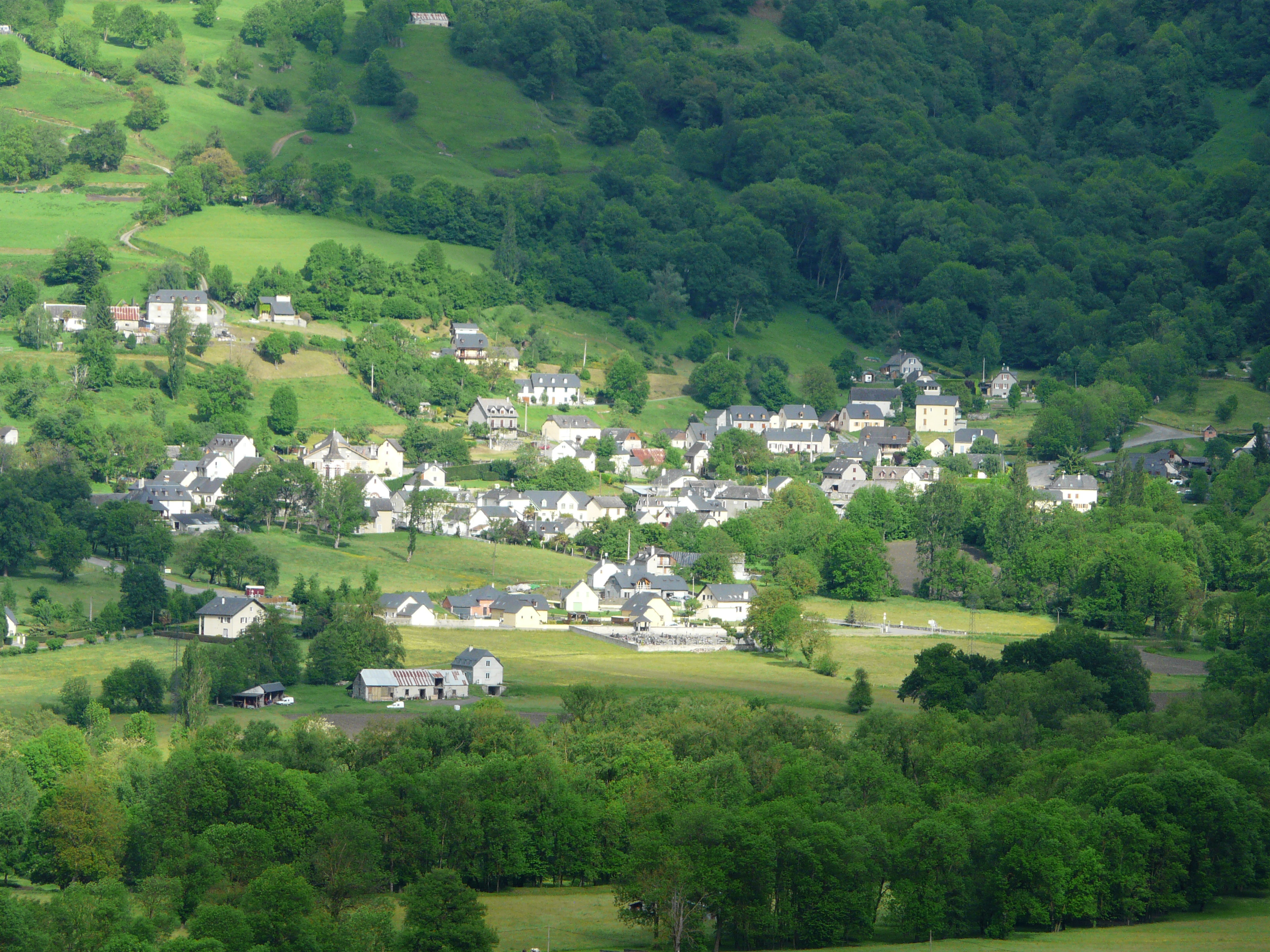
- The village of Beaucens

- Coat of arms
- Location of Beaucens
- Location within France Location within Occitanie
- Coordinates: 42°58′39″N 0°03′35″W
- Country: France
- Region: Occitania
- Department: Hautes-Pyrénées
- Arrondissement: Argelès-Gazost
- Canton: La Vallée des Gaves

Government
  - Mayor (2024–2026): Audrey Boyrie
- Area^{1}: 36.82 km^{2} (14.22 sq mi)
- Elevation: 480 m (1,570 ft)
- Highest elevation: 2,637 m (8,652 ft)
- Lowest elevation: 434 m (1,424 ft)
- Population (2023): 413
  - Density: 11.2/km^{2} (29.1/sq mi)
- Time zone: UTC+01:00 (CET)
  - Summer (DST): UTC+02:00 (CEST)
- INSEE/Postal code: 65077 /65400
- ^{1} French Land Register data, which excludes lakes, ponds, glaciers > 1 km^{2} (0.386 sq mi or 247 acres) and river estuaries.

Beaucens (French pronunciation: [bosɛ̃s]; Occitan: Beucens) is a commune in the Hautes-Pyrénées department in the Occitanie region of south-western France.

The inhabitants of the commune are known as Beaucinois or Beaucinoises.

== Geography ==
Beaucens is located in the Pyrénées National Park some 10 km south of Lourdes and 30 km south of Tarbes. Access to the commune is by the D913 from Préchac in the north which passes through the west of the commune and the village and continues south to join the D921 south-east of Soulom. The D13 goes north from the village to Ayros-Arbouix. Apart from the village there are the hamlets of Vielle, Gézat, and Nouillan. Most of the commune is rugged and inaccessible with some farmland in the west and forests south-east of the village. The Hautacam Ski resort is located in the centre of the commune

The Gave du Pau Ou du Lavedan flows through the west of the commune from south to north forming the Lac des Gaves before continuing north to become the Gave de Pau north of the commune. The Ruisseau des Bariquėres rises in the west of the commune and flows east to join the Gave du Pau Ou du Lavedan west of the village. The Ruisseau d'Estibos rises in the east of the commune and forms part of the north-eastern border before continuing west to join the Gave du Pau Ou du Lavedan. The Ruisseau d'Isaby flows east from the Lac d'Isaby forming part of the south-eastern border of the commune as it flows south-west to join the Gave de Gavarnie Ou de Pau at Soulom.

The commune is bordered by eight other communes (see table).

== Toponymy ==
Historical names

- Belsen, (around 870, Livre vert de Bénac, around 980, ibid;. 1050–1070, Cartulary of Saint-Savin; 1168, Papal bull of Pope Alexander III).
- Beusen, (1285, Montre Bigorre; 1300, Enquête Bigorre; 1313 Debita regi Navarre;).
- de Beucennio, Latin (1379 procuration of Tarbes).
- Beucen, Beussen, Beusen (1429 Censier de Bigorre).
- Beaussen, Beaucen, (1614, Guillaume Mauran).
- Beaucen en Lavedan, (1737-1779, parish records).
- Beucen, (1768, Duco).
- Beaucen, (1790, Department 1 and 2).

Beaucens appears as Beaucen on the 1750 Cassini Map and the same on the 1790 version.

=== Heraldry ===
Arms of Beaucens	Blazon: Party per pale, Argent, a crow sable posed on a branch Vert and surmounted by 2 crows sable in fess first; paly of 9 Or and Gules second.

== Administration ==
List of Successive Mayors

From	To	Name
1995	1995	André Ducasa
1995	2001	Claude Vielle
2001	2008	Monique Arrode
2008	2008	Claude Bat
2008	2020	Stéphanie Lacoste
2020	2026	François-Olivier Manson

== Demography ==
Historical population

Year	Pop.	±% p.a.
1793	379	—
1821	460	+0.69%
1846	502	+0.35%
1872	441	−0.50%
1901	335	−0.94%
1926	265	−0.93%
1946	237	−0.56%
1962	260	+0.58%
1968	247	−0.85%

Year	Pop.	±% p.a.
1975	244	−0.17%
1982	249	+0.29%
1990	309	+2.74%
1999	350	+1.39%
2007	437	+2.81%
2012	421	−0.74%
2017	409	−0.58%
2023	413	+0.16%

Source: EHESS and INSEE

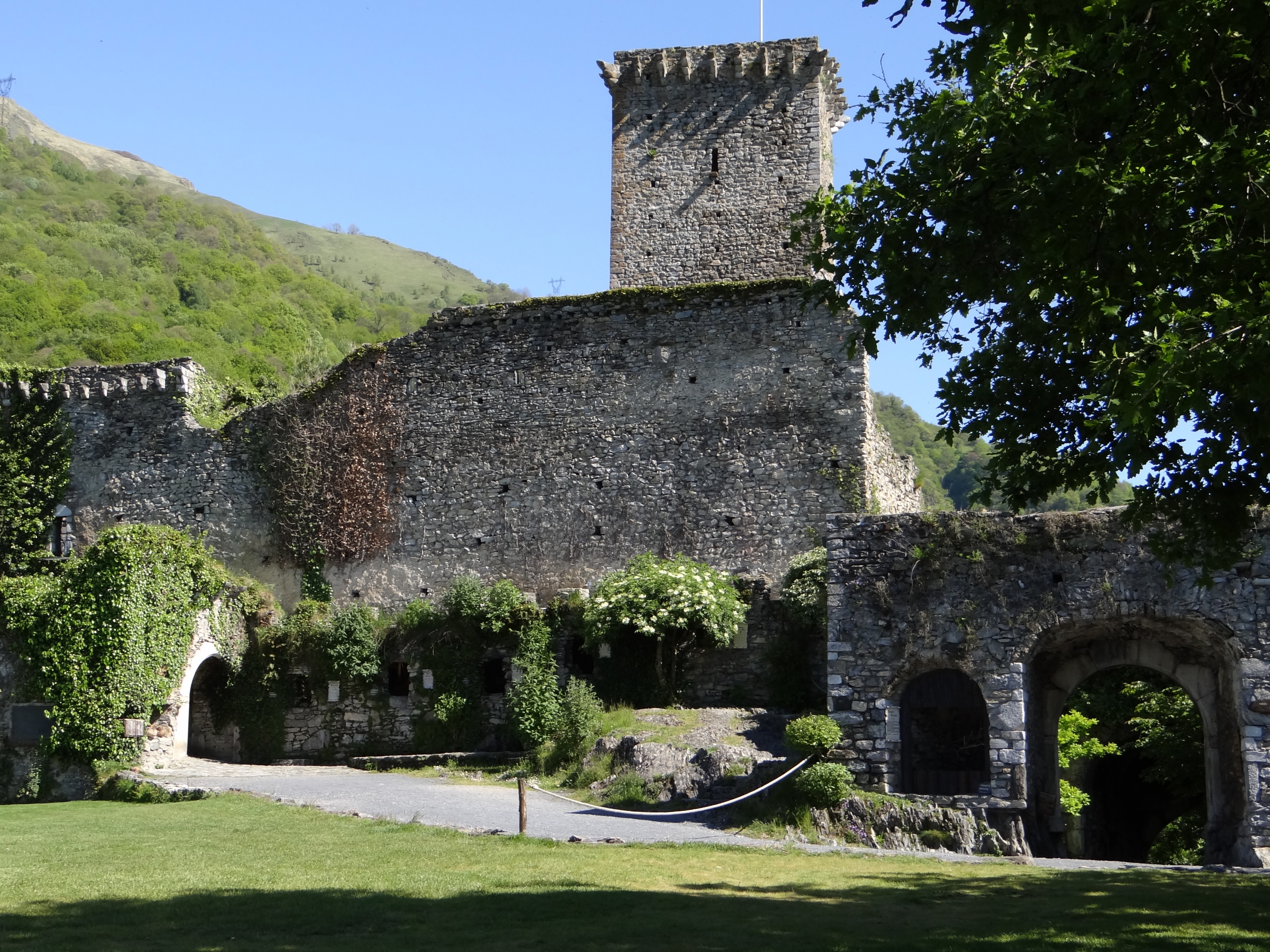
The Chateau of Beaucens

== Culture and heritage ==
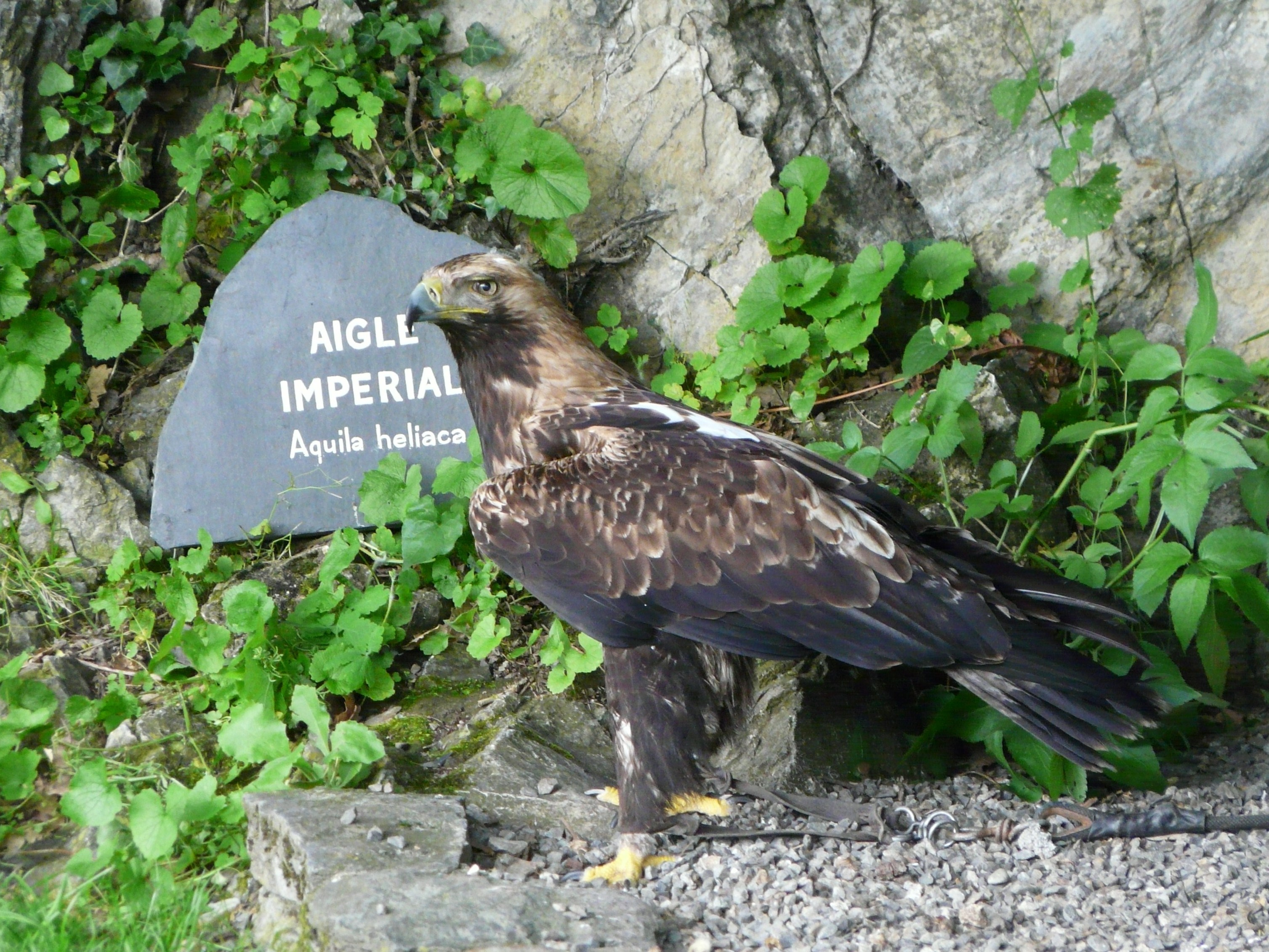
An Eastern imperial eagle at the Chateau of Beaucens

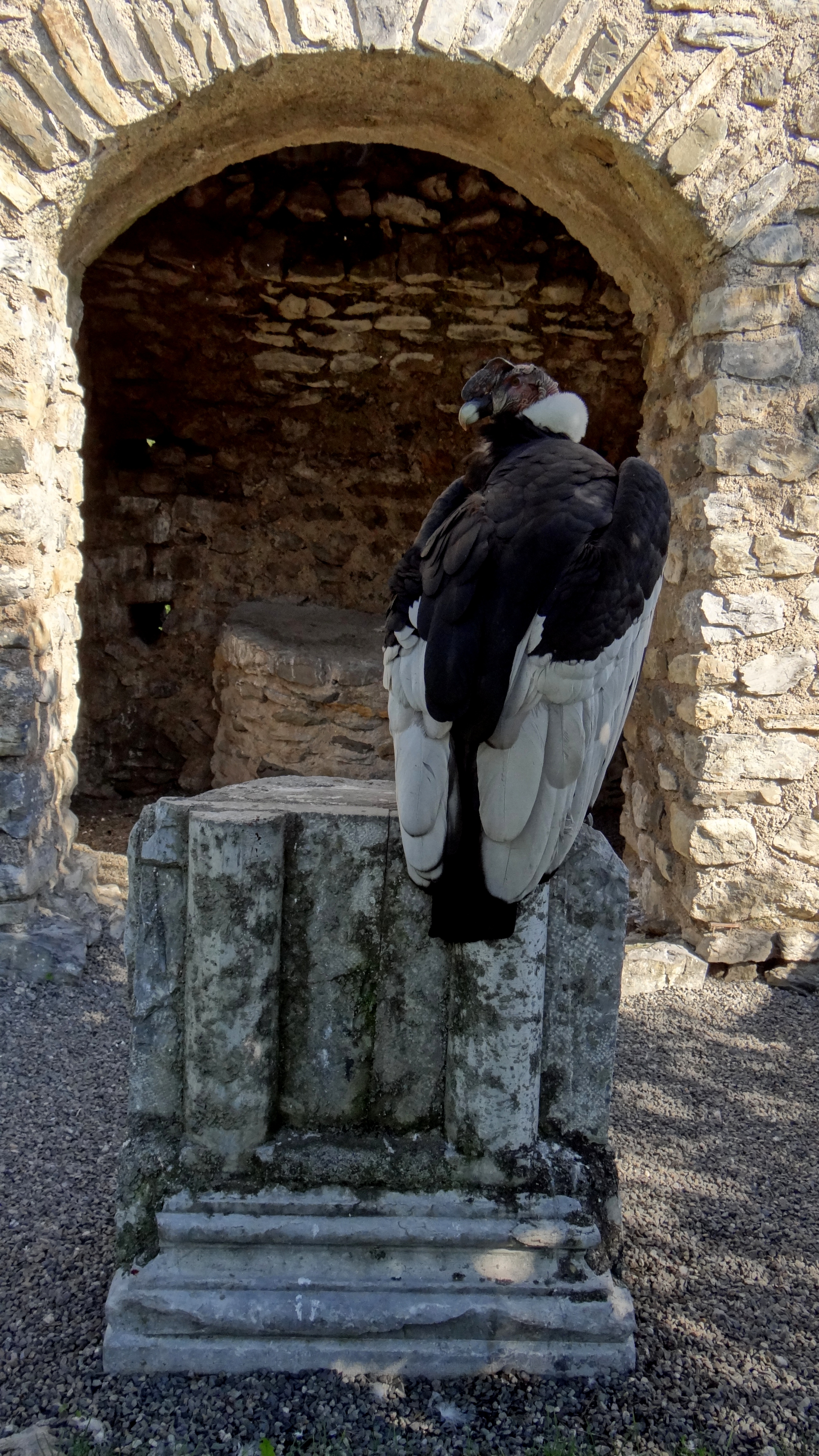
An Andean condor at the Chateau of Beaucens

=== Civil heritage ===
The commune has two buildings and sites that are registered as historical monuments:

- The Manor of Cohitte (1692)
- The Chateau of Beaucens (ruins) (14th century) is a former castle of the Viscounts of Lavedan. The site was transformed into a zoo, the Keep of Eagles, where there are birds of prey flying around the ruins of the castle with a view of the Gaves valley.

=== Religious heritage ===
The Church of Saint Vincent contains two items that are registered as historical objects:

- An Altar table (12th century)
- The Notre-Dame-de-Bedouret Statue (14th century)

== See also ==
- Communes of the Hautes-Pyrénées department
