= Pierrefitte-Nestalas =

- Commune
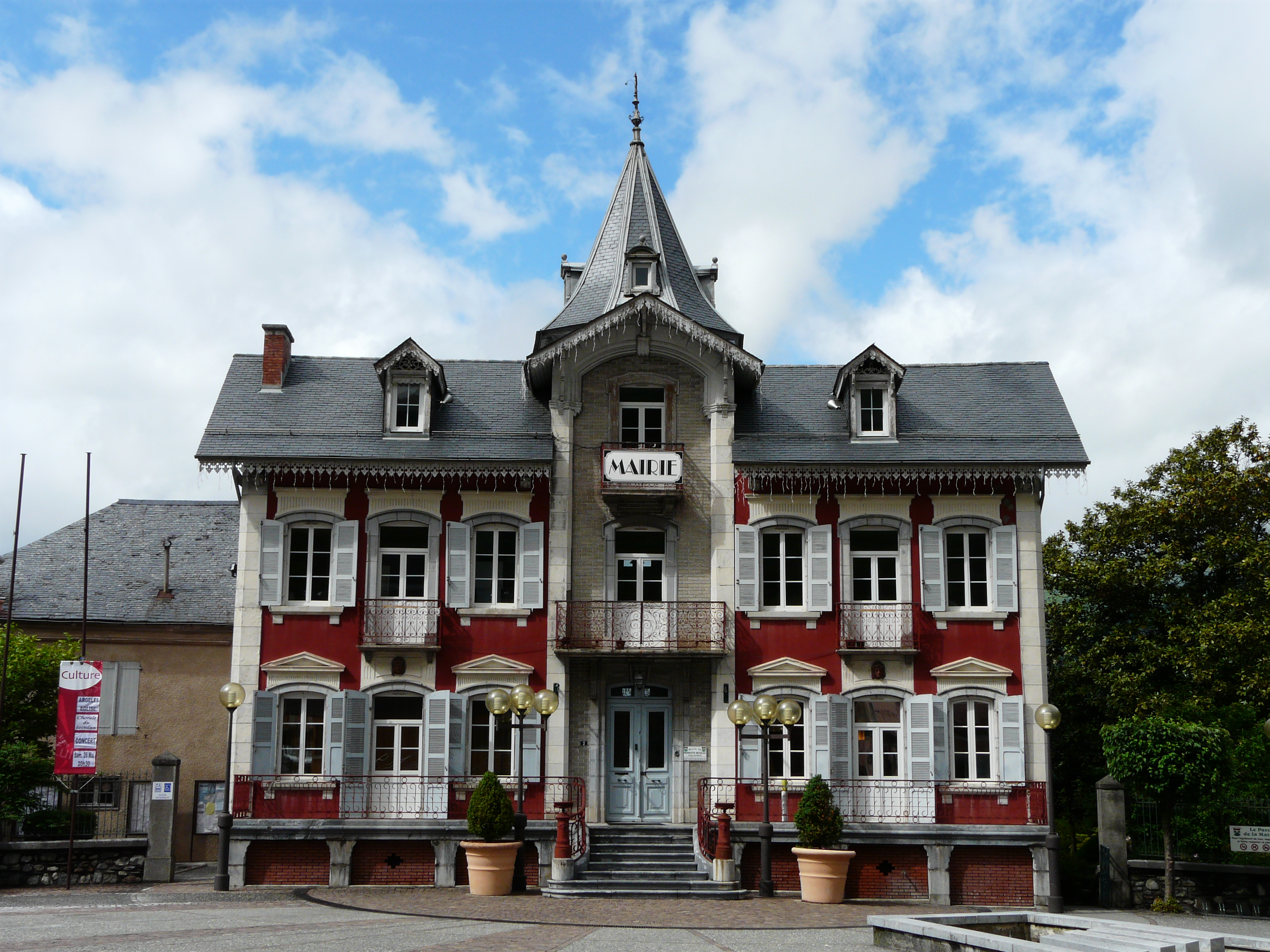
- The town hall

- Coat of arms
- Location of Pierrefitte-Nestalas
- Location within France Location within Occitanie
- Coordinates: 42°57′43″N 0°04′21″W
- Country: France
- Region: Occitania
- Department: Hautes-Pyrénées
- Arrondissement: Argelès-Gazost
- Canton: La Vallée des Gaves
- Intercommunality: Pyrénées Vallées des Gaves

Government
  - Mayor (2020–2026): Noël Pereira da Cunha
- Area^{1}: 1.76 km^{2} (0.68 sq mi)
- Elevation: 480 m (1,570 ft)
- Highest elevation: 701 m (2,300 ft)
- Lowest elevation: 452 m (1,483 ft)
- Population (2023): 1,092
  - Density: 620/km^{2} (1,610/sq mi)
- Time zone: UTC+01:00 (CET)
  - Summer (DST): UTC+02:00 (CEST)
- INSEE/Postal code: 65362 /65260
- ^{1} French Land Register data, which excludes lakes, ponds, glaciers > 1 km^{2} (0.386 sq mi or 247 acres) and river estuaries.

Pierrefitte-Nestalas is a commune in the Hautes-Pyrénées department in south-western France.

== Geography ==
Pierrefitte-Nestalas is in the southern part of the Lavedan valley in the central French Pyrenees mountains. It is at the point of confluence of the Gave de Gavarnie and the Gave de Cauterets torrents, which converge to become the Gave de Pau. The town is surrounded by mountains such as the Hautacam and the Cabaliros. It is a necessary point of passage to gain access to either Cauterets or to the Pays Toy and Gavarnie beyond.

== History ==
The hamlet of Nestalas, with its medieval church, was a point along the ancient road leading from the Abbey of Saint-Savin up the Gave de Gavarnie to the thermal site of Luz-Saint-Sauveur.

The town later gained some measure of local prominence due to its position, and due to the abundance of water to power small mills. Thanks to hydro power, industrial activities such as chemical manufacturing, aluminum smelting and power generation were developed in Pierrefitte-Nestalas and the adjacent town of Soulom during the course of the twentieth century. This was also responsible for bringing the railroad to town.

Most of the large industrial facilities were closed or reconverted at the end of the twentieth century and the railroad line was closed. Today, many inhabitants work in Lourdes or other nearby towns. Tourism is central to the town's economy. Pierefitte-Nestalas also houses a mountain rescue unit.

== See also ==
- Communes of the Hautes-Pyrénées department
