= Viger, Hautes-Pyrénées =

Viger
- Commune
- Coat of arms
- Location of Viger
- Location within France Location within Occitanie
- Coordinates: 43°03′47″N 0°02′51″W
- Country: France
- Region: Occitania
- Department: Hautes-Pyrénées
- Arrondissement: Argelès-Gazost
- Canton: Lourdes-1
- Intercommunality: CA Tarbes-Lourdes-Pyrénées
- Area^{1}: 3.37 km^{2} (1.30 sq mi)
- Elevation: 600 m (2,000 ft)
- Highest elevation: 1,160 m (3,810 ft)
- Lowest elevation: 385 m (1,263 ft)
- Population (2023): 141
  - Density: 41.8/km^{2} (108/sq mi)
- Time zone: UTC+01:00 (CET)
  - Summer (DST): UTC+02:00 (CEST)
- INSEE/Postal code: 65470 /65100
- ^{1} French Land Register data, which excludes lakes, ponds, glaciers > 1 km^{2} (0.386 sq mi or 247 acres) and river estuaries.

Viger is a commune in the Hautes-Pyrénées department in south-western France.

Historically and culturally, the commune is in the province of Lavedan, the south-western part of Bigorre and made up of a set of seven valleys upstream of the town of Lourdes. Exposed to an altered oceanic climate, it is drained by various small rivers. The commune has a remarkable natural heritage: two Natura 2000 sites (the “gaves de Pau and Cauterets (and gorge of Cauterets)” and “granquet-Pibeste and Soum d’Ech”), a protected area (the regional nature reserve of Pibeste-Aoulhet massif) and three natural areas of ecological, fauna and flora interest.

Viger is a rural commune which had 144 inhabitants in 2021, after experiencing a sharp increase in population since 1962. It is in the agglomeration of Lourdes and is part of the Lourdes catchment area. Its inhabitants are called the Vigérois or Vigéroises.

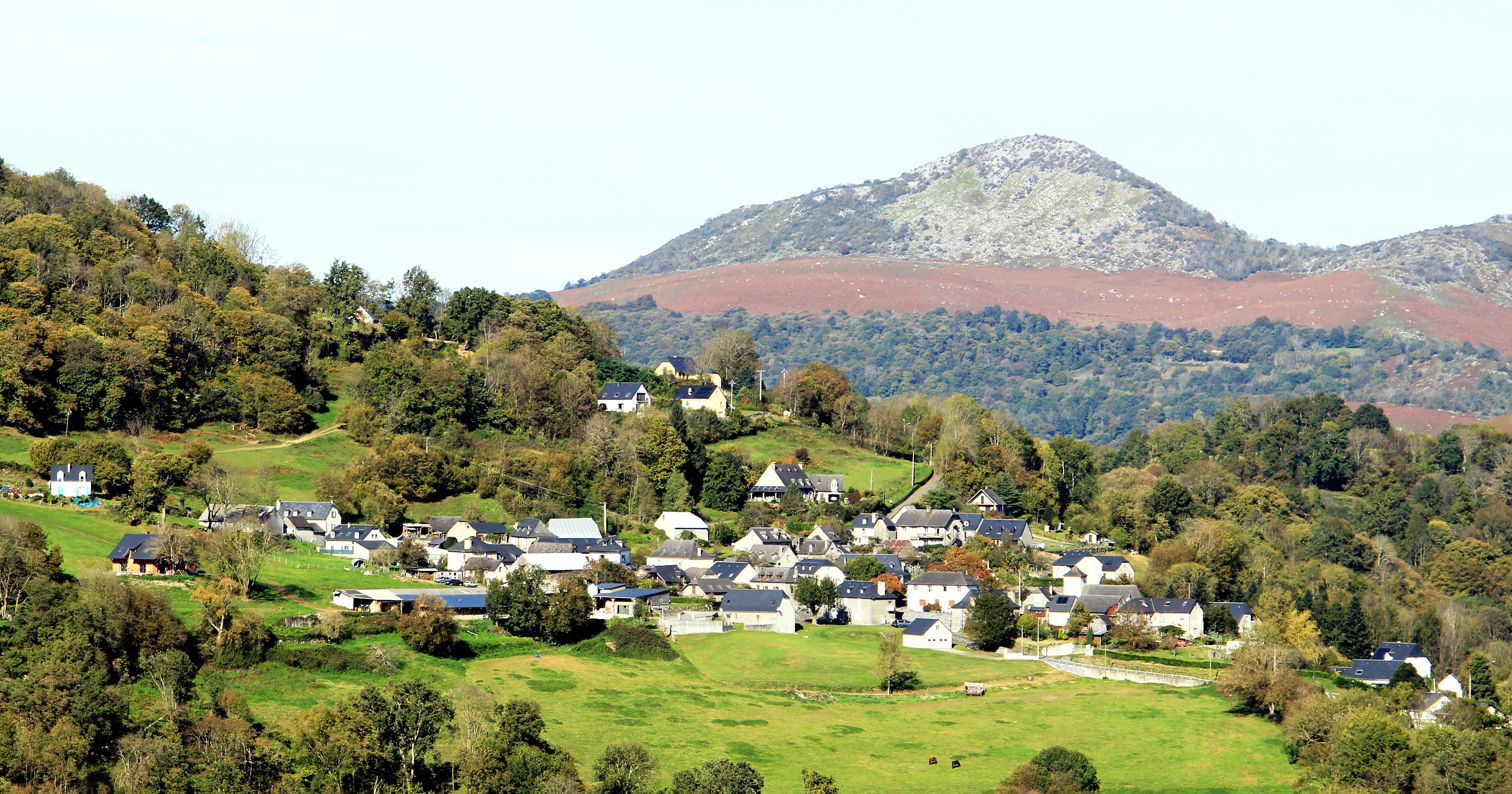

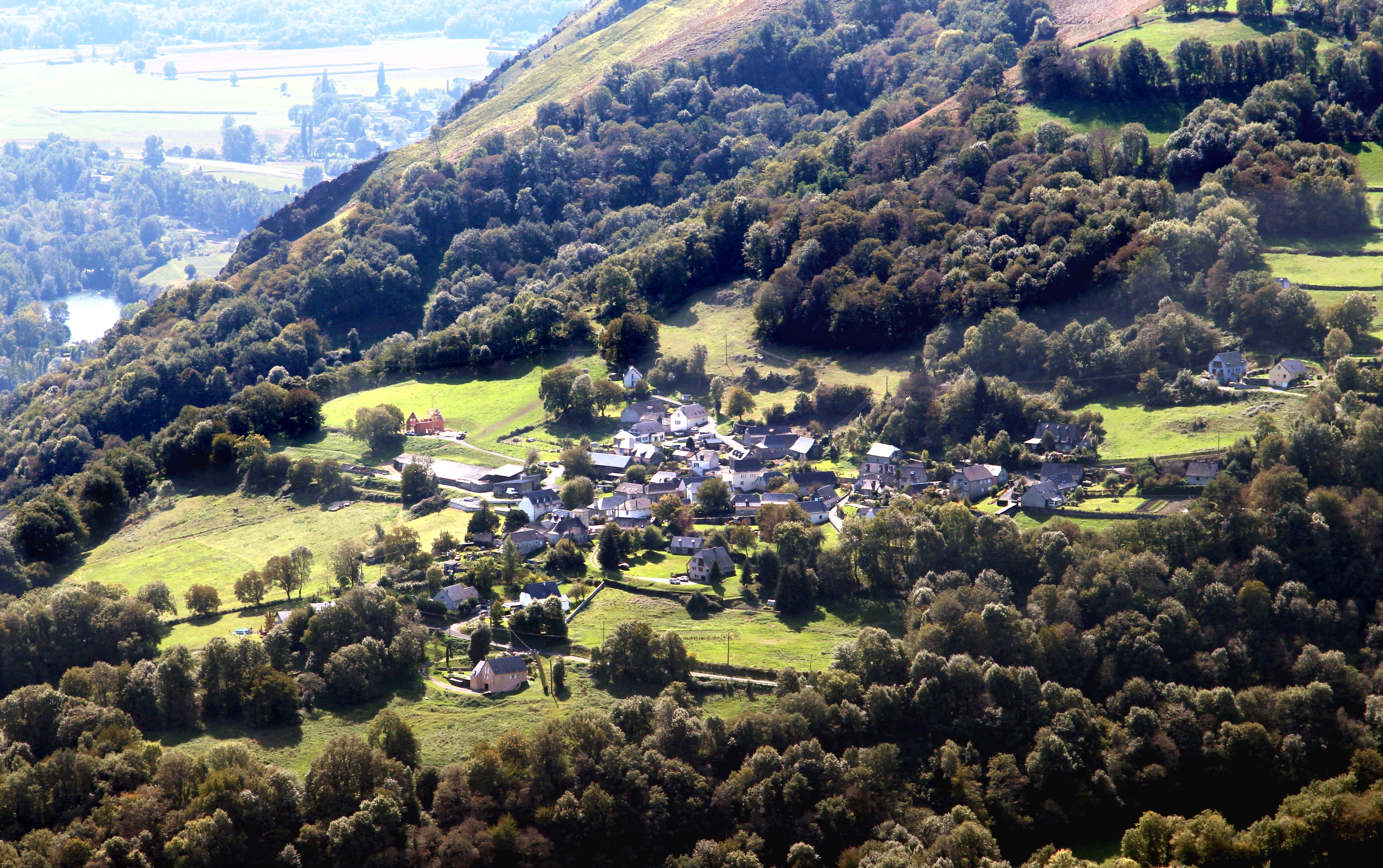

== See also ==
- Communes of the Hautes-Pyrénées department
