= Aspin-en-Lavedan =

- Commune
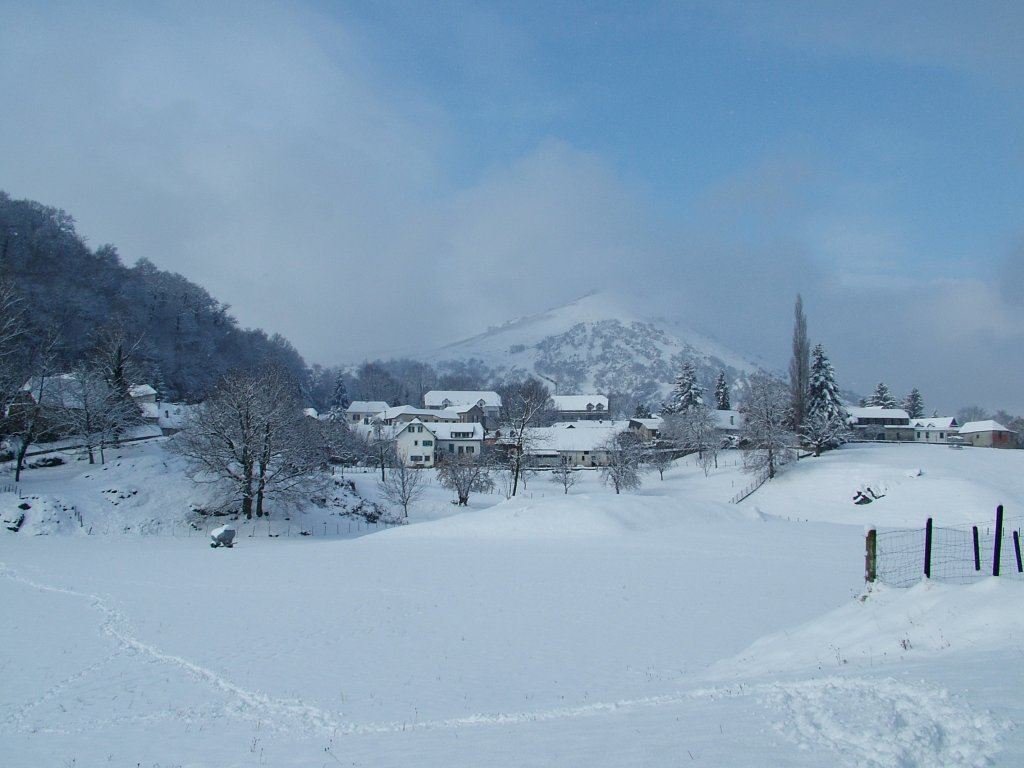
- Aspin-en-Lavedan in winter

- Coat of arms
- Location of Aspin-en-Lavedan
- Location within France Location within Occitanie
- Coordinates: 43°04′34″N 0°02′45″W
- Country: France
- Region: Occitania
- Department: Hautes-Pyrénées
- Arrondissement: Argelès-Gazost
- Canton: Lourdes-1
- Intercommunality: CA Tarbes-Lourdes-Pyrénées

Government
  - Mayor (2020–2026): André Laborde
- Area^{1}: 1.77 km^{2} (0.68 sq mi)
- Elevation: 500 m (1,600 ft)
- Highest elevation: 622 m (2,041 ft)
- Lowest elevation: 370 m (1,210 ft)
- Population (2023): 294
  - Density: 166/km^{2} (430/sq mi)
- Time zone: UTC+01:00 (CET)
  - Summer (DST): UTC+02:00 (CEST)
- INSEE/Postal code: 65040 /65100
- ^{1} French Land Register data, which excludes lakes, ponds, glaciers > 1 km^{2} (0.386 sq mi or 247 acres) and river estuaries.

Aspin-en-Lavedan (French pronunciation: [aspɛ̃ ɑ̃ lavdɑ̃], literally Aspin in Lavedan; Occitan: Aspin, before 1962: Aspin) is a commune in the Hautes-Pyrénées department in southwestern France.

== Population ==
Historical population
Year	Pop.	±% p.a.
1968	173	—
1975	227	+3.96%
1982	257	+1.79%
1990	256	−0.05%
1999	223	−1.52%
2007	235	+0.66%
2012	261	+2.12%
2017	334	+5.06%
2023	294	−2.10%
Source: INSEE

== See also ==
- Communes of the Hautes-Pyrénées department
