= Sère-en-Lavedan =

- Commune
- Coat of arms
- Location of Sère-en-Lavedan
- Location within France Location within Occitanie
- Coordinates: 43°01′20″N 0°07′14″W
- Country: France
- Region: Occitania
- Department: Hautes-Pyrénées
- Arrondissement: Argelès-Gazost
- Canton: La Vallée des Gaves
- Intercommunality: Pyrénées Vallées des Gaves

Government
  - Mayor (2020–2026): Joël Pedarribes
- Area^{1}: 1.87 km^{2} (0.72 sq mi)
- Elevation: 650 m (2,130 ft)
- Highest elevation: 887 m (2,910 ft)
- Lowest elevation: 524 m (1,719 ft)
- Population (2023): 86
  - Density: 46/km^{2} (120/sq mi)
- Time zone: UTC+01:00 (CET)
  - Summer (DST): UTC+02:00 (CEST)
- INSEE/Postal code: 65420 /65400
- ^{1} French Land Register data, which excludes lakes, ponds, glaciers > 1 km^{2} (0.386 sq mi or 247 acres) and river estuaries.

Sère-en-Lavedan (French pronunciation: [sɛʁ ɑ̃ lavdɑ̃], literally Sère in Lavedan; Occitan: Cèra, before 1962: Sère) is a commune in the Hautes-Pyrénées department in south-western France.

== See also ==
- Communes of the Hautes-Pyrénées department
