= Funiculaire du pic du Jer =

Funicular railway in France

Coordinates: 43°5′1″N 0°2′39″W

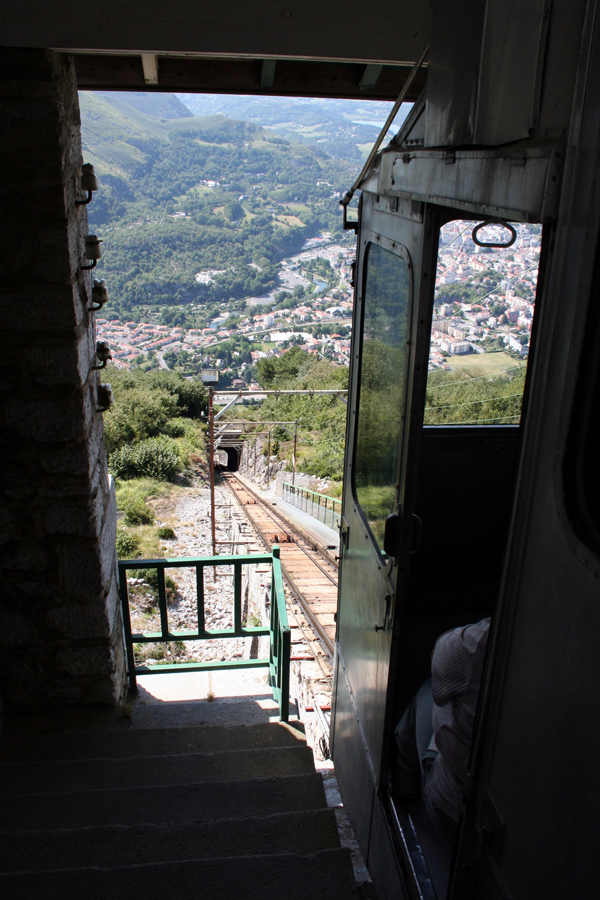
The funiculaire du pic du Jer

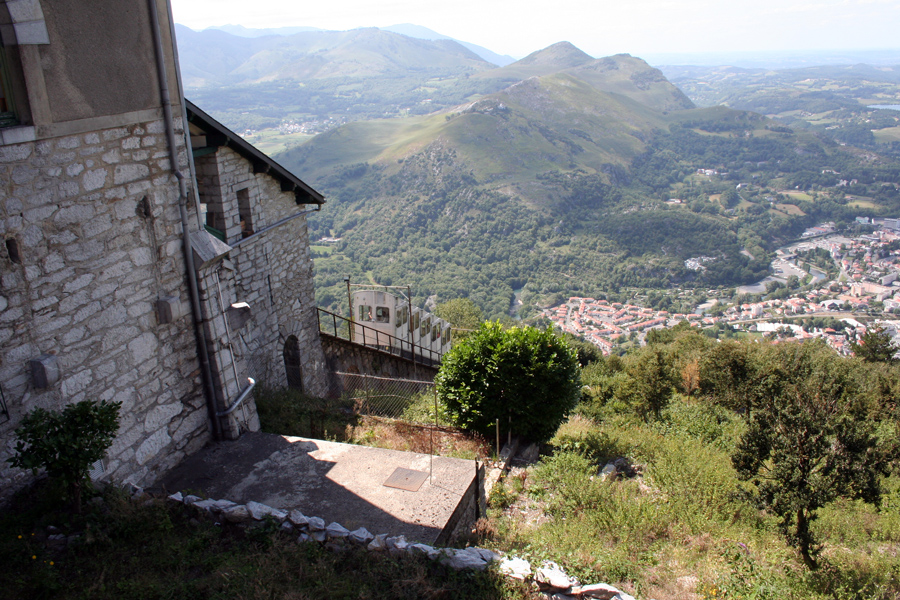
The funicular above Lourdes

The funiculaire du pic du Jer, or Pic du Jer funicular, is a funicular railway in the French département of Hautes-Pyrénées. It links the pilgrimage town of Lourdes with the summit of the nearby Pic du Jer. The funicular was constructed in 1900.

The funicular has the following technical parameters:

- Length: 1,100 metres (3,609 ft)
- Height: 473 metres (1,552 ft)
- Maximum steepness: 56 %
- Configuration: Single track with passing loop
- Journey time: 15 minutes
- Capacity: 80 passengers per car

== See also ==
- List of funicular railways
