= Pic du Jer =

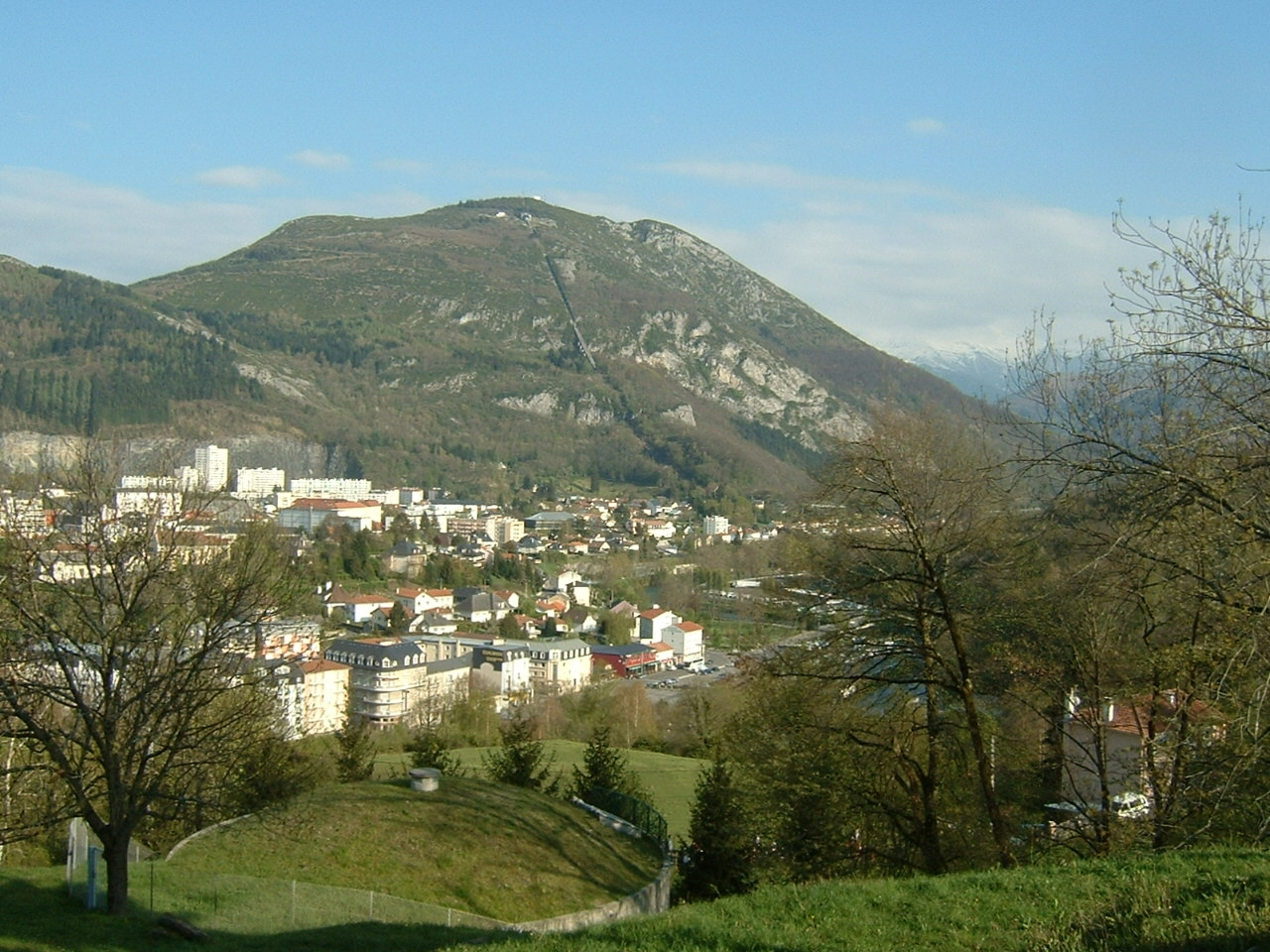
- View from the city of Lourdes

Highest point
- Elevation: 951 m (3,120 ft)
- Coordinates: 42°04′47″N 0°01′52″E

Geography
- Location within Pyrenees
- Location: Hautes-Pyrénées, Midi-Pyrénées, France
- Parent range: Pyrenees

The Pic du Jer is a summit in the Hautes-Pyrénées.

Located at 951 m (3,120 ft) metres above the city of Lourdes, it is recognizable by its big cross lit up at night.

== Access ==
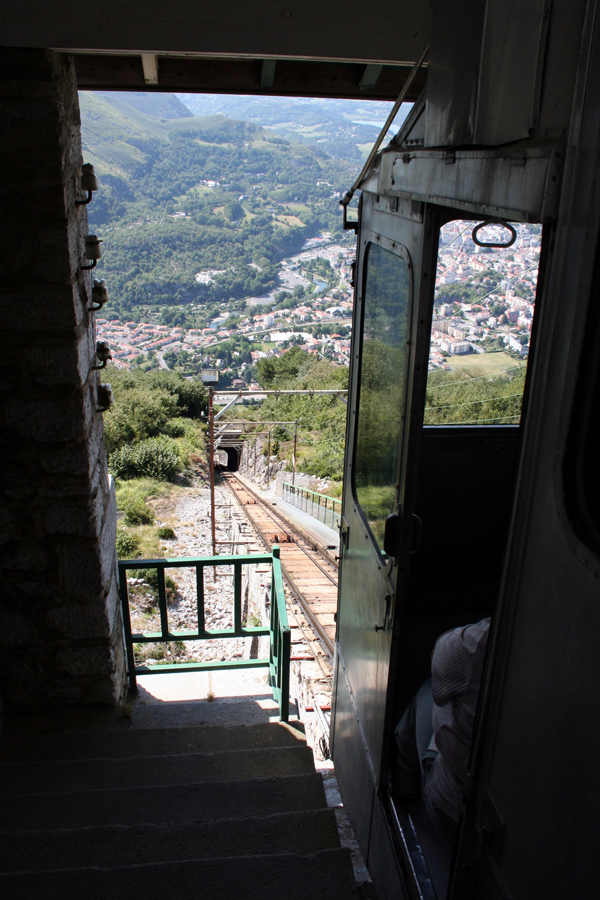
Pic du Jer Funicular

The mountain is accessible by funicular, which has been in operation since 1900. It transports passengers up to 950 m high, which follows a 1,100 m (3,600 ft) long route, on a slope varying from 27% (right at the beginning) to 56%. The route separates in two in the middle to enable the two trains to pass. It travels through two tunnels and over a viaduct, which can be seen from distance, such as from the route linking Lourdes to Argelès (Argelès-Lourdes direction). The lower station is accessible near the route (indicated by arrows from the southern Lourdes exit roundabout). One can also get to it by bus from the town-centre.

The 15-minute-long journeys (1.20 m/s) are usually every 30 minutes. The wagons hold 80 passengers (40 seated). From March to September, the funicular operates from 9:30 to 18:30, while only operating afternoons during the rest of the year.

At the higher station, there are several paths leading to the summit. There is a fast food and drink outlet near the station, with terraced benches and wonderful views of Lourdes, the mountain peaks and the surrounding area.

The main path has a few sheltered benches. Near the summit, the quality of the paths reduces considerably, but one can reach the summit without any real difficulty for a fairly fit and agile person. From the observatory, situated on the peak, an exceptional panorama awaits the visitor: Lourdes, the Lavedan and Argelès-Gazost, Tarbes, Lannemezan, Pau and the whole central mountain range of the Pyrenees (with orientation board). However, the observatory is in an abandoned state, as is the rest of the equipment on the summit, but this does not take anything away from the quality of the panorama.

The pic du Jer is also a hiking and climbing stead. The start of a downhill permanent mountain bike slope is at the foot of the station of arrival.
