= Arras-en-Lavedan =

- Commune
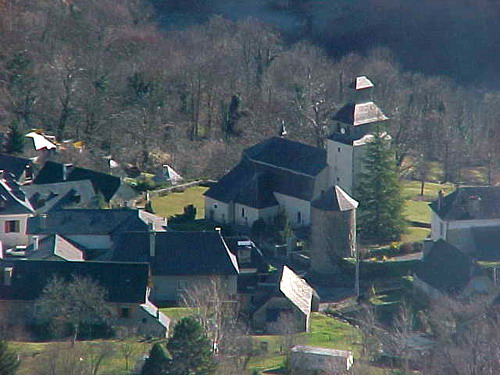
- The commune viewed from the Col d'Arras

- Coat of arms
- Location of Arras-en-Lavedan
- Location within France Location within Occitanie
- Coordinates: 42°59′35″N 0°07′33″W
- Country: France
- Region: Occitania
- Department: Hautes-Pyrénées
- Arrondissement: Argelès-Gazost
- Canton: La Vallée des Gaves
- Intercommunality: Pyrénées Vallées des Gaves

Government
  - Mayor (2020–2026): Charles Legrand
- Area^{1}: 24.66 km^{2} (9.52 sq mi)
- Elevation: 695 m (2,280 ft)
- Highest elevation: 2,288 m (7,507 ft)
- Lowest elevation: 509 m (1,670 ft)
- Population (2023): 501
  - Density: 20.3/km^{2} (52.6/sq mi)
- Time zone: UTC+01:00 (CET)
  - Summer (DST): UTC+02:00 (CEST)
- INSEE/Postal code: 65029 /65400
- ^{1} French Land Register data, which excludes lakes, ponds, glaciers > 1 km^{2} (0.386 sq mi or 247 acres) and river estuaries.

Arras-en-Lavedan (French pronunciation: [aʁas ɑ̃ lavdɑ̃], literally Arras in Lavedan; Occitan: Arràs) is a commune in the Hautes-Pyrénées department in southwestern France.

== Population ==
Historical population
Year	Pop.	±% p.a.
1968	455	—
1975	402	−1.75%
1982	418	+0.56%
1990	418	+0.00%
1999	456	+0.97%
2007	525	+1.78%
2012	515	−0.38%
2017	489	−1.03%
2023	501	+0.40%
Source: INSEE

== See also ==
- Communes of the Hautes-Pyrénées department
