= Vizos =

- Part of Saligos
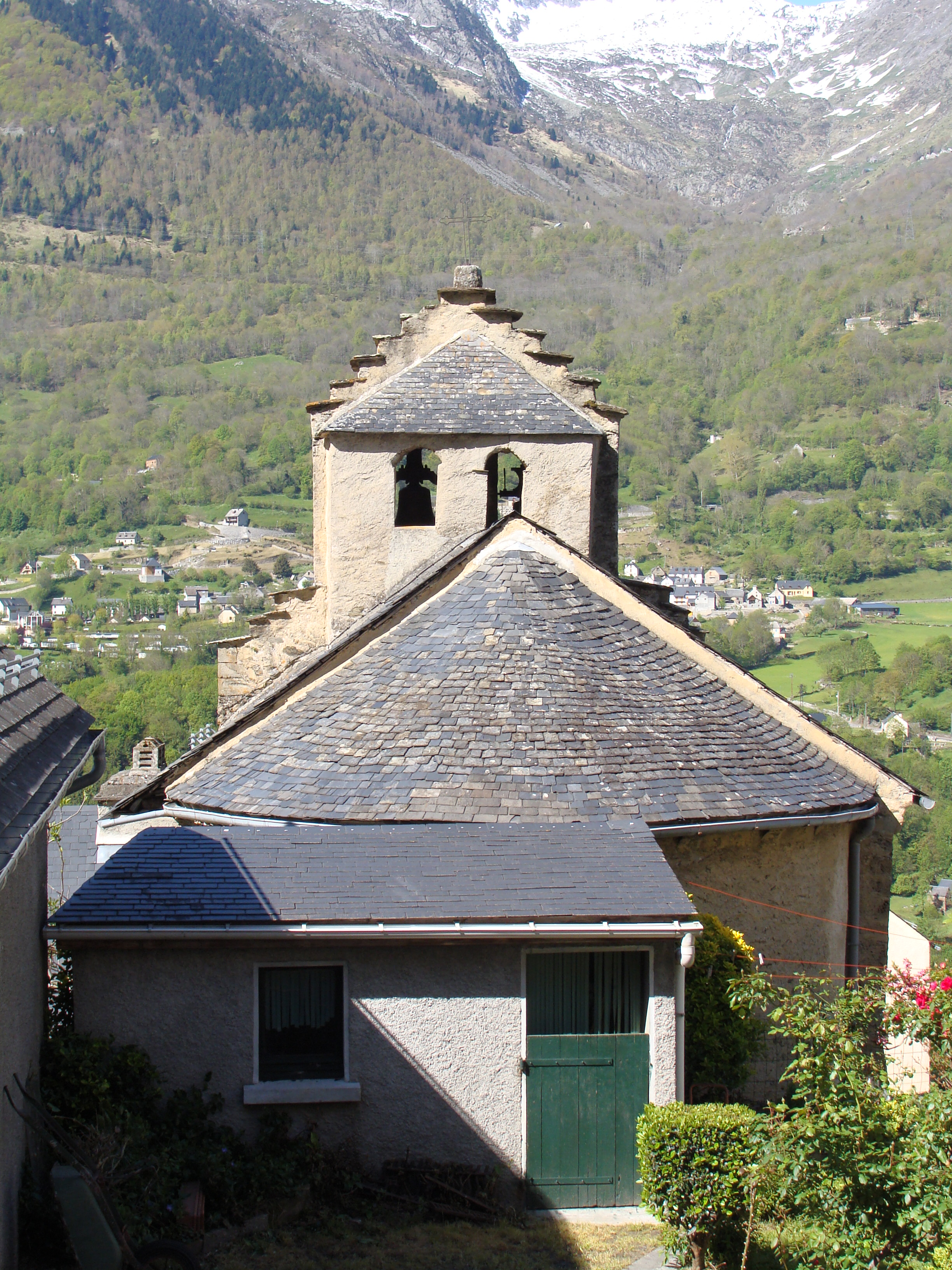
- The church of Vizos

- Coat of arms
- Location of Vizos
- Location within France Location within Occitanie
- Coordinates: 42°53′28″N 0°00′45″W
- Country: France
- Region: Occitania
- Department: Hautes-Pyrénées
- Arrondissement: Argelès-Gazost
- Canton: La Vallée des Gaves
- Commune: Saligos
- Area^{1}: 2.56 km^{2} (0.99 sq mi)
- Elevation: 750 m (2,460 ft)
- Highest elevation: 2,163 m (7,096 ft)
- Lowest elevation: 705 m (2,313 ft)
- Population (2014): 36
  - Density: 14/km^{2} (36/sq mi)
- Time zone: UTC+01:00 (CET)
  - Summer (DST): UTC+02:00 (CEST)
- Postal code: 65120
- ^{1} French Land Register data, which excludes lakes, ponds, glaciers > 1 km^{2} (0.386 sq mi or 247 acres) and river estuaries.

Vizos (French pronunciation: [vizɔs]; Gascon: Visòs) is a former commune in the Hautes-Pyrénées department in south-western France. On 1 January 2017, it was merged into the commune Saligos.

== See also ==
- Communes of the Hautes-Pyrénées department
