= Arrens-Marsous =

- Commune
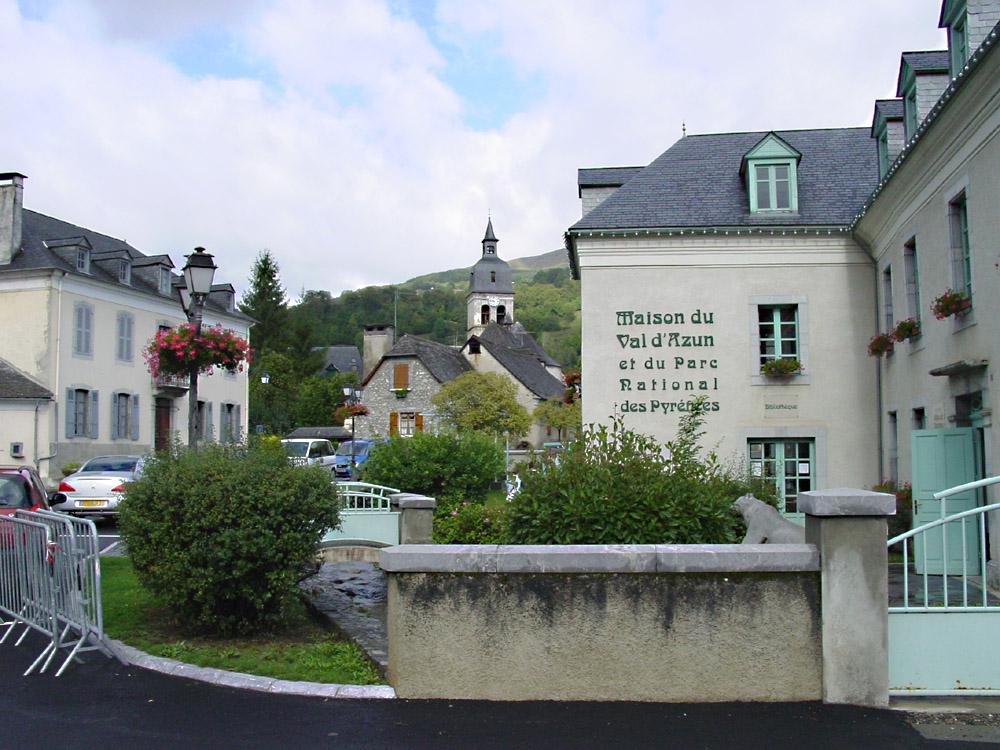
- The centre of the village

- Coat of arms
- Location of Arrens-Marsous
- Location within France Location within Occitanie
- Coordinates: 42°57′23″N 0°12′42″W
- Country: France
- Region: Occitania
- Department: Hautes-Pyrénées
- Arrondissement: Argelès-Gazost
- Canton: La Vallée des Gaves
- Intercommunality: Pyrénées Vallées des Gaves

Government
  - Mayor (2020–2026): Jean-Pierre Cazaux
- Area^{1}: 100.55 km^{2} (38.82 sq mi)
- Highest elevation: 3,144 m (10,315 ft)
- Lowest elevation: 720 m (2,360 ft)
- Population (2023): 694
  - Density: 6.90/km^{2} (17.9/sq mi)
- Time zone: UTC+01:00 (CET)
  - Summer (DST): UTC+02:00 (CEST)
- INSEE/Postal code: 65032 /65400
- ^{1} French Land Register data, which excludes lakes, ponds, glaciers > 1 km^{2} (0.386 sq mi or 247 acres) and river estuaries.

Arrens-Marsous (French pronunciation: [aʁɛ̃s maʁsus]; Occitan: Arrens e Marçós) is a commune in the Hautes-Pyrénées department in southwestern France. It was created in 1973 by the merger of two former communes: Arrens and Marsous.

In the village, the Maison du Val d'Azun is an information centre and small museum of the area.

== Geography ==
=== Climate ===
Arrens-Marsous has an oceanic climate (Köppen climate classification Cfb). The average annual temperature in Arrens-Marsous is 9.9 °C (49.8 °F). The average annual rainfall is 1,146.3 mm (45.13 in) with November as the wettest month. The temperatures are highest on average in July, at around 17.0 °C (62.6 °F), and lowest in January, at around 3.4 °C (38.1 °F). The highest temperature ever recorded in Arrens-Marsous was 36.5 °C (97.7 °F) on 20 July 1989; the coldest temperature ever recorded was −17.0 °C (1.4 °F) on 14 January 1985.

Climate data for Arrens-Marsous (1981−2010 normals, extremes 1936−2015)
Month	Jan	Feb	Mar	Apr	May	Jun	Jul	Aug	Sep	Oct	Nov	Dec	Year
Record high °C (°F)	22.5 (72.5)	22.0 (71.6)	23.3 (73.9)	27.0 (80.6)	29.3 (84.7)	35.0 (95.0)	36.5 (97.7)	35.0 (95.0)	32.5 (90.5)	29.0 (84.2)	25.0 (77.0)	23.5 (74.3)	36.5 (97.7)
Mean daily maximum °C (°F)	7.3 (45.1)	8.7 (47.7)	11.4 (52.5)	12.6 (54.7)	16.3 (61.3)	19.9 (67.8)	22.2 (72.0)	22.2 (72.0)	19.5 (67.1)	16.0 (60.8)	10.5 (50.9)	7.2 (45.0)	14.5 (58.1)
Daily mean °C (°F)	3.4 (38.1)	4.3 (39.7)	6.6 (43.9)	8.0 (46.4)	11.5 (52.7)	14.8 (58.6)	17.0 (62.6)	16.9 (62.4)	14.4 (57.9)	11.3 (52.3)	6.6 (43.9)	3.8 (38.8)	9.9 (49.8)
Mean daily minimum °C (°F)	−0.4 (31.3)	0.0 (32.0)	1.8 (35.2)	3.4 (38.1)	6.7 (44.1)	9.7 (49.5)	11.7 (53.1)	11.7 (53.1)	9.2 (48.6)	6.5 (43.7)	2.6 (36.7)	0.3 (32.5)	5.3 (41.5)
Record low °C (°F)	−17.0 (1.4)	−15.0 (5.0)	−13.0 (8.6)	−6.0 (21.2)	−5.0 (23.0)	1.2 (34.2)	4.0 (39.2)	−1.0 (30.2)	−5.0 (23.0)	−7.0 (19.4)	−10.0 (14.0)	−11.5 (11.3)	−17.0 (1.4)
Average precipitation mm (inches)	108.2 (4.26)	79.9 (3.15)	87.6 (3.45)	115.1 (4.53)	107.7 (4.24)	81.9 (3.22)	73.3 (2.89)	76.4 (3.01)	83.5 (3.29)	95.3 (3.75)	121.5 (4.78)	115.9 (4.56)	1,146.3 (45.13)
Average precipitation days (≥ 1.0 mm)	10.9	9.7	10.8	13.4	14.4	10.7	9.2	9.4	9.4	10.9	11.7	11.6	132.2
Source: Météo-France

== Population ==
Historical population
Year	Pop.	±% p.a.
1968	782	—
1975	726	−1.06%
1982	711	−0.30%
1990	721	+0.17%
1999	697	−0.38%
2007	773	+1.30%
2012	723	−1.33%
2017	727	+0.11%
2023	694	−0.77%
Source: INSEE

== See also ==
- GR 10 footpath
- Communes of the Hautes-Pyrénées department
