= Ayros-Arbouix =

- Commune
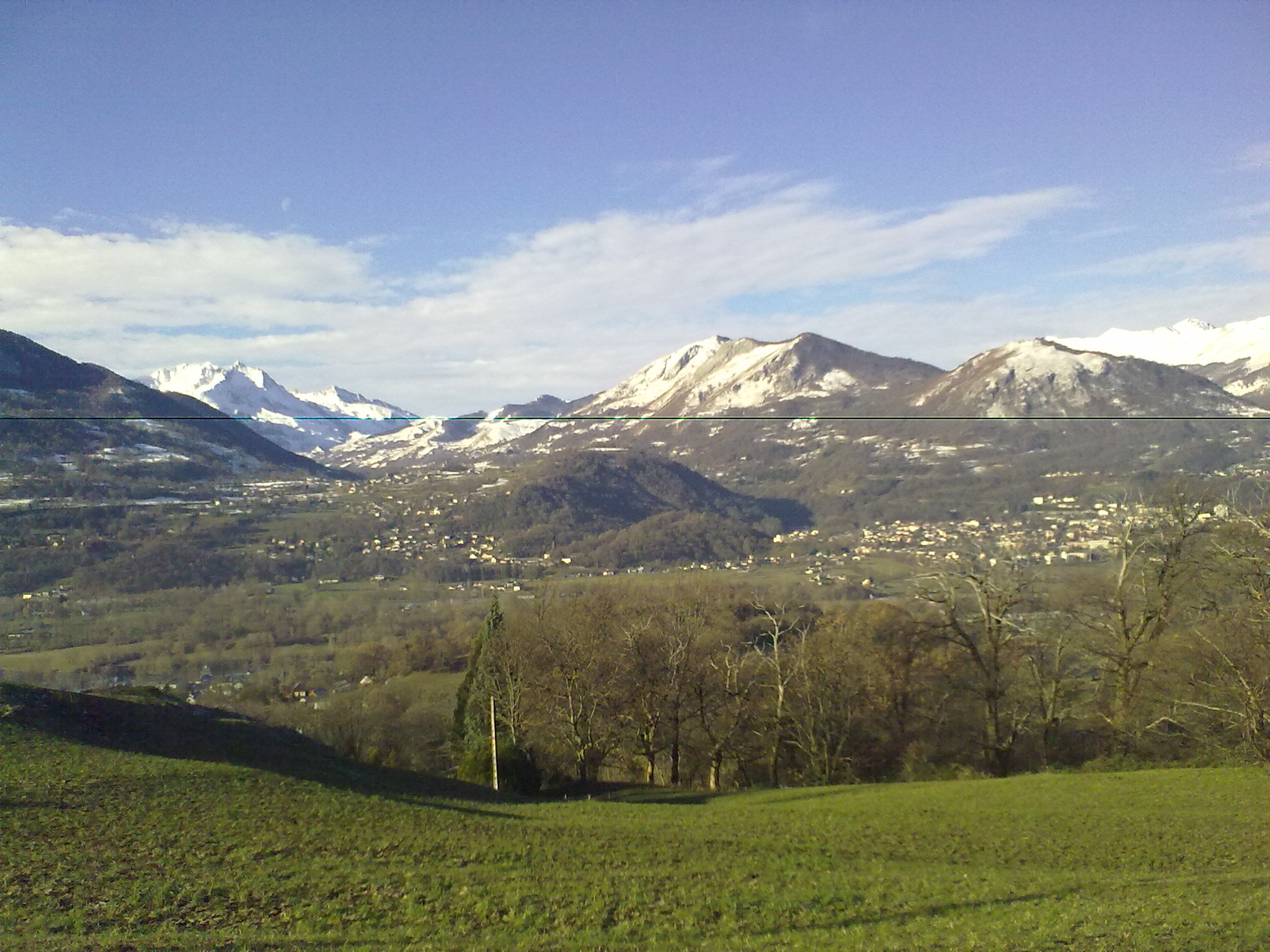
- View of the Mountains from Arbouix

- Coat of arms
- Location of Ayros-Arbouix
- Location within France Location within Occitanie
- Coordinates: 43°00′20″N 0°03′52″W
- Country: France
- Region: Occitania
- Department: Hautes-Pyrénées
- Arrondissement: Argelès-Gazost
- Canton: La Vallée des Gaves
- Intercommunality: CC Pyrénées Vallées des Gaves

Government
  - Mayor (2020–2026): Régis Baudiffier
- Area^{1}: 2.72 km^{2} (1.05 sq mi)
- Elevation: 600 m (2,000 ft)
- Highest elevation: 880 m (2,890 ft)
- Lowest elevation: 418 m (1,371 ft)
- Population (2023): 349
  - Density: 128/km^{2} (332/sq mi)
- Time zone: UTC+01:00 (CET)
  - Summer (DST): UTC+02:00 (CEST)
- INSEE/Postal code: 65055 /65400
- ^{1} French Land Register data, which excludes lakes, ponds, glaciers > 1 km^{2} (0.386 sq mi or 247 acres) and river estuaries.

Ayros-Arbouix (French pronunciation: [aiʁɔs aʁbwiks]; Occitan: Airòs e Arboish) is a commune in the Hautes-Pyrénées department in the Occitanie region of south-western France.

== Geography ==
Ayros-Arbouix is part of the Pyrénées National Park and is located some 10 km south of Lourdes just east of Argelès-Gazost. Access to the commune is by road D821 from Lourdes which changes to the D913 at the commune border and passes down the western side of the commune continuing south to join the D921 near Villelongue. The D13 comes from Boô-Silhen in the north and passes through the centre of the commune before continuing south to Préchac. The D100 links the D821 to the D13 in the commune. Access to the village is by a country road east from the D13. Apart from the village there are the hamlets of Couture Bague south-west of the village and Arbouix in the south of the commune. The commune is mixed forest and farmland.

The Gave de Pau flows along the western border of the commune as it flows north to eventually join the Gave d'Oloron forming the Gaves Réunis at Peyrehorade. The Estau river flows west through the centre of the commune to join the Gave de Pau. The Ruisseau d'Aygueberden flows west through the south of the commune to join the Gave de Pau.

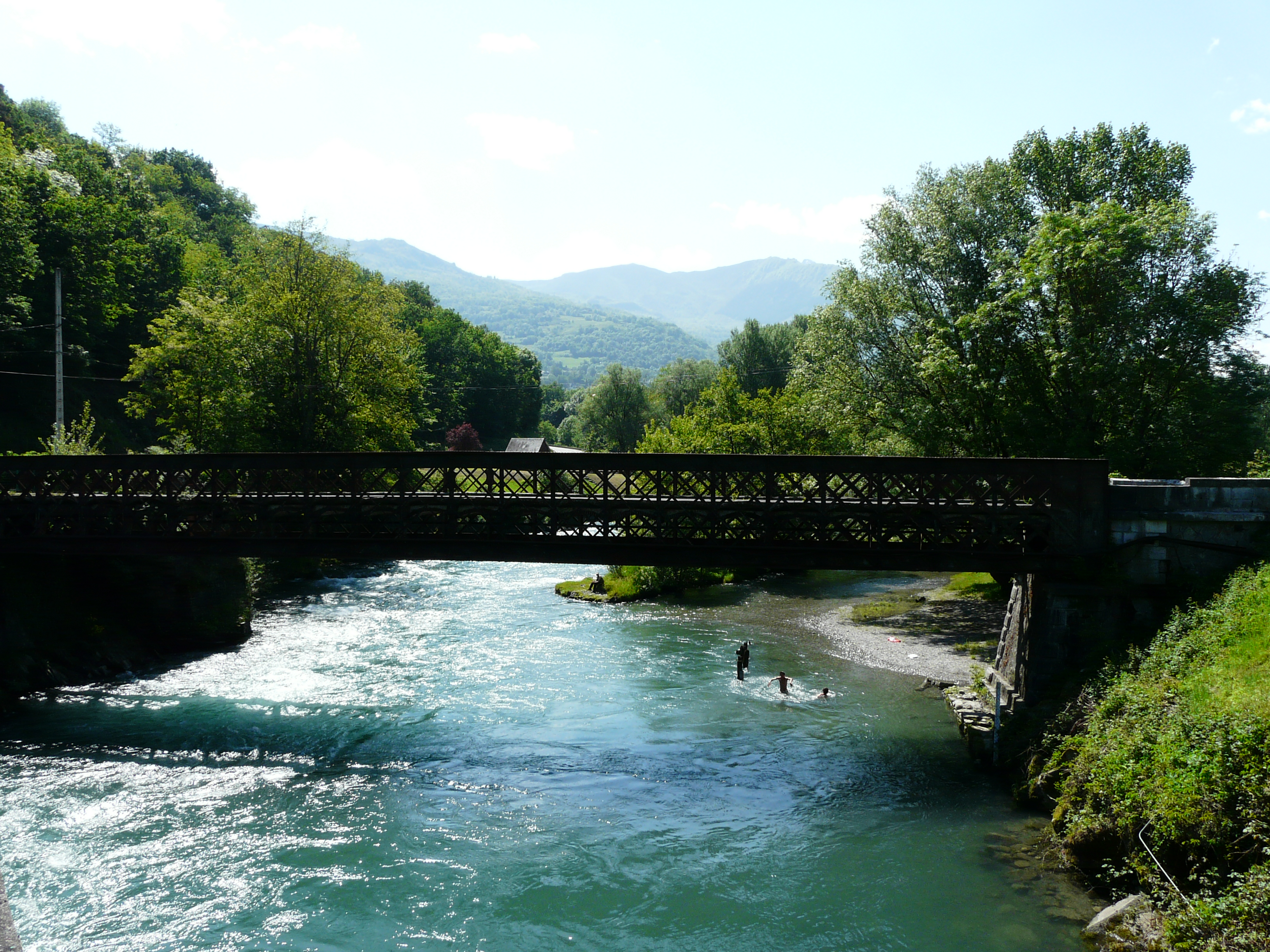
The Gave de Pau with the bridge from Ayros-Arbouix (left) to Argelès-Gazost

=== Heraldry ===
Arms of Ayros-Arbouix	These arms are faulty as they do not comply with the rule of tincture (Sable on Azure). Blazon: Azure, a fesse wavy enhanced of Argent, in chief the Arial letters AY to dexter and AR to sinister the same, in base a bow Sable stringed Gules and arrow notched Azure feathered and armed Or.

=== Climate ===
Ayros-Arbouix has an oceanic climate (Köppen climate classification Cfb). The average annual temperature in Ayros-Arbouix is 13.0 °C (55.4 °F). The average annual rainfall is 1,098.2 mm (43.24 in) with November as the wettest month. The temperatures are highest on average in August, at around 20.3 °C (68.5 °F), and lowest in January, at around 6.5 °C (43.7 °F). The highest temperature ever recorded in Ayros-Arbouix was 41.5 °C (106.7 °F) on 26 August 2010; the coldest temperature ever recorded was −17.5 °C (0.5 °F) on 9 January 1985.

Climate data for Ayros-Arbouix (1991−2020 normals, extremes 1982−present)
Month	Jan	Feb	Mar	Apr	May	Jun	Jul	Aug	Sep	Oct	Nov	Dec	Year
Record high °C (°F)	24.0 (75.2)	26.4 (79.5)	27.5 (81.5)	33.0 (91.4)	34.3 (93.7)	39.6 (103.3)	40.0 (104.0)	41.5 (106.7)	36.9 (98.4)	34.6 (94.3)	28.5 (83.3)	27.5 (81.5)	41.5 (106.7)
Mean daily maximum °C (°F)	11.2 (52.2)	11.8 (53.2)	14.9 (58.8)	16.4 (61.5)	20.0 (68.0)	23.3 (73.9)	25.4 (77.7)	25.9 (78.6)	22.8 (73.0)	19.4 (66.9)	14.2 (57.6)	11.7 (53.1)	18.1 (64.6)
Daily mean °C (°F)	6.5 (43.7)	6.9 (44.4)	9.7 (49.5)	11.3 (52.3)	14.8 (58.6)	18.0 (64.4)	20.0 (68.0)	20.3 (68.5)	17.3 (63.1)	14.3 (57.7)	9.5 (49.1)	7.3 (45.1)	13.0 (55.4)
Mean daily minimum °C (°F)	1.9 (35.4)	2.0 (35.6)	4.4 (39.9)	6.2 (43.2)	9.6 (49.3)	12.7 (54.9)	14.7 (58.5)	14.8 (58.6)	11.8 (53.2)	9.2 (48.6)	4.9 (40.8)	2.9 (37.2)	7.9 (46.2)
Record low °C (°F)	−17.5 (0.5)	−13.0 (8.6)	−10.0 (14.0)	−4.2 (24.4)	−1.5 (29.3)	3.0 (37.4)	6.0 (42.8)	4.0 (39.2)	2.0 (35.6)	−2.0 (28.4)	−9.0 (15.8)	−8.0 (17.6)	−17.5 (0.5)
Average precipitation mm (inches)	110.1 (4.33)	90.0 (3.54)	86.3 (3.40)	106.5 (4.19)	103.0 (4.06)	81.9 (3.22)	65.8 (2.59)	60.6 (2.39)	68.4 (2.69)	83.1 (3.27)	137.3 (5.41)	105.2 (4.14)	1,098.2 (43.24)
Average precipitation days (≥ 1.0 mm)	11.6	10.3	10.3	12.9	13.5	10.3	8.1	8.0	8.8	10.0	12.4	11.1	127.2
Source: Météo-France

== Administration ==
List of Successive Mayors

From	To	Name
1831	1831	Cazajous
1862	1862	Justin Nogue
1870	1870	Louis Cayrey
1965	1977	André Sempé
1977	1989	Louis Pédarribes
1989	2014	Jean Louis Pambrun
2014	2026	Régis Baudiffier

== Demography ==
The inhabitants of the commune are known as Aybouisois or Aybouisoises in French.

Historical population

Year	Pop.	±% p.a.
1793	148	—
1821	212	+1.29%
1846	380	+2.36%
1872	338	−0.45%
1901	266	−0.82%
1926	206	−1.02%
1946	206	+0.00%
1962	220	+0.41%
1968	228	+0.60%

Year	Pop.	±% p.a.
1975	235	+0.43%
1982	256	+1.23%
1990	230	−1.33%
1999	231	+0.05%
2007	316	+3.99%
2012	278	−2.53%
2017	314	+2.47%
2023	349	+1.78%

Source: EHESS and INSEE

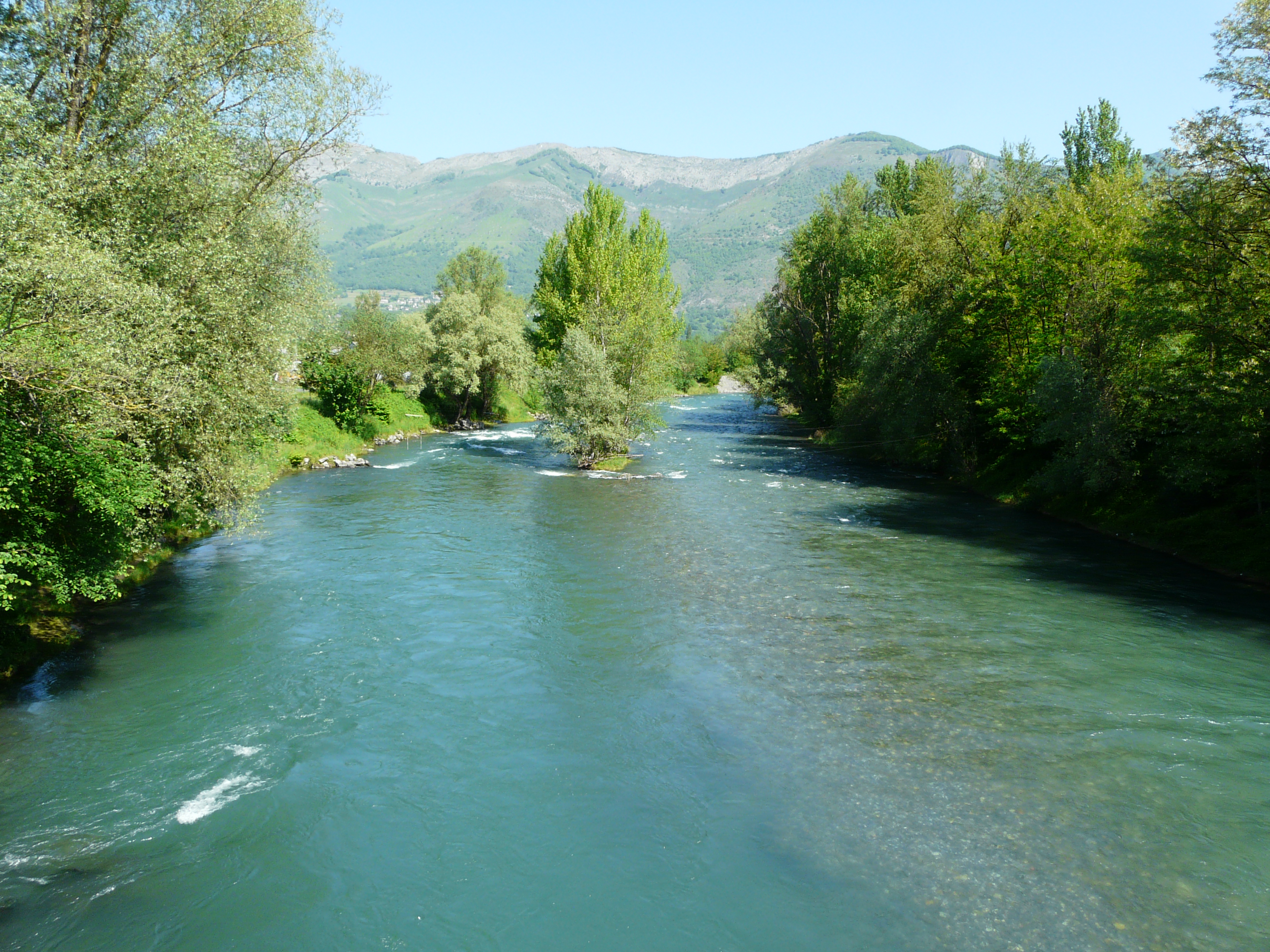
The Gave de Pau from the bridge

== Sports ==
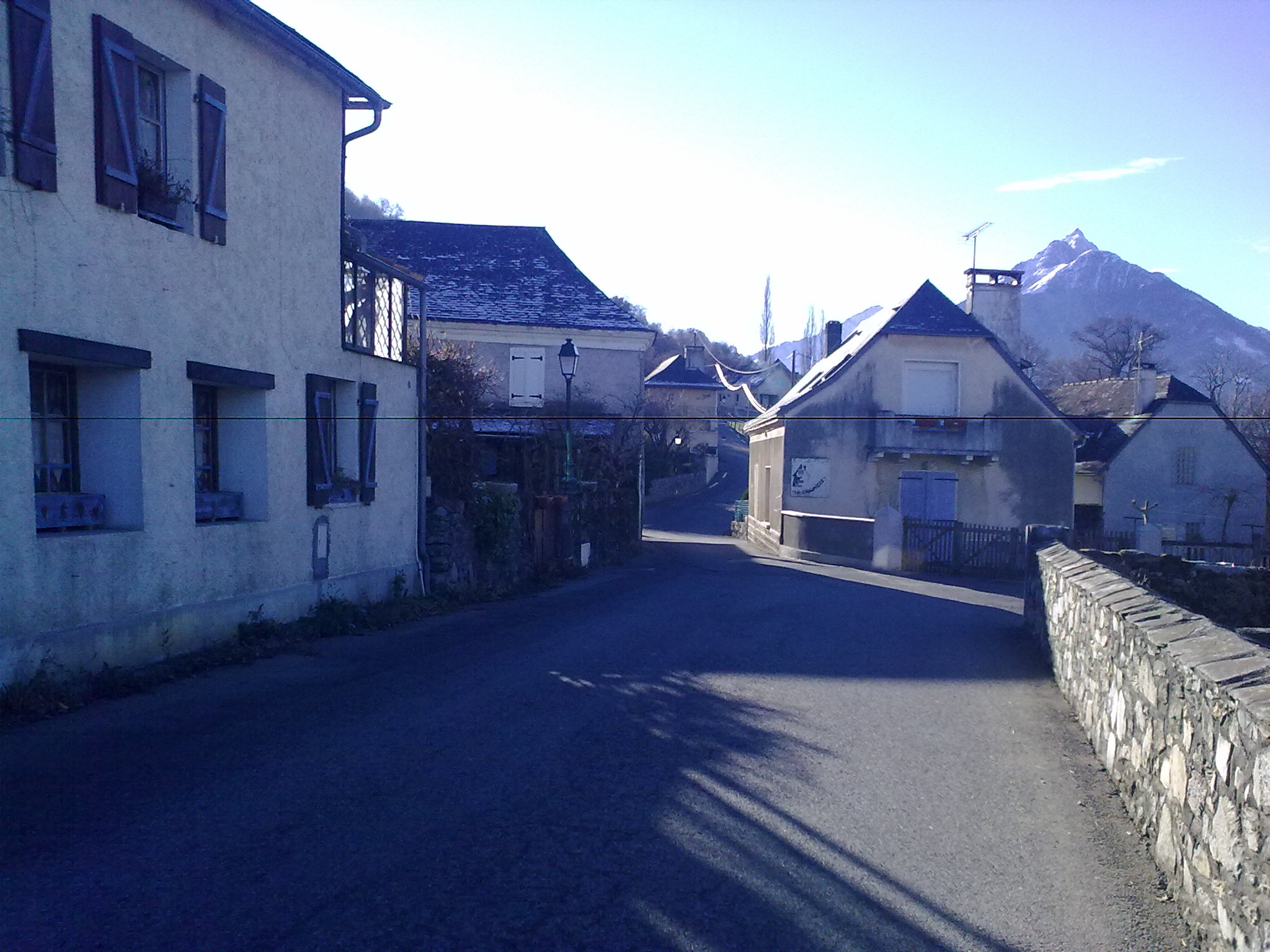
Arbouix village

The village has a green where Quilles de Neuf (Nine Bowls) is played.

== See also ==
- Communes of the Hautes-Pyrénées department
