= Saligos =

- Commune
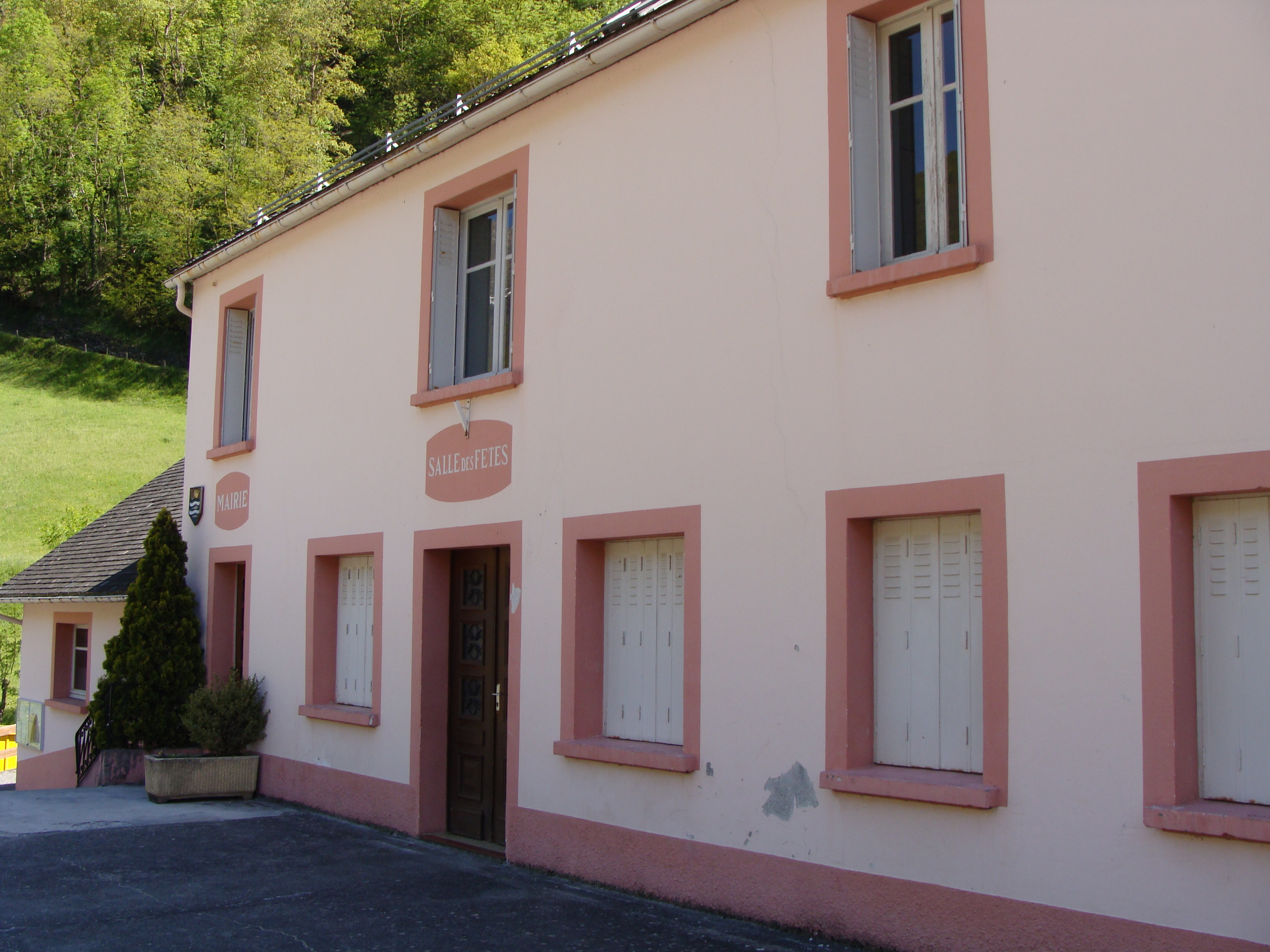
- The town hall

- Coat of arms
- Location of Saligos
- Location within France Location within Occitanie
- Coordinates: 42°53′37″N 0°01′10″W
- Country: France
- Region: Occitania
- Department: Hautes-Pyrénées
- Arrondissement: Argelès-Gazost
- Canton: La Vallée des Gaves
- Intercommunality: Pyrénées Vallées des Gaves

Government
  - Mayor (2020–2026): René Nadau
- Area^{1}: 7.07 km^{2} (2.73 sq mi)
- Elevation: 650 m (2,130 ft)
- Highest elevation: 2,390 m (7,840 ft)
- Lowest elevation: 596 m (1,955 ft)
- Population (2023): 88
  - Density: 12/km^{2} (32/sq mi)
- Time zone: UTC+01:00 (CET)
  - Summer (DST): UTC+02:00 (CEST)
- INSEE/Postal code: 65399 /65120
- ^{1} French Land Register data, which excludes lakes, ponds, glaciers > 1 km^{2} (0.386 sq mi or 247 acres) and river estuaries.

Saligos (French pronunciation: [saliɡɔs]; Occitan: Saligòs) is a commune in the Hautes-Pyrénées department in south-western France. On 1 January 2017, the former commune of Vizos was merged into Saligos.

== See also ==
- Communes of the Hautes-Pyrénées department
