= Préchac, Hautes-Pyrénées =

Préchac
- Commune
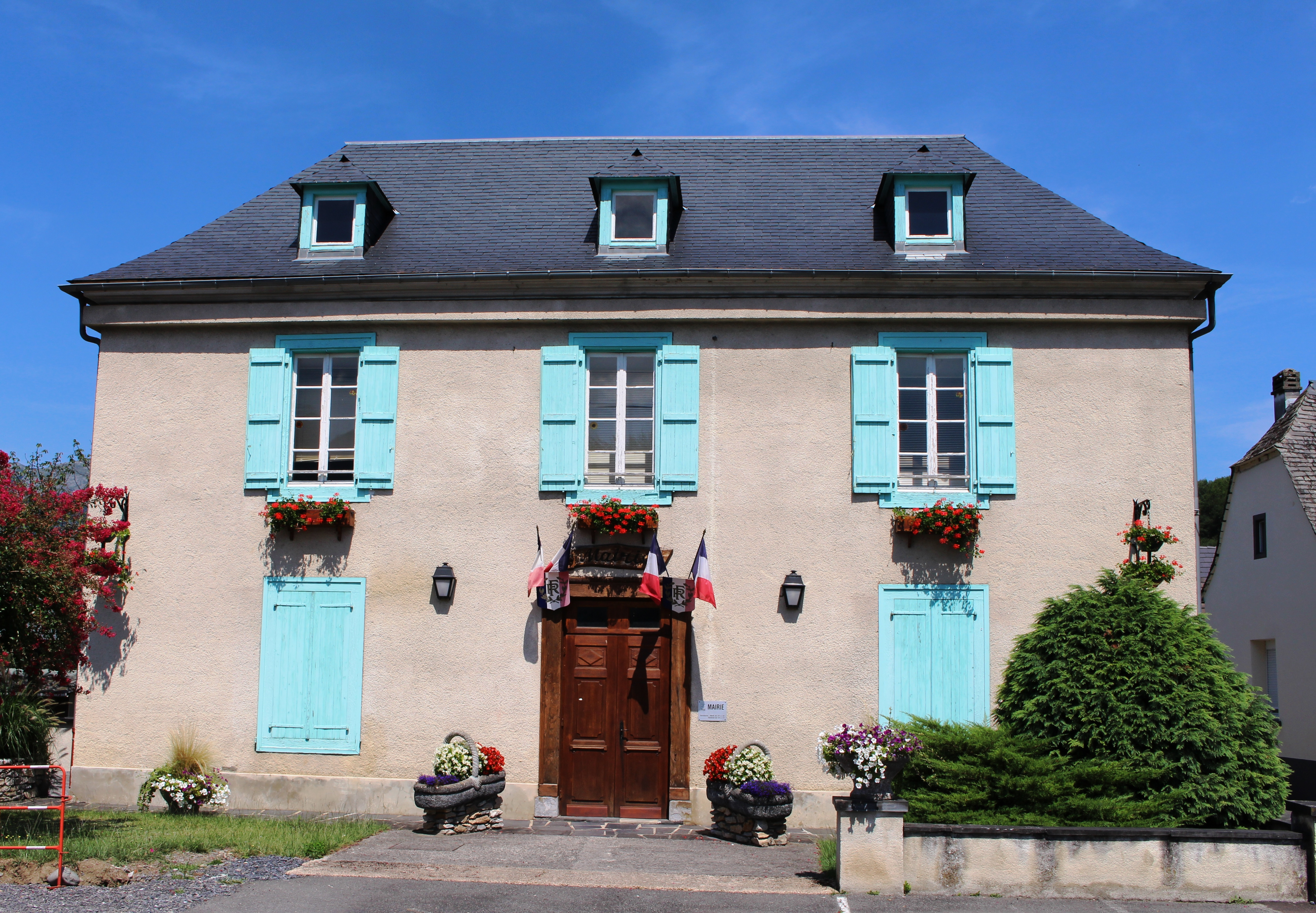
- Town hall

- Coat of arms
- Location of Préchac
- Location within France Location within Occitanie
- Coordinates: 42°59′36″N 0°04′19″W
- Country: France
- Region: Occitania
- Department: Hautes-Pyrénées
- Arrondissement: Argelès-Gazost
- Canton: La Vallée des Gaves
- Intercommunality: Pyrénées Vallées des Gaves

Government
  - Mayor (2024–2026): Christophe Lac
- Area^{1}: 1.59 km^{2} (0.61 sq mi)
- Elevation: 448 m (1,470 ft)
- Highest elevation: 640 m (2,100 ft)
- Lowest elevation: 420 m (1,380 ft)
- Population (2023): 235
  - Density: 148/km^{2} (383/sq mi)
- Time zone: UTC+01:00 (CET)
  - Summer (DST): UTC+02:00 (CEST)
- INSEE/Postal code: 65371 /65400
- ^{1} French Land Register data, which excludes lakes, ponds, glaciers > 1 km^{2} (0.386 sq mi or 247 acres) and river estuaries.

Préchac (French pronunciation: [pʁeʃak]; Occitan: Preishac) is a commune in the Hautes-Pyrénées department in south-western France.

== See also ==
- Communes of the Hautes-Pyrénées department
