= Soulom =

- Commune
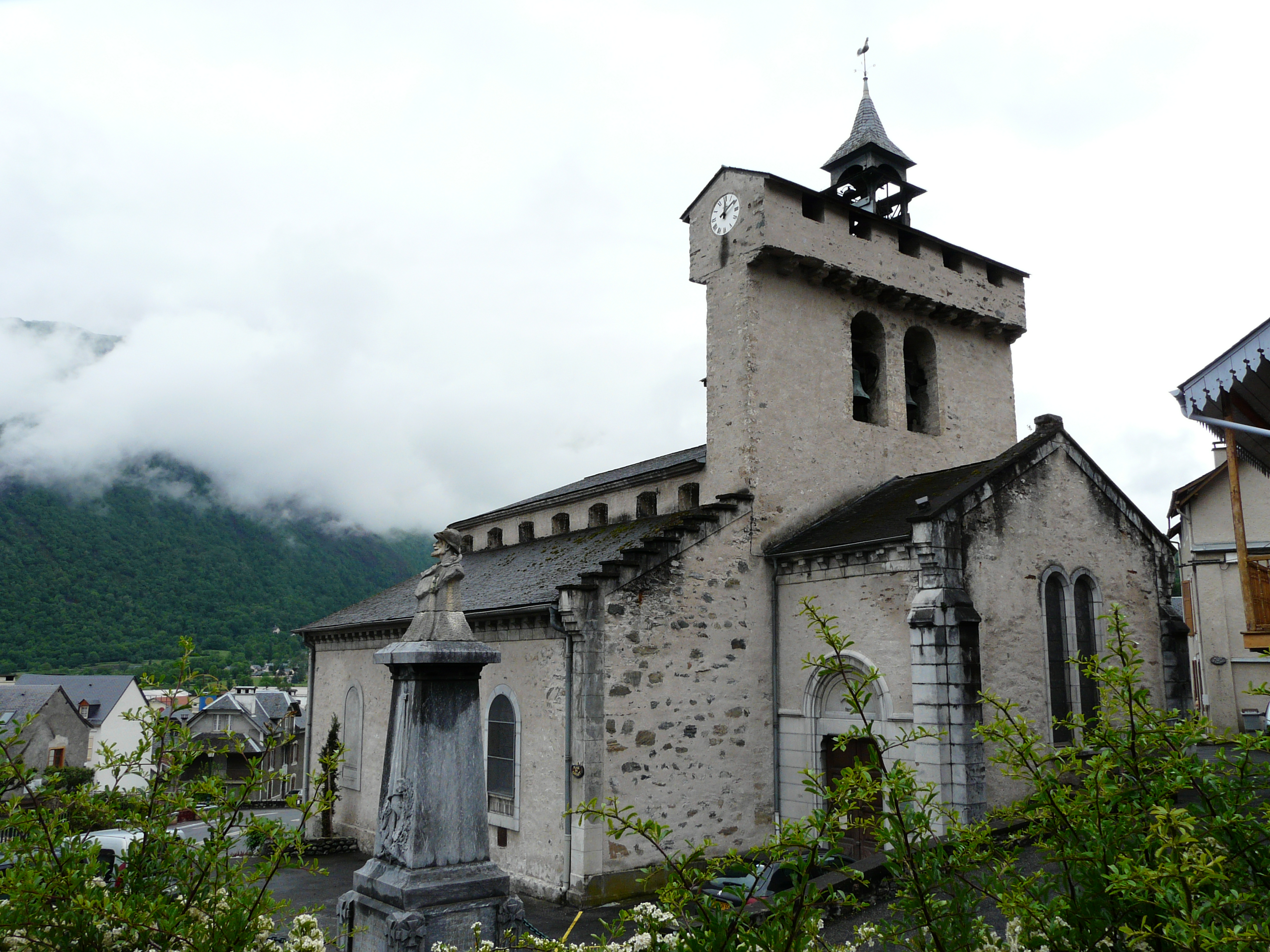
- The church of Saint-André

- Coat of arms
- Location of Soulom
- Location within France Location within Occitanie
- Coordinates: 42°57′21″N 0°04′23″W
- Country: France
- Region: Occitania
- Department: Hautes-Pyrénées
- Arrondissement: Argelès-Gazost
- Canton: La Vallée des Gaves
- Intercommunality: Pyrénées Vallées des Gaves

Government
  - Mayor (2020–2026): Xavier Macias
- Area^{1}: 2.91 km^{2} (1.12 sq mi)
- Elevation: 493 m (1,617 ft)
- Highest elevation: 967 m (3,173 ft)
- Lowest elevation: 458 m (1,503 ft)
- Population (2023): 293
  - Density: 101/km^{2} (261/sq mi)
- Time zone: UTC+01:00 (CET)
  - Summer (DST): UTC+02:00 (CEST)
- INSEE/Postal code: 65435 /65260
- ^{1} French Land Register data, which excludes lakes, ponds, glaciers > 1 km^{2} (0.386 sq mi or 247 acres) and river estuaries.

Soulom is a commune in the Hautes-Pyrénées department in south-western France.

== See also ==
- Communes of the Hautes-Pyrénées department
