= Piton Carré =

French mountain in the Pyrenees

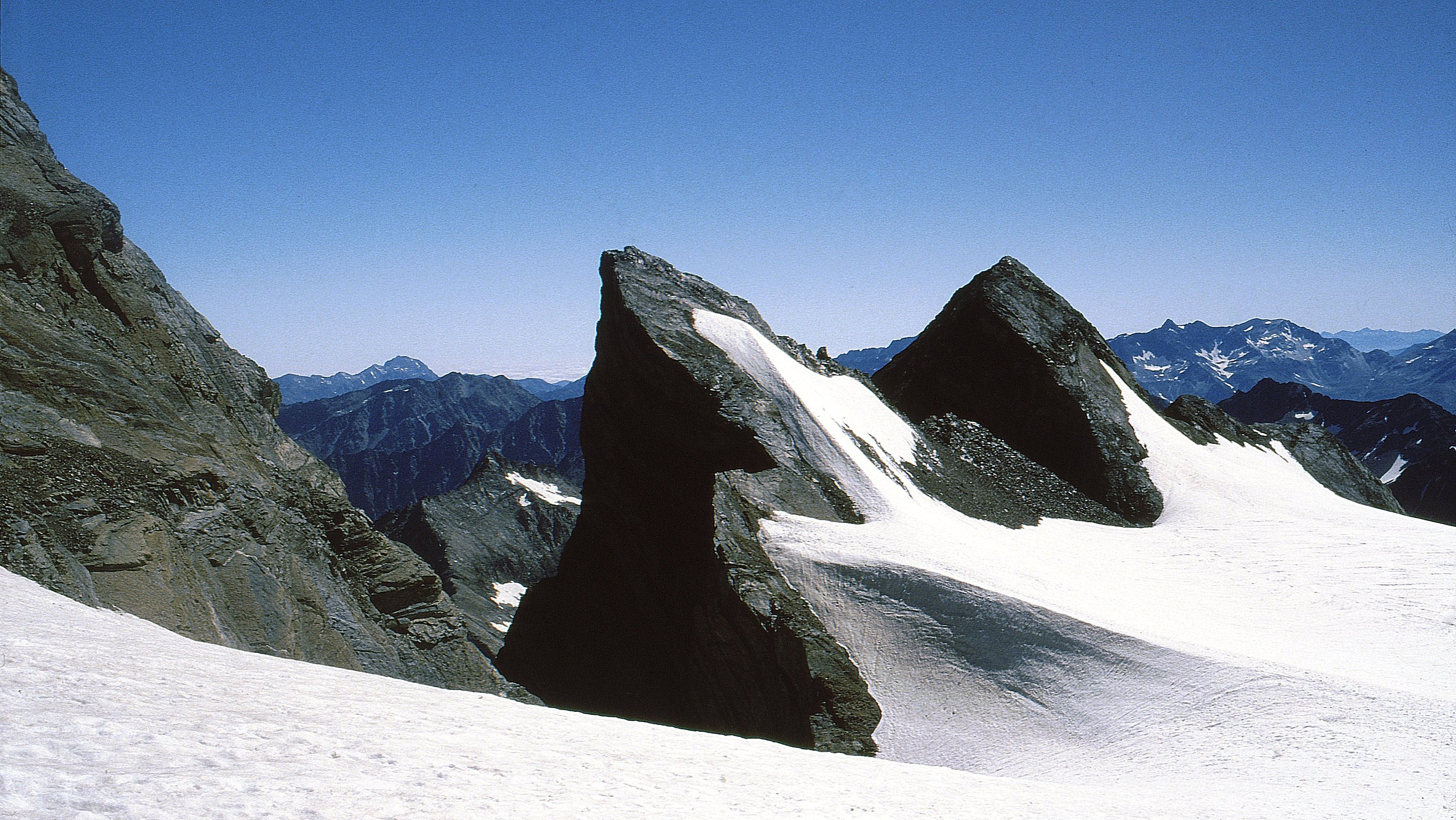
- View of Piton Carré from the glacier du Vignemale.

Highest point
- Elevation: 3,197 m (10,489 ft)
- Listing: List of Pyrenean three-thousanders
- Coordinates: 42°46′24″N 0°08′40″E

Geography
- Location within Pyrenees
- Location: Hautes-Pyrénées, France
- Région: Midi-Pyrénées
- Département: Hautes-Pyrénées
- Parent range: Massif du Vignemale (Pyrenees)

Climbing
- Easiest route: From Glacier d'Ossoue

Piton Carré (3,197 m) is a summit of the Vignemale in the French Pyrenees. It is the seventh highest peak of the Vignemale.

== Geography ==
It is located in the Hautes-Pyrénées department, Midi-Pyrénées region, in the Pyrenees National Park, near Cauterets and Gavarnie.

It is located between Pointe Chausenque and Pique Longue.

== Access ==
The summit is attainable either by the vallée de Gaube beyond Cauterets, or by vallée d'Ossoue.
