= Pointe Chausenque =

Summit in the French Pyrenees

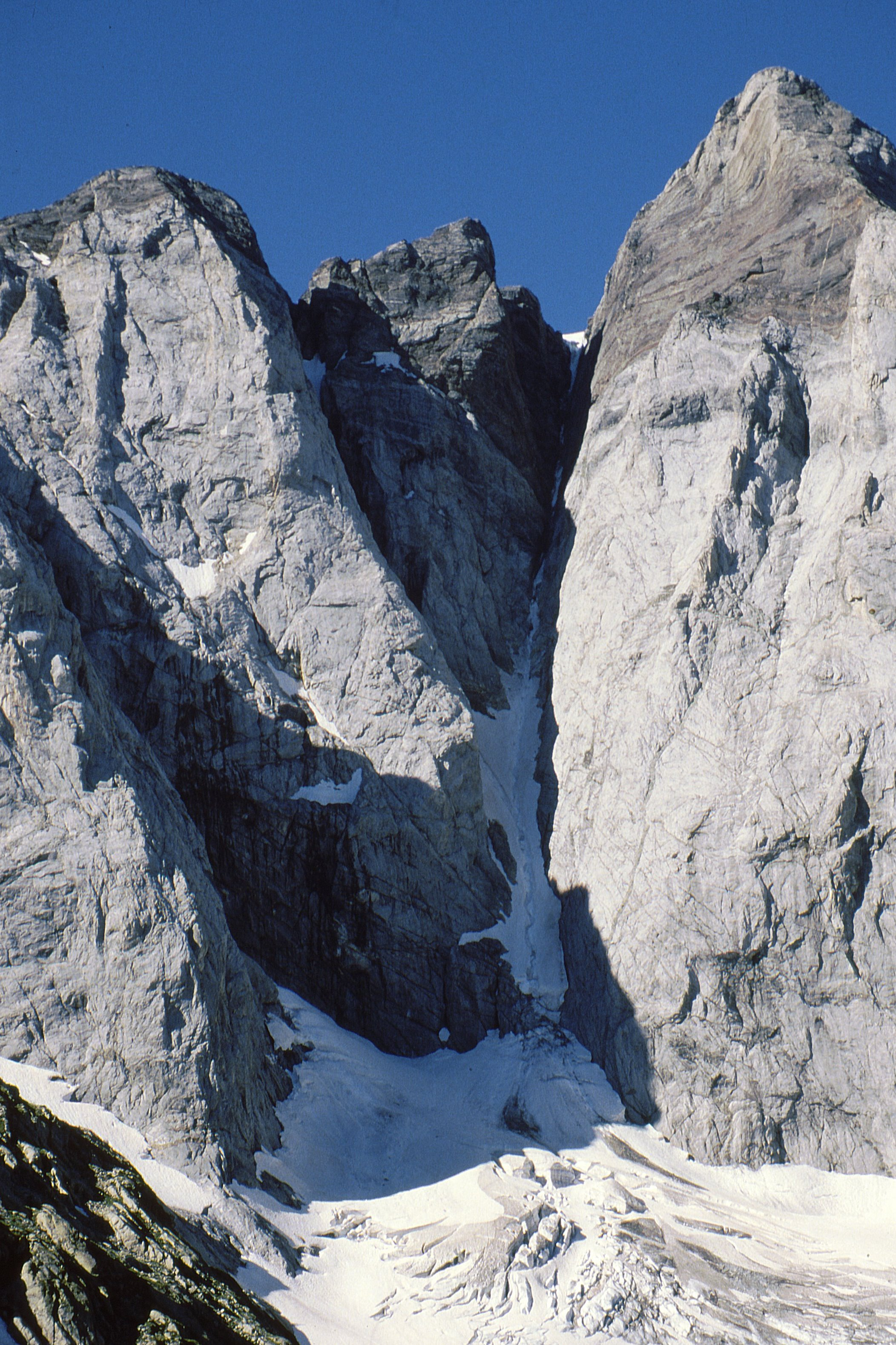
- From left to right: Pointe Chausenque, Piton Carré, Couloir de Gaube, and Pique Longue

Highest point
- Elevation: 3,204 m (10,512 ft)
- Listing: List of Pyrenean three-thousanders
- Coordinates: 42°46′25″N 0°08′30″E

Geography
- Location within Pyrenees
- Location: Hautes-Pyrénées, France
- Region: Midi-Pyrénées
- Parent range: Massif du Vignemale (Pyrenees)

Climbing
- First ascent: June 30, 1822 by Vincent de Chausenque with a guide from Cauterets
- Easiest route: From glacier d'Ossoue

Pointe Chausenque or Punta Chausenca is 3,204m summit in the Vignemale. Vignemale is a massif in the French Pyrenees.

== Topography ==
Virtually as high as the Ossoue glacier to the south, it dominates from 600 m the fr:Glacier des Oulettes de Gaube to the north.

It is the highest Pyrenean summit located only in France, north of the French-Spanish border.

== History ==
The first ascent was led out by Vincent de Chausenque and a guide from Cauterets on June 30, 1822. The summit was reached from Petit Vignemale via the ridge linking both summits.
