= Bridge of Spain =

Bridge of Spain may refer to:

- Pont d'Espagne, a bridge in the French Pyrenees
- Puente de España, a bridge in Manila, Philippines
