= Cauterets =

- Commune
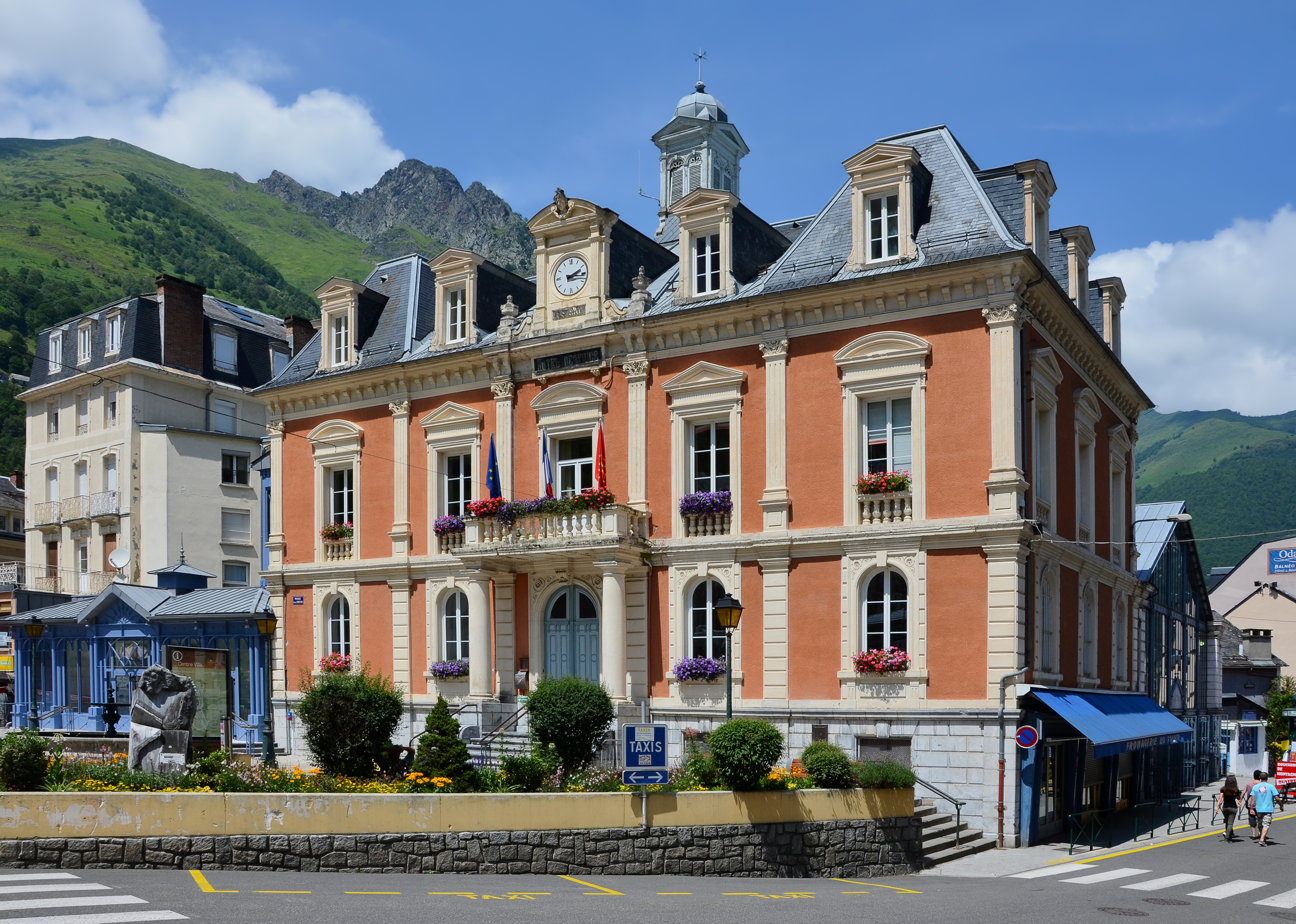
- The town hall of Cauterets

- Coat of arms
- Location of Cauterets
- Location within France Location within Occitanie
- Coordinates: 42°53′N 0°07′W
- Country: France
- Region: Occitania
- Department: Hautes-Pyrénées
- Arrondissement: Argelès-Gazost
- Canton: La Vallée des Gaves
- Intercommunality: Pyrénées Vallées des Gaves

Government
  - Mayor (2020–2026): Jean-Pierre Florence
- Area^{1}: 156.84 km^{2} (60.56 sq mi)
- Elevation: 1,000 m (3,300 ft)
- Highest elevation: 3,300 m (10,800 ft)
- Lowest elevation: 503 m (1,650 ft)
- Population (2023): 829
  - Density: 5.29/km^{2} (13.7/sq mi)
- Time zone: UTC+01:00 (CET)
  - Summer (DST): UTC+02:00 (CEST)
- INSEE/Postal code: 65138 /65110
- ^{1} French Land Register data, which excludes lakes, ponds, glaciers > 1 km^{2} (0.386 sq mi or 247 acres) and river estuaries.

Cauterets (French pronunciation: [kotʁɛ]; in Occitan Cautarés, in Catalan Cautarés, in Aragonese Cautarès) is a spa town, a ski resort and a commune in the Hautes-Pyrénées department and the region of Occitanie in south-western France.

== Toponymy ==
Historical names:

- Caldarez, (c. 1060, Cartulary of Saint-Savin; 1077–1078, ibid.; c. 1094, ibid.)
- Vallem Caldarensem, Latin (1083–1094, ibid.; 1317, Meillon, Cartulary of Saint-Savin)
- In valle Caldarea, Latin (1094–1118, ibid.)
- de Cautereis, Latin (1168, Papal bull of Alexander III)
- Cautares, (1285, Bigorre Clock)
- De Cauteresio, Latin (1342, Pouillé of Tarbes).
- De Cautaresio, Latin (1379, Tarbes proxy)
- Cauteres, (1429, Bigorre censier).
- Cauterez, (1614, Guillaume Mauran)
- Cauterés, (1790, Department 1)
- Cauterez, (1790, Department 2)

The final -t is an error, as it was never used before the 19th century.

Etymology: The meaning doesn't pose a problem: From the Latin (villa/vallis) caldarensis = (villa or Valley) where there are hot baths, in Gascon "los cautarers".

Occitan name: Cautarés.

== Geography ==
Cauterets is located 32 km (20 mi) southwest of Lourdes and borders the Pyrenees National Park. Surrounded by the high mountains of the Pyrenees, the commune of Cauterets spreads in the narrow valley of the Gave de Cauterets, a mountain stream extending from the Gave de Jéret and the Gave du Marcadau and their tributaries, the Gave de Lutour and the Gave de Gaube.

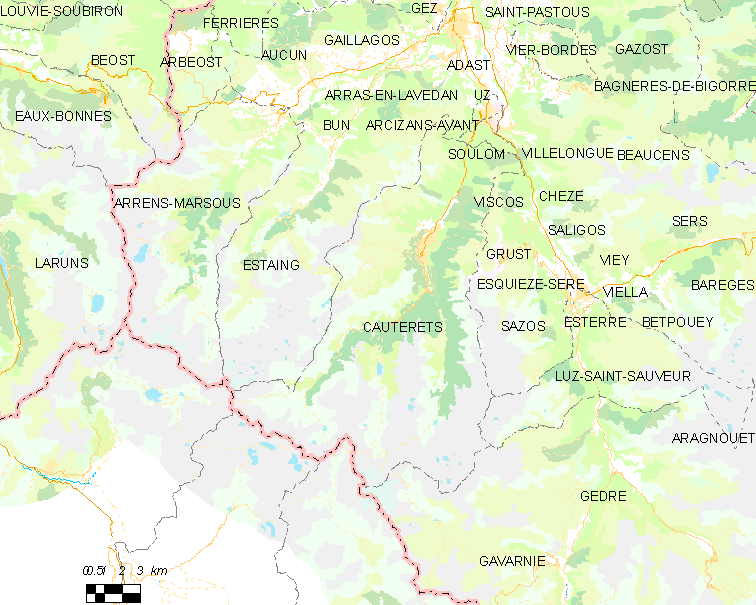
Map of the commune of Cauterets and the surrounding communes

The village gives access to many hiking trails serving natural sights, such as the Pic de Péguère at 2,316 metres (7,598 ft). Meanwhile, Gaube Lake is approximately 1hr and 30 minutes walk from Cauterets or can be accessed by a chairlift from the Pont d'Espagne, a settlement on a mountainside crossed by a waterfall. Also nearby is Petit Vignemale at 3,032 metres (9,948 ft), and the small Massif de la Fruitière. The Cirque de Lys is also accessible by cable car from where there are panoramic views over the Pyrenees. Cauterets is also a regular stopover for walkers travelling on the coast to coast Pyrenean GR10 walking route.

The minimum altitude, 503 metres (1,650 ft), is located in the north, where the Gave de Cauterets leaves the communal area and enters that of Soulom. The maximum elevation of 3,298 metres (10,820 ft) corresponds to the highest point of the French Pyrénées, Vignemale, marking the border with Spain. Other summits in the neighbourhood include the Monné at 2,723 metres (8,934 ft), the Cabaliros at 2,333 metres (7,654 ft) and the Pic de Chabarrou at 2,910 metres (9,550 ft).

=== Neighbouring communes ===
The extensive commune of Cauterets is bordered by Spain to southwest and fourteen communes in France.

=== Springs ===
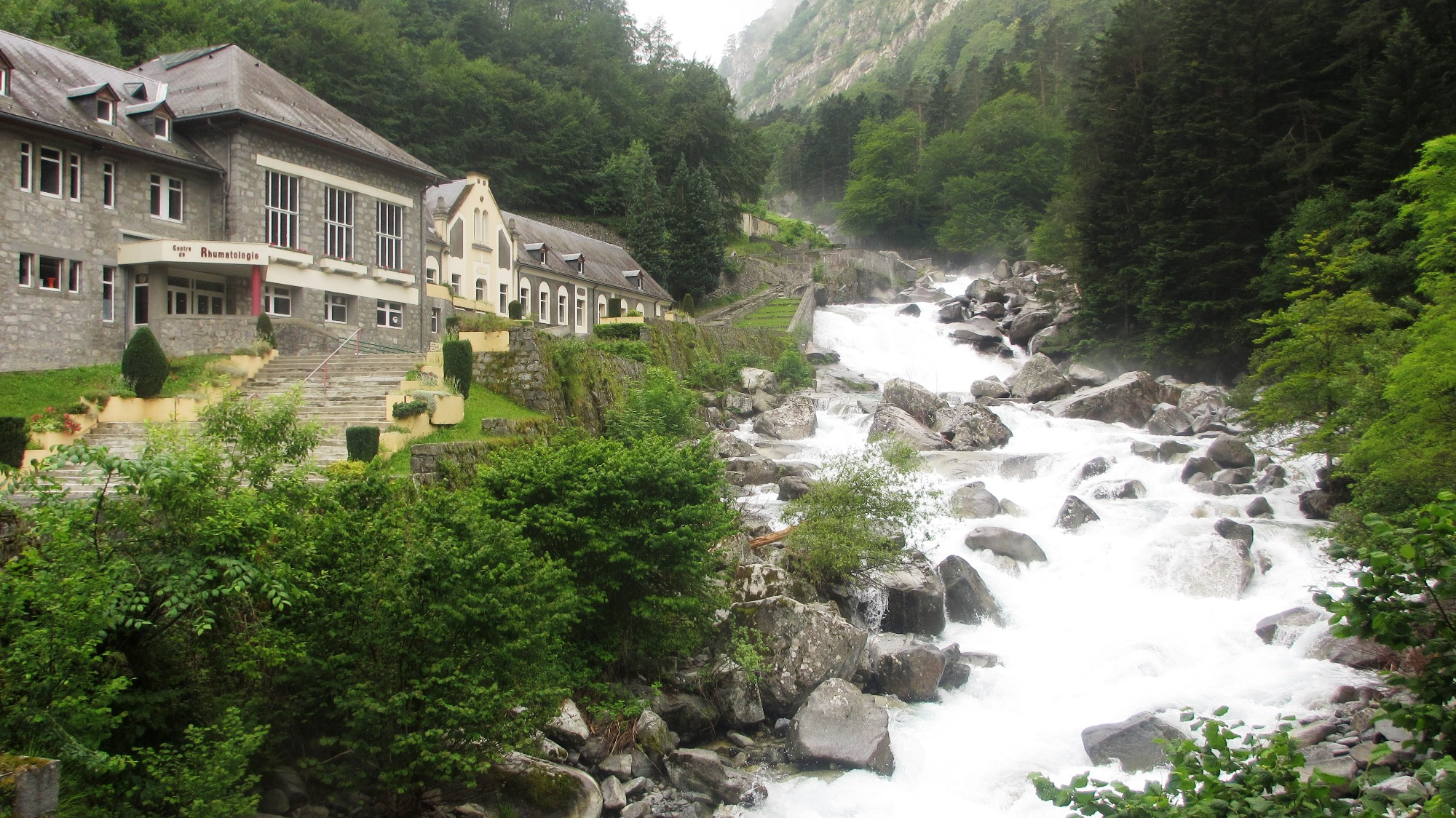
The Établissement Thermale Des Griffon near Cauterets

Cauterets is well known for its copious thermal springs. They are chiefly characterized by the presence of sulphur and silicate of soda, and are used in the treatment of diseases of the respiratory organs, rheumatism, skin diseases and many other maladies. The main thermal baths, Thermes Cesar, were opened in 1843 and continue to offer treatments today.

=== Climate ===
Cauterets has an oceanic climate (Köppen climate classification Cfb). Based on data collected between 1981 and 2010: The mean daily temperature in Cauterets was 9.9 °C (49.8 °F) and average annual rainfall was 1,238.2 mm (48.75 in), with November as the wettest month. July and August were the warmest months, with a mean high of 21.9 °C (71.4 °F), and January and February were the coldest, with a mean low of −0.3 °C (31.5 °F). Through 2015 the highest temperature recorded in Cauterets was 36.3 °C (97.3 °F) on 18 August 2012, and the lowest recorded was −18.0 °C (−0.4 °F) on 11 February 1956.

Climate data for Cauterets (1981−2010 normals, extremes 1954−2015)
| Month | Jan | Feb | Mar | Apr | May | Jun | Jul | Aug | Sep | Oct | Nov | Dec | Year |
|---|---|---|---|---|---|---|---|---|---|---|---|---|---|
| Record high °C (°F) | 21.5 (70.7) | 24.0 (75.2) | 26.0 (78.8) | 27.0 (80.6) | 30.5 (86.9) | 35.0 (95.0) | 36.0 (96.8) | 36.3 (97.3) | 32.0 (89.6) | 29.5 (85.1) | 23.0 (73.4) | 21.0 (69.8) | 36.3 (97.3) |
| Mean daily maximum °C (°F) | 7.6 (45.7) | 8.4 (47.1) | 11.1 (52.0) | 12.6 (54.7) | 16.3 (61.3) | 19.6 (67.3) | 21.9 (71.4) | 21.9 (71.4) | 19.1 (66.4) | 15.6 (60.1) | 10.7 (51.3) | 8.0 (46.4) | 14.4 (57.9) |
| Daily mean °C (°F) | 3.6 (38.5) | 4.1 (39.4) | 6.5 (43.7) | 8.2 (46.8) | 11.5 (52.7) | 14.7 (58.5) | 17.0 (62.6) | 17.0 (62.6) | 14.3 (57.7) | 11.1 (52.0) | 6.6 (43.9) | 4.2 (39.6) | 9.9 (49.8) |
| Mean daily minimum °C (°F) | −0.3 (31.5) | −0.3 (31.5) | 1.9 (35.4) | 3.7 (38.7) | 6.8 (44.2) | 9.8 (49.6) | 12.0 (53.6) | 12.1 (53.8) | 9.5 (49.1) | 6.6 (43.9) | 2.5 (36.5) | 0.4 (32.7) | 5.4 (41.7) |
| Record low °C (°F) | −13.5 (7.7) | −18.0 (−0.4) | −14.0 (6.8) | −7.0 (19.4) | −3.5 (25.7) | −1.0 (30.2) | 3.0 (37.4) | 3.0 (37.4) | −1.0 (30.2) | −4.0 (24.8) | −9.5 (14.9) | −15.0 (5.0) | −18.0 (−0.4) |
| Average precipitation mm (inches) | 128.0 (5.04) | 91.5 (3.60) | 99.7 (3.93) | 122.2 (4.81) | 108.1 (4.26) | 79.6 (3.13) | 72.1 (2.84) | 72.5 (2.85) | 86.3 (3.40) | 111.7 (4.40) | 135.4 (5.33) | 131.1 (5.16) | 1,238.2 (48.75) |
| Average precipitation days (≥ 1.0 mm) | 10.9 | 10.0 | 10.5 | 13.1 | 14.5 | 10.9 | 8.5 | 9.5 | 9.5 | 11.7 | 11.2 | 11.6 | 131.7 |
Source: Météo-France

== History ==
=== Prehistory and antiquity ===
Prehistoric and Protohistoric remnants have been found, many in the valleys above Cauterets: Eleven stone circles, four cromlech tumuli, six individual tumuli and five dolmens. The stone circles are particularly located in the Marcadau Valley and some plains and pastures.

There are few traces of the period preceding the Roman conquest. Of the Gallo-Roman period, remains were found which used Cauterets thermal waters, such as a swimming pool. On the balcony of Saint-Savin, a castrum was built as well as the Palatium Aemilianum villa. The Villa Bencer was located on the present site of the village of Cauterets.

=== Middle Ages ===
In the 8th or 9th century, a monk by the name of Sabinus came to live as a hermit in the valley. The future Saint Savin, his miracles and his canonization caused an influx of pilgrims. An abbey was built around his hermitage. It had the hôpital de Cauterès, named in a Papal Bull of the 12th century along with territories given by various lords, such as Charlemagne and the Comte de Bigorre. The abbey was plundered and destroyed by the Normans.

Between 1059 and 1078, Bernard III, Abbot of Saint-Savin, had installed a pool called "bain d'en-haut" [bath from above]. Cabin houses were grouped around this pool. This was the beginning of the village of Cauterets (Caouteres).

In the 12th century, a conflict arose between the inhabitants of Lavedan and those of the Aspe Valley for a theft of livestock; the result was the death of several Aspe people. The Bishop of Comminges, Bertrand excommunicated the Bigorre people who were repentant. They were sentenced to life imprisonment and to pay a yearly fine on the day of Saint Michel in the Church of Saint-Savin. It was regularly paid until 1789, and it was known as the tribut des Médailles [tribute of the medals].

Three baths existed around the different hot springs and there were twenty feus in the village. Gaston Phébus came to Cauterets to treat his deafness in 1380.

=== Early modern period ===
Return to "antique" values during the Renaissance of the 16th century favoured the return to the baths and the thermal waters. Multiple visits by Marguerite de Navarre in this century gave real fame to Cauterets.

In the 16th century, the Abbey of Saint-Savin lost its prestige and decayed due to lack of maintenance. During the French Wars of Religion, hydrotherapy stopped due to the destruction and wars against Spain.

The construction of passable roads in the 18th century to La Raillère helped the development of the valley. La Raillère became a water source of fashion thanks to editions of books on the water sources of Cauterets. At the end of the 18th century, the Bruzaud Spa was built.

=== Contemporary period ===
==== The 19th century and the golden age of spas ====
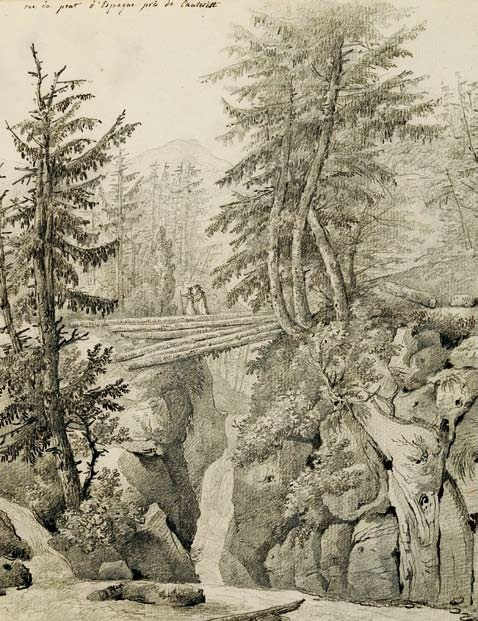
Hortense de Beauharnais, Vue du Pont d'Espagne près de Cauterets, (A view of the Bridge of Spain near to Cauterets), 1807, Musée Paul-Dupuy, Toulouse

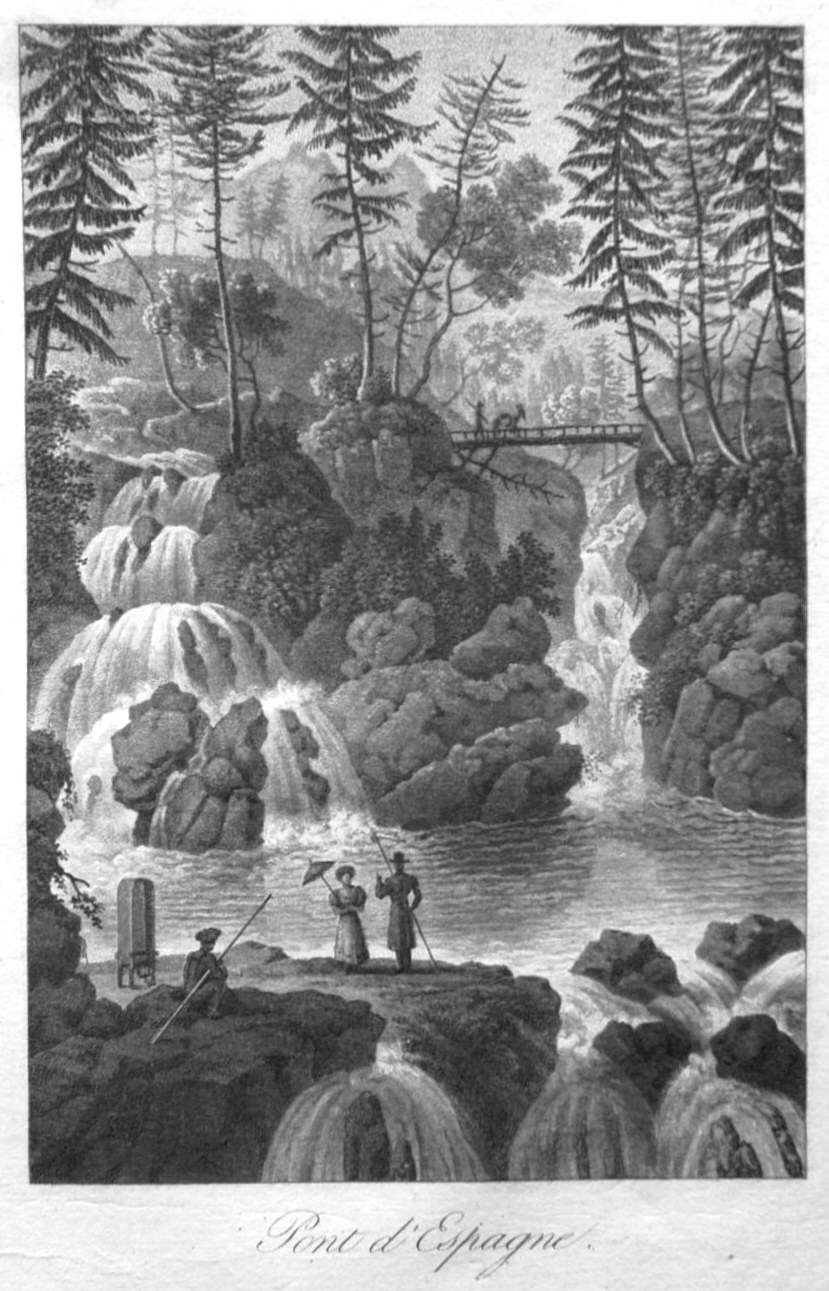
An engraving by A. M. Perrot, 1834

The thermal baths of César, the Grand Hôtel d'Angleterre and the Grand Hotel Continental were all created along with monumental facades. All are witnesses of a 19th-century golden age of spas. Among its famous visitors, George Sand went there in 1825, Chateaubriand in 1829 and Victor Hugo in 1843. However, the socialites weren't the only ones to attend Cauterets: Bernadette Soubirous, affected by asthma, went there on several occasions in 1858 and 1859.

The vogue of hydrotherapy in the 19th century brought many personalities including members of the Bonaparte family. Hortense de Beauharnais, Queen of Holland, daughter of Empress Joséphine and wife of Louis Bonaparte, King of Holland stayed in Cauterets from 18 June to 10 August 1807. On 25 July 1807, the Queen accompanied by guides Clement, Lacrampe and Martin, made the Cauterets-Gavarnie crossing by the Hourquette d'Ossoue. In 1822, Vincent Chausenque, made the first ascent of the peak that now bears his name at 3,205 metres (10,515 ft) above sea level. Count Henry Russell and other famous mountaineers came to realise numerous ascents from the valley. On 8 September 1859, Napoleon III and Empress Eugenie visited Cauterets.

La Raillère was built in stone from 1818 to 1828.

Transport infrastructure developed strongly, including the line of railway between Lourdes and Pierrefitte which opened in 1871, then the Pierrefitte-Cauterets electric line in 1899, and the Cauterets-La Raillère tramway was put into service on 2 August 1897.

==== The 20th century: Towards a society of leisure ====
At the beginning of the 20th century, Louis Falisse was one of the pioneers of skiing in the Pyrenees. With Henri Sallenave and Louis Robach, he made the first ascents of the Vignemale and the Aneto on ski. They gave tribute to the Pic Falisse at 2,765 metres (9,072 ft), close to the Grande Fache. The Cauterets ski club was founded in 1907. In 1910, the France Skiing Championship was organised at Eaux-Bonnes and Cauterets. In 1918, one of the first guardians of the Walloon refuge was Pantet; Pic R.-Pantet at 2,867 metres (9,406 ft) bears his name.

In 1937, the idea of a cable car to develop the skiing was launched but postponed due to World War II.

In the 1950s, during the construction of numerous hydroelectric dams, Cauterets refused the introduction of several selected at the Pont d'Espagne.

On 18 June 2013, a catastrophic flood destroyed several buildings of the village. The RD920 departmental road, the access road to Cauterets from Pierrefitte-Nestalas, was swept away by the Gave de Cauterets. The services of the General Council of the Hautes-Pyrénées commissioned a new section of road, in record time, of several hundred metres drawn on a mountainside, with a succession of spectacular laces that bypass the collapsed area.

=== Heraldry ===
| Arms of Cauterets | The arms of Cauterets are blazoned : Azure to a mountain of argent, on a plain of vert, ensigned by a jackdaw sable taking off between two pots of gules. Comments: The mountain recalls the geographic location of the legendary Lavedan jackdaws. The pots are filled with cold water (ice torrent) and hot water (sulphurous at 55°C) and recall the origin of the name of the city; Cauterets = hot and cold. |

== Demography ==
Historical population

| Year | Pop. | ±% p.a. |
|---|---|---|
| 1793 | 659 | — |
| 1800 | 600 | −1.33% |
| 1806 | 672 | +1.91% |
| 1821 | 720 | +0.46% |
| 1831 | 1,001 | +3.35% |
| 1836 | 956 | −0.92% |
| 1841 | 1,054 | +1.97% |
| 1846 | 1,269 | +3.78% |
| 1851 | 1,301 | +0.50% |
| 1856 | 1,376 | +1.13% |
| 1861 | 1,457 | +1.15% |
| 1866 | 1,611 | +2.03% |
| 1872 | 1,555 | −0.59% |

| Year | Pop. | ±% p.a. |
|---|---|---|
| 1876 | 1,786 | +3.52% |
| 1881 | 1,989 | +2.18% |
| 1886 | 1,941 | −0.49% |
| 1891 | 1,685 | −2.79% |
| 1896 | 1,594 | −1.10% |
| 1901 | 1,547 | −0.60% |
| 1906 | 1,416 | −1.75% |
| 1911 | 1,424 | +0.11% |
| 1921 | 1,374 | −0.36% |
| 1926 | 1,300 | −1.10% |
| 1931 | 1,577 | +3.94% |
| 1936 | 1,253 | −4.50% |
| 1946 | 1,012 | −2.11% |

| Year | Pop. | ±% p.a. |
|---|---|---|
| 1954 | 1,242 | +2.59% |
| 1962 | 1,034 | −2.27% |
| 1968 | 1,130 | +1.49% |
| 1975 | 1,065 | −0.84% |
| 1982 | 1,105 | +0.53% |
| 1990 | 1,201 | +1.05% |
| 1999 | 1,305 | +0.93% |
| 2007 | 1,106 | −2.05% |
| 2012 | 1,063 | −0.79% |
| 2017 | 908 | −3.10% |
| 2023 | 829 | −1.51% |

From 1962 to 1999: Population without double counting; for the years following: municipal population.
Source: Ldh/EHESS/Cassini until 1999 then INSEE from 2007

== Politics and administration ==
=== Intercommunality ===
Cauterets is part of the Communauté de communes Pyrénées Vallées des Gaves, created in January 2017, which has brought together 46 communes.

=== List of mayors ===
List of mayors of Cauterets
| Start | End | Name | Party | Other details |
|---|---|---|---|---|
| March 2006 (re-elected in March 2014) | 2020 | Michel Aubry (Note: Elected in March 2006 during elections following the resignation of part of the previous municipal council.) | | |
| 2020 | 2026 | Jean Pierre Florence | | |

== Tourism ==
=== Hydrotherapy ===
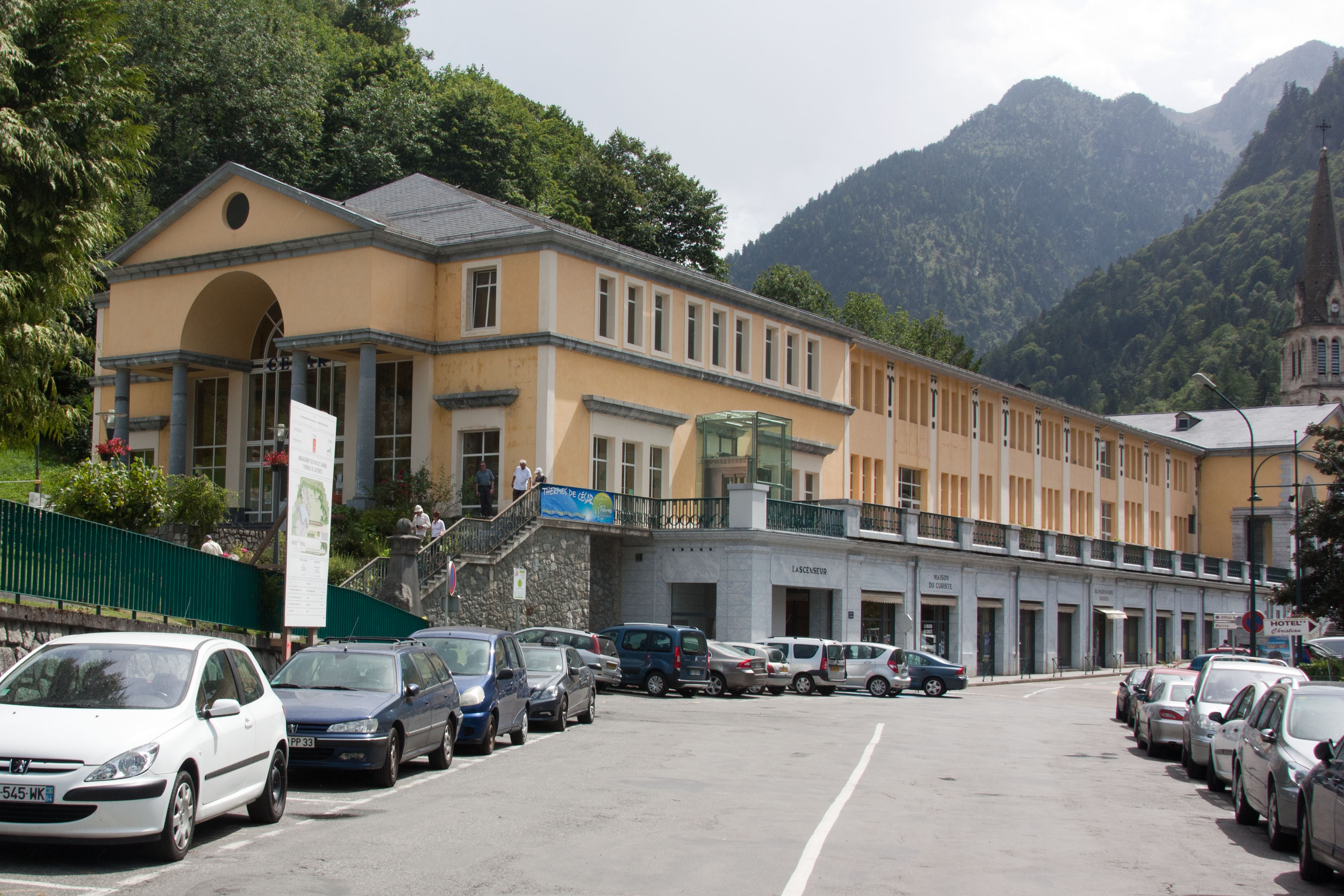
The Baths of César

Cauterets is a spa town with instructions in ENT and Rheumatology. The waters of its eleven sources are exploited in two institutions that receive spa guests: The Baths of César in the village of Cauterets, and the Baths of the Gryphons in the hamlet of La Raillère. Sources still remain the property of a syndicate of the neighbouring communes.

=== Specialties ===
Confectionery arrived in the 16th century in Europe, the berlingot came to the thermal water communes of the Pyrenees in the 19th century, including Cauterets, according to the recommendations of some medical practitioners, to reduce the sulphur water taste. Ten berlingot manufacturers existed in Cauterets at the beginning of the 20th century. There were four shops in 2014, three of which specialised in this product.

=== Winter sports resort ===
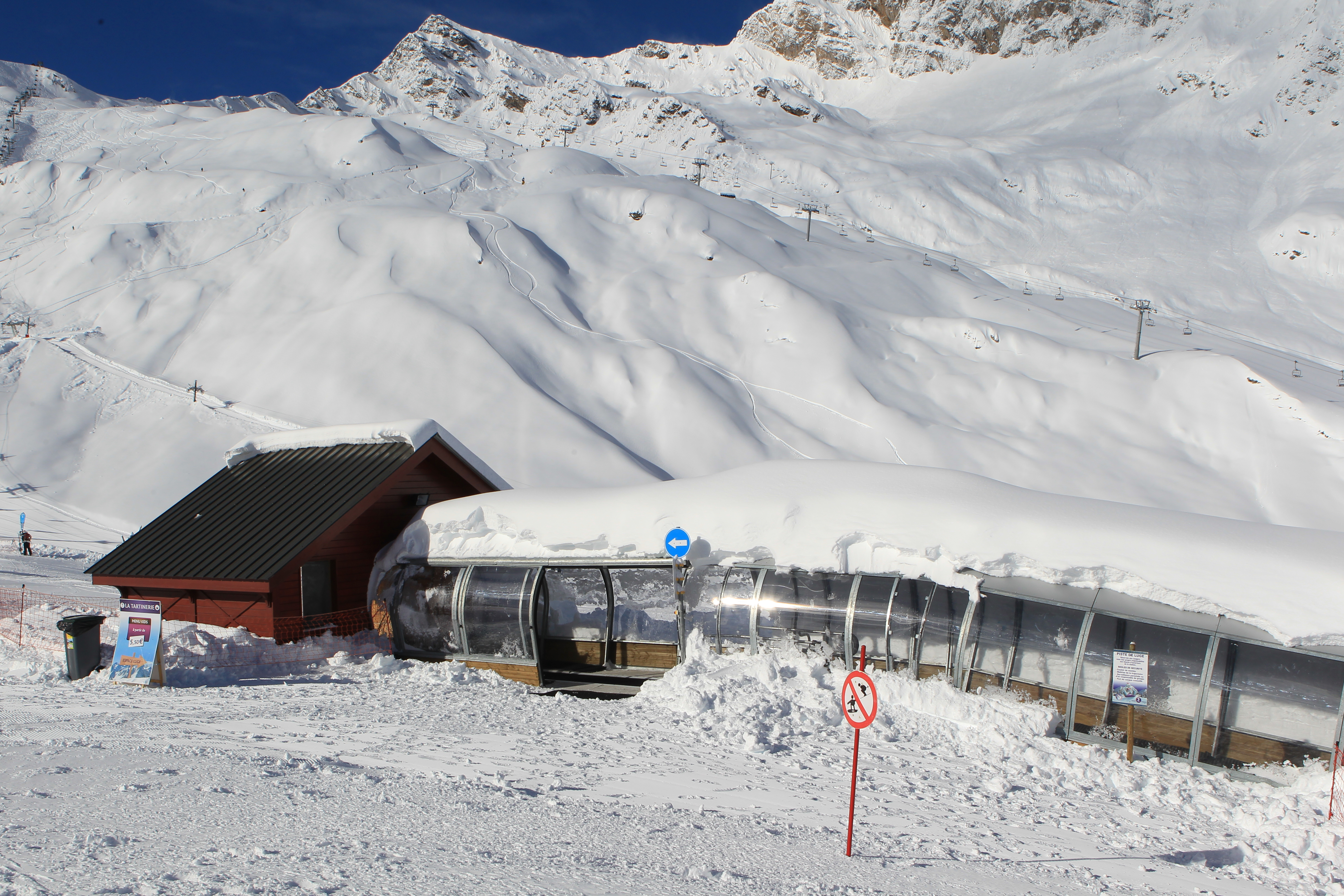
A moving walkway funbelt for skiers

Cauterets is a winter sports resort where one can enjoy downhill skiing and cross country skiing. There are 36 kilometres (22 mi) of cross country tracks at Pont d'Espagne and 25 downhill pistes at Cirque du Lys between 1,700 metres (5,600 ft) and 2,500 metres (8,200 ft) altitude which are mainly suited for beginners and intermediates. A new cable car was built in 2005 which can transport 2000 skiers per hour to the Cirque du Lys area.

In February 2013, Cauterets experienced a record snowfall, making it the snowiest resort in the world ahead of Mammoth Mountain with 5.5 metres (18 ft) at the ski resort.

== Sports ==
The European Athletics Association organized the European Mountain Running Championships on 8 July 2007.

=== Cycling ===
==== Vuelta a España ====
- 2003, stage 7, Huesca – Cauterets: Michael Rasmussen

==== Tour de France ====
- 1953, stage 10, Pau – Cauterets (2C): Jesús Loroño
- 1989, stage 9, Pau – Cauterets-Cambasque (1C): Miguel Induráin
- 1995, stage 15, Saint-Girons – Cauterets-Cambasque (1C): Richard Virenque
- 2015, stage 11, Pau – Cauterets (2C): Rafał Majka
- 2023, stage 6, Tarbes - Cauterets-Cambasque (1C) : Tadej Pogačar.

== Places and monuments ==
=== Architectural heritage ===
- The Church of Our Lady, inaugurated in 1886, was erected at the site of the former demolished church in 1884. In 1995, the Association of the Friends of the Organ acquired a work by Pierre Baldi: "The Way of the Cross", 1st Prize of World Sacred Paintings in 1996, which stands today in the church.
- Inaugurated in 1901, the old railway station of Cauterets was included in the title of historic monuments in 1981 for its façades and roofs. This is an original building somewhat akin to mountain chalets, while others can see it as being in the Wild West style. The Pierrefitte-Cauterets tramway line was abandoned in 1949, it has been transformed into a greenway of 30 kilometres (19 mi). The station itself is now the place for shows and other events, only buses approach it now. Indeed, it is still a bus station.
- The old station of the aerial tramway was built by the teams of Gustave Eiffel.
- The thermal baths of César, renovated in 1999, were built in 1844.
- The entirety of Rue Richelieu, followed by Rue de la Raillère, presents itself as the historic axis of the village. Located on the right bank of the Gave de Cauterets, hotels and emblematic residences of Cauterets are found here.
- Chalet Galitzine, dating from 1840.
- Boulevard Latapie-Flurin has several notable buildings from the end of the 19th century, the Hotel d'Angleterre [England Hotel], the Continental Hotel and Casino Club. The Continental Hotel, became the Continental Residence building and the Casino Club, which became the Residence du Lys, offer ornate facades of many sculptures. The Continental Residence building has been registered as a historical monument since 1984, for its main façade.
Architectural heritage

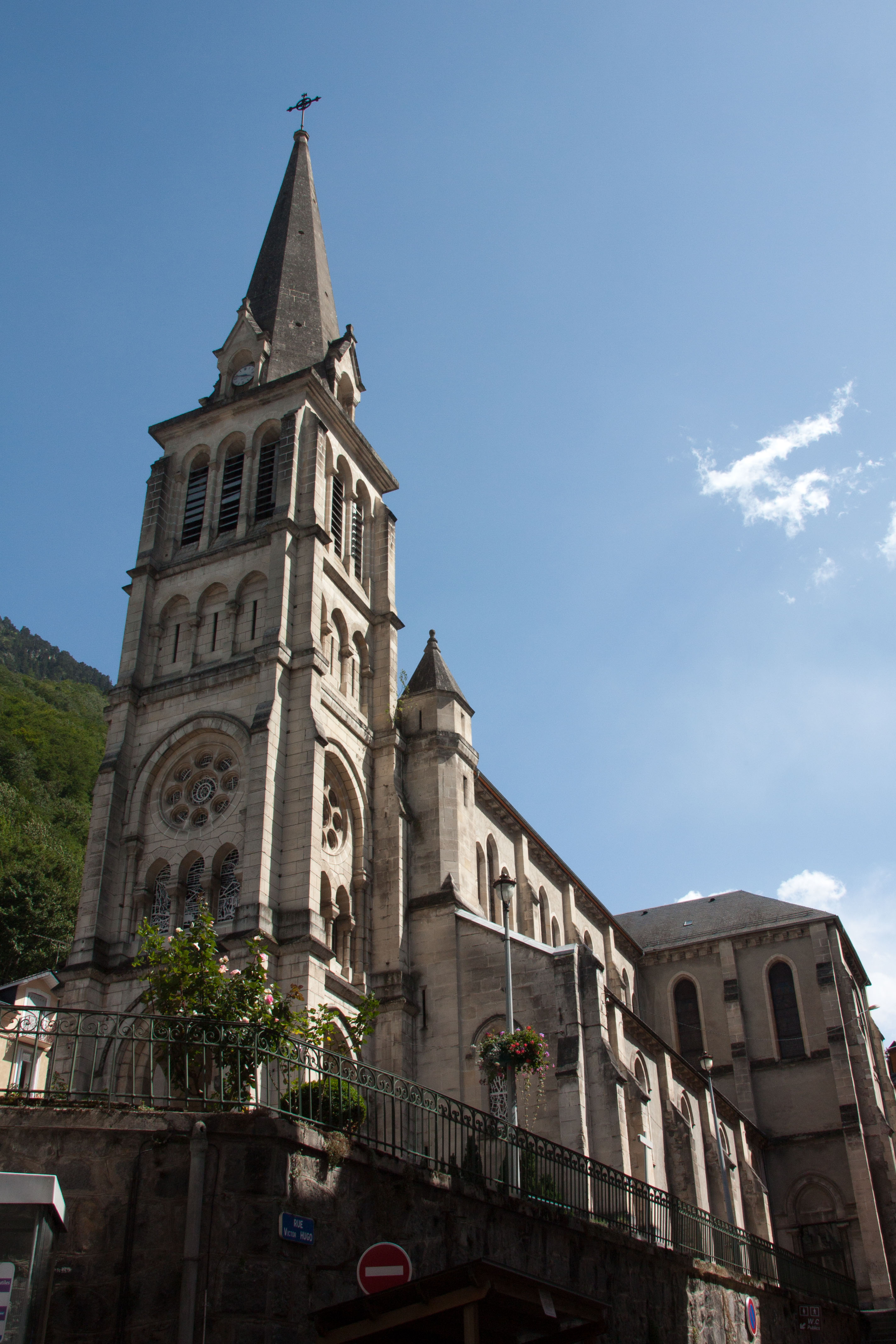
The church of Notre-Dame

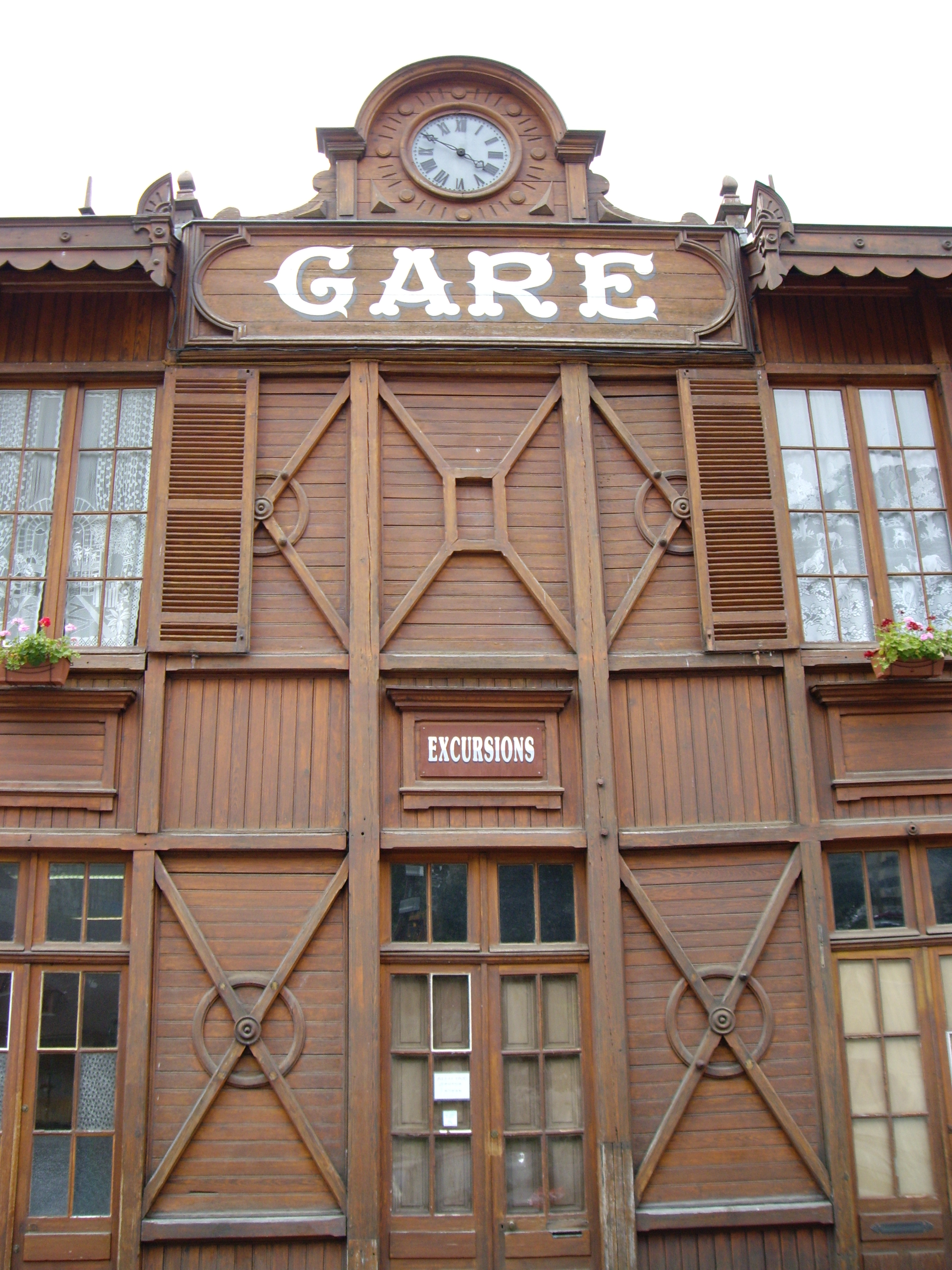
The former railway station, now a bus station

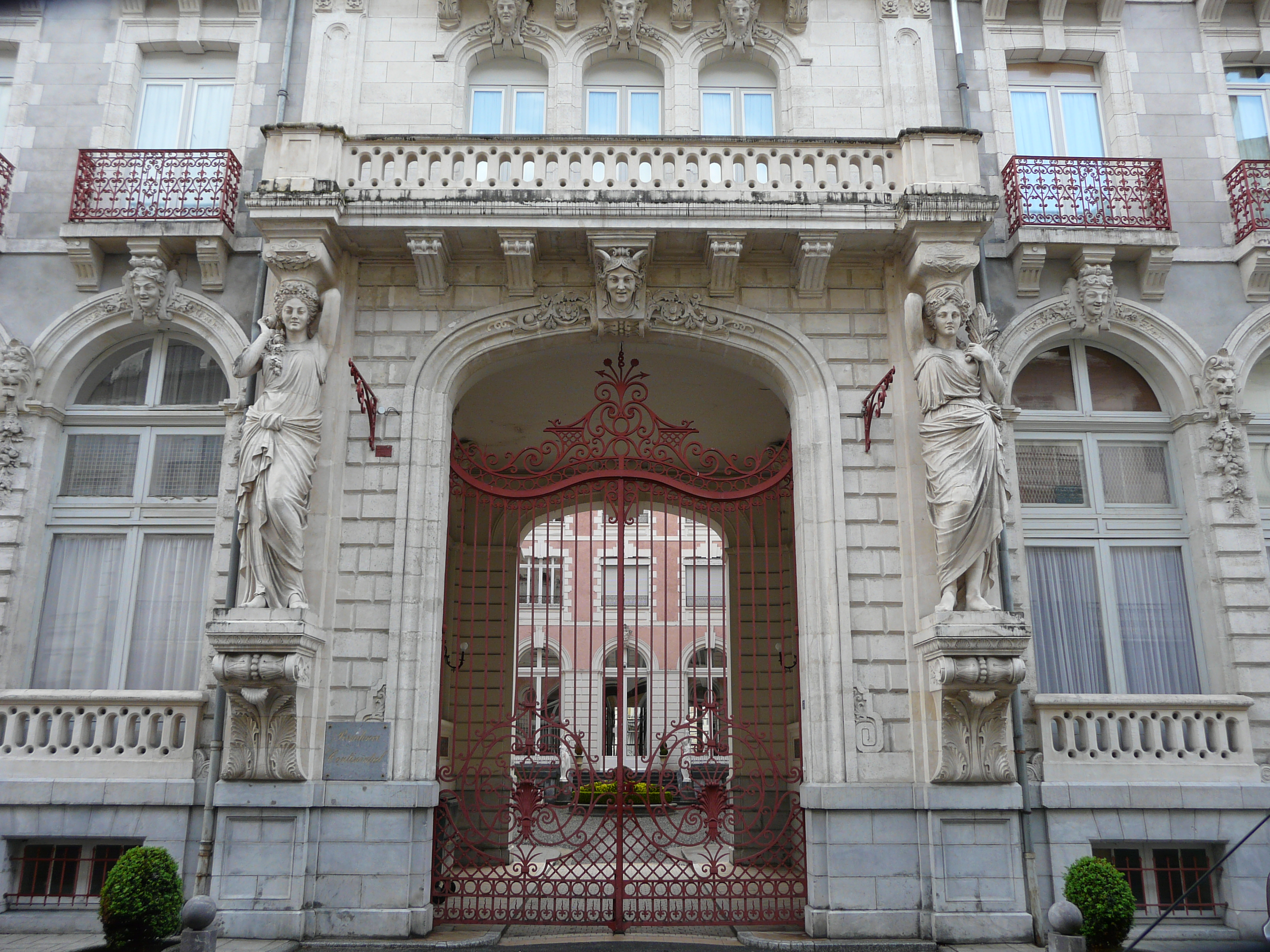
Gateway to the Continental Residence building.

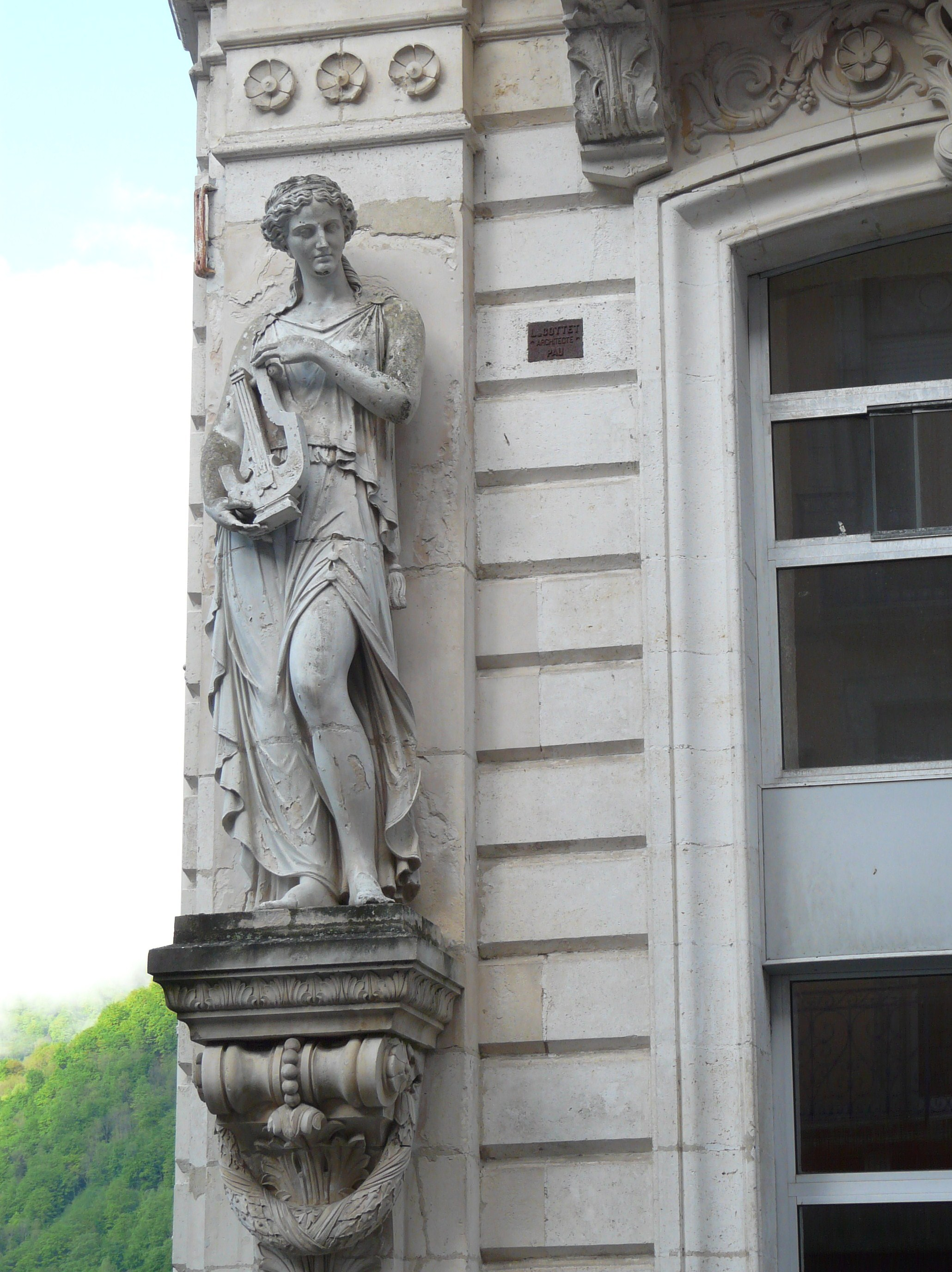
One of the statues of the Residence of Lys building.

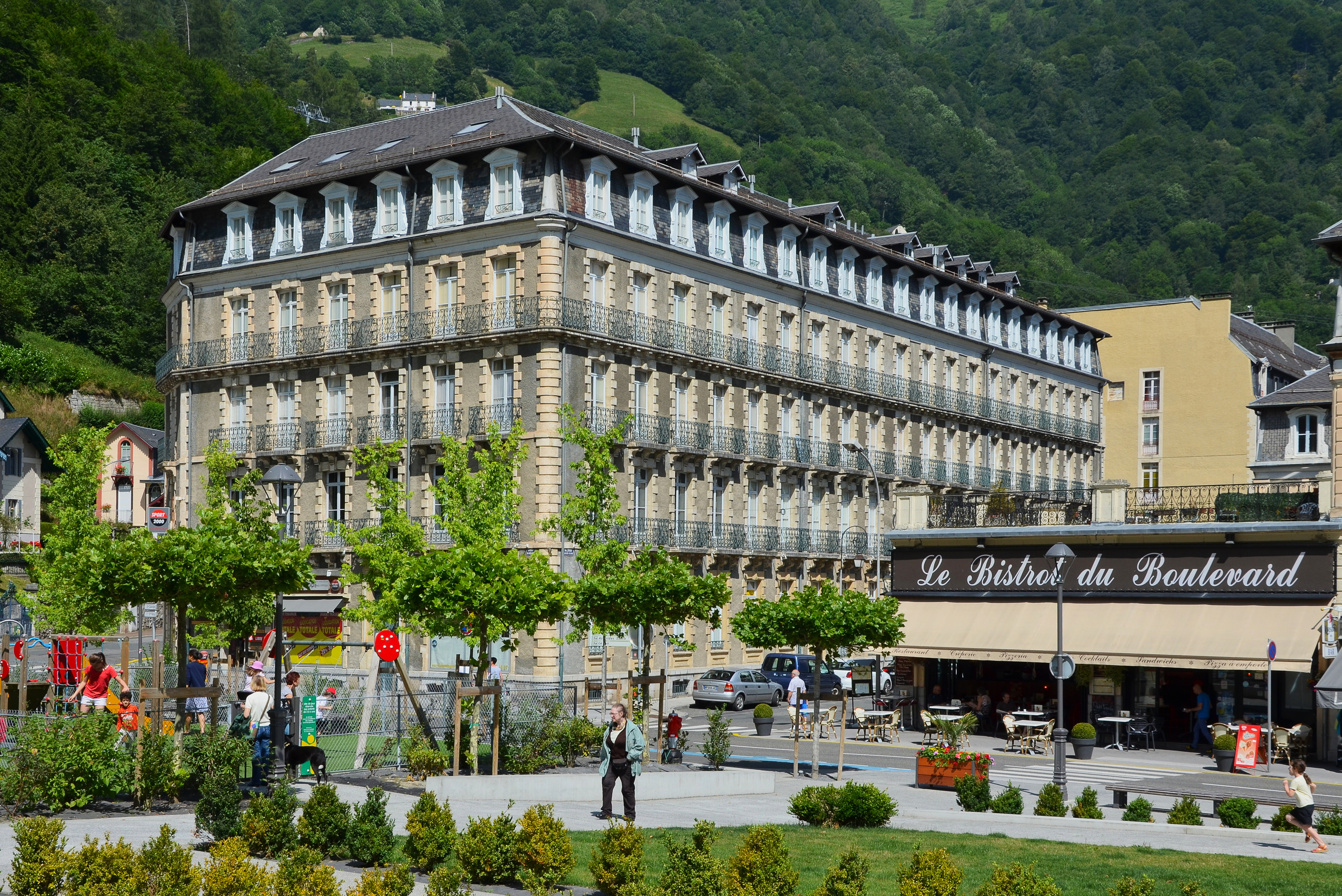
The old Hotel d'Angleterre [England Hotel] and café

=== Natural heritage ===
An extensive Pyrenean commune, Cauterets offers many natural sites in connection with the Pyrénées National Park, such as the Pont d'Espagne, Gaube Lake and the cascades which adorn the Gave de Jéret and the Gave de Lutour.

From the village of Cauterets, the Lys gondola lift and Grand Barbat chairlift provide access to the Cirque du Lys.

Waters around Cauterets

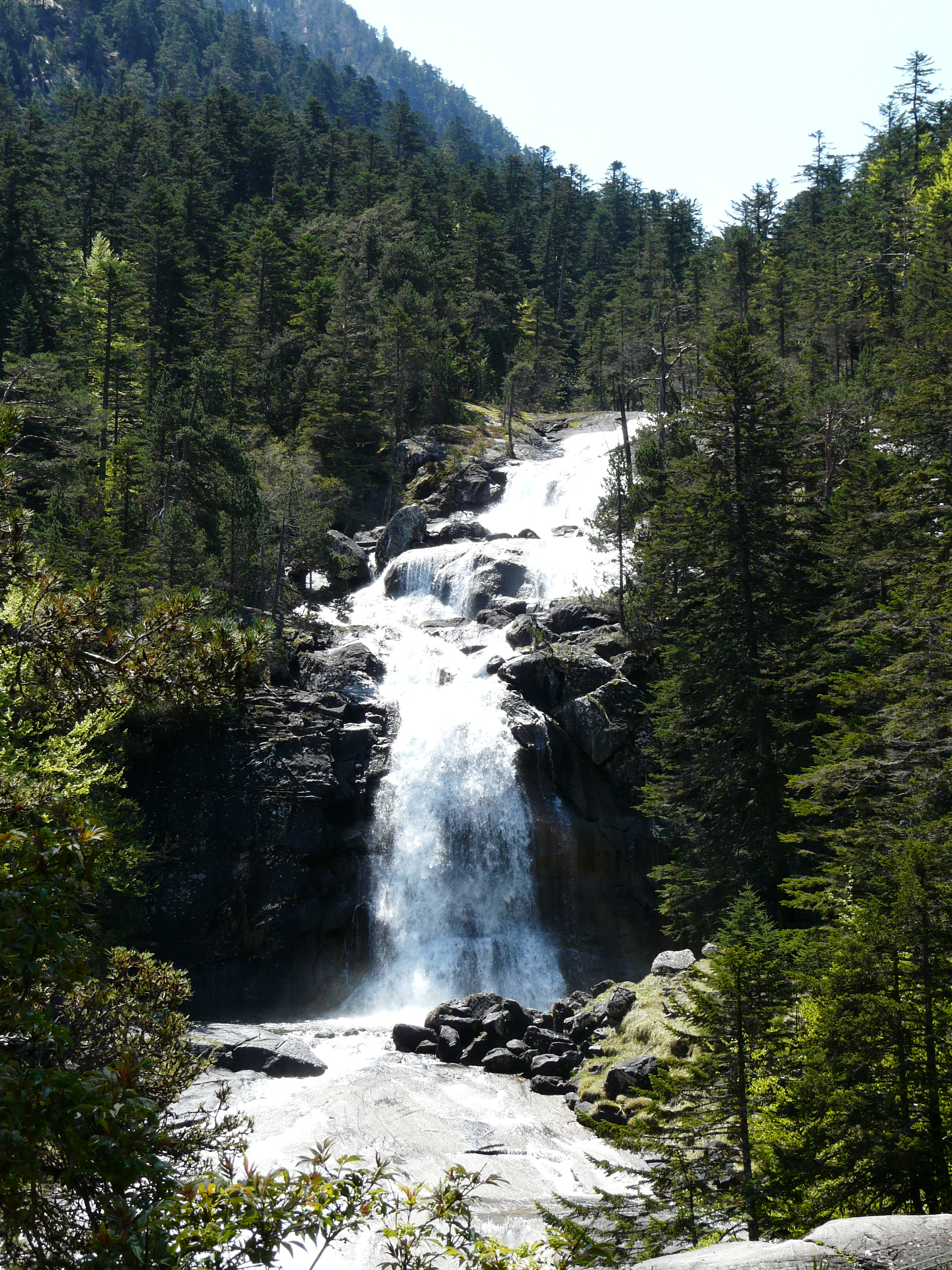
The Pont d'Espagne waterfall

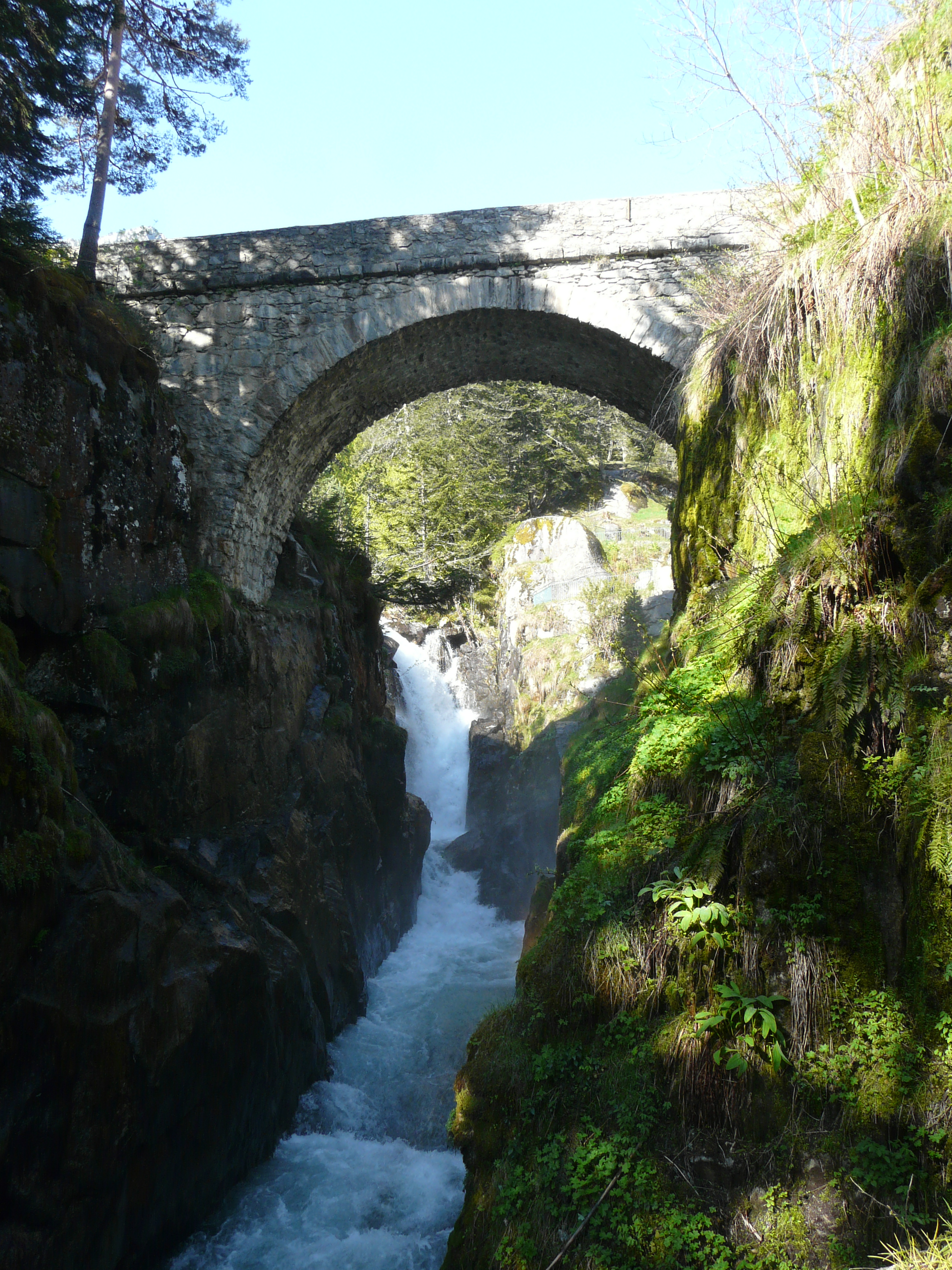
The Pont d'Espagne [Bridge of Spain]

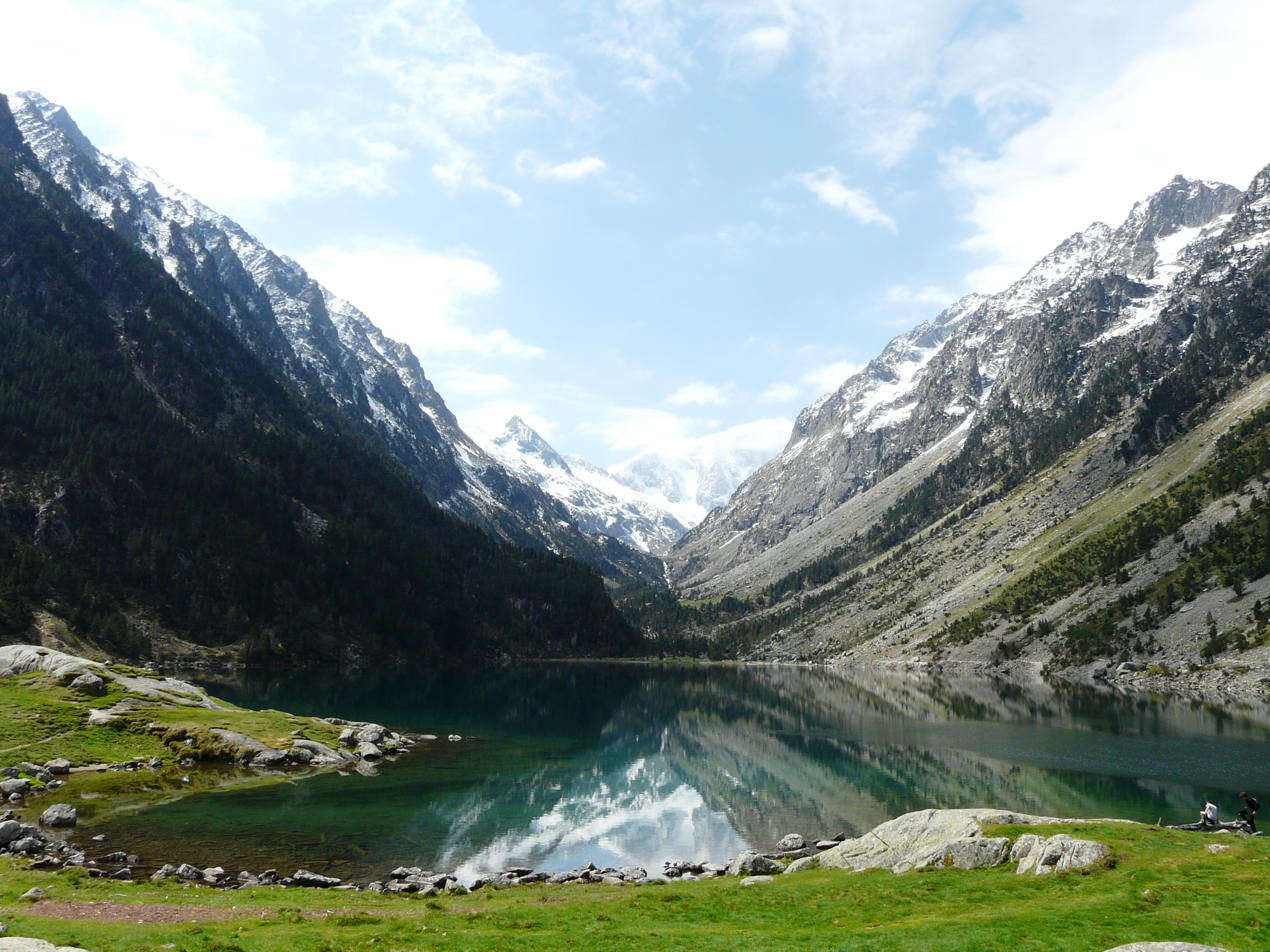
The Lac de Gaube [Gaube Lake]

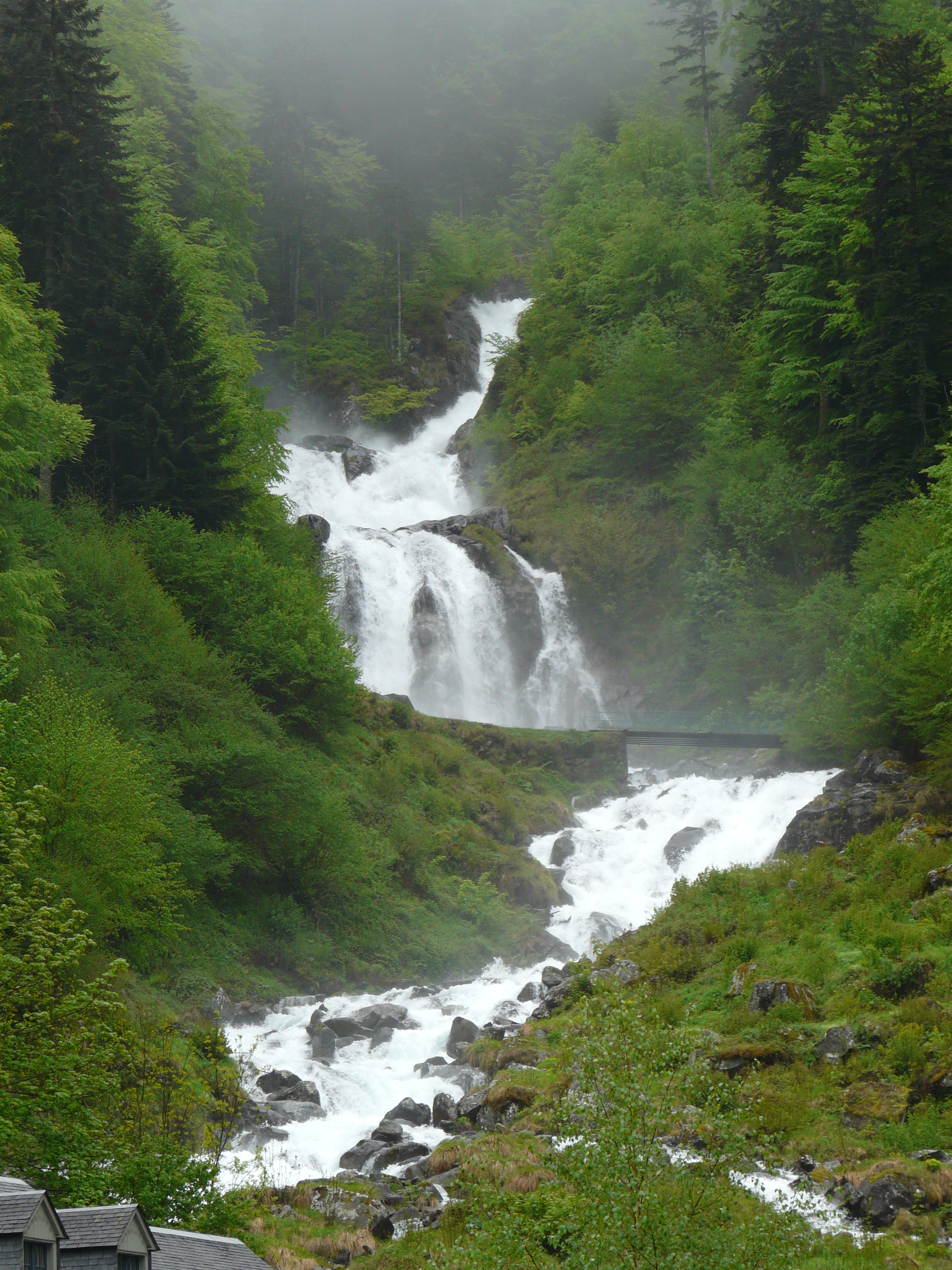
The Lutour waterfall

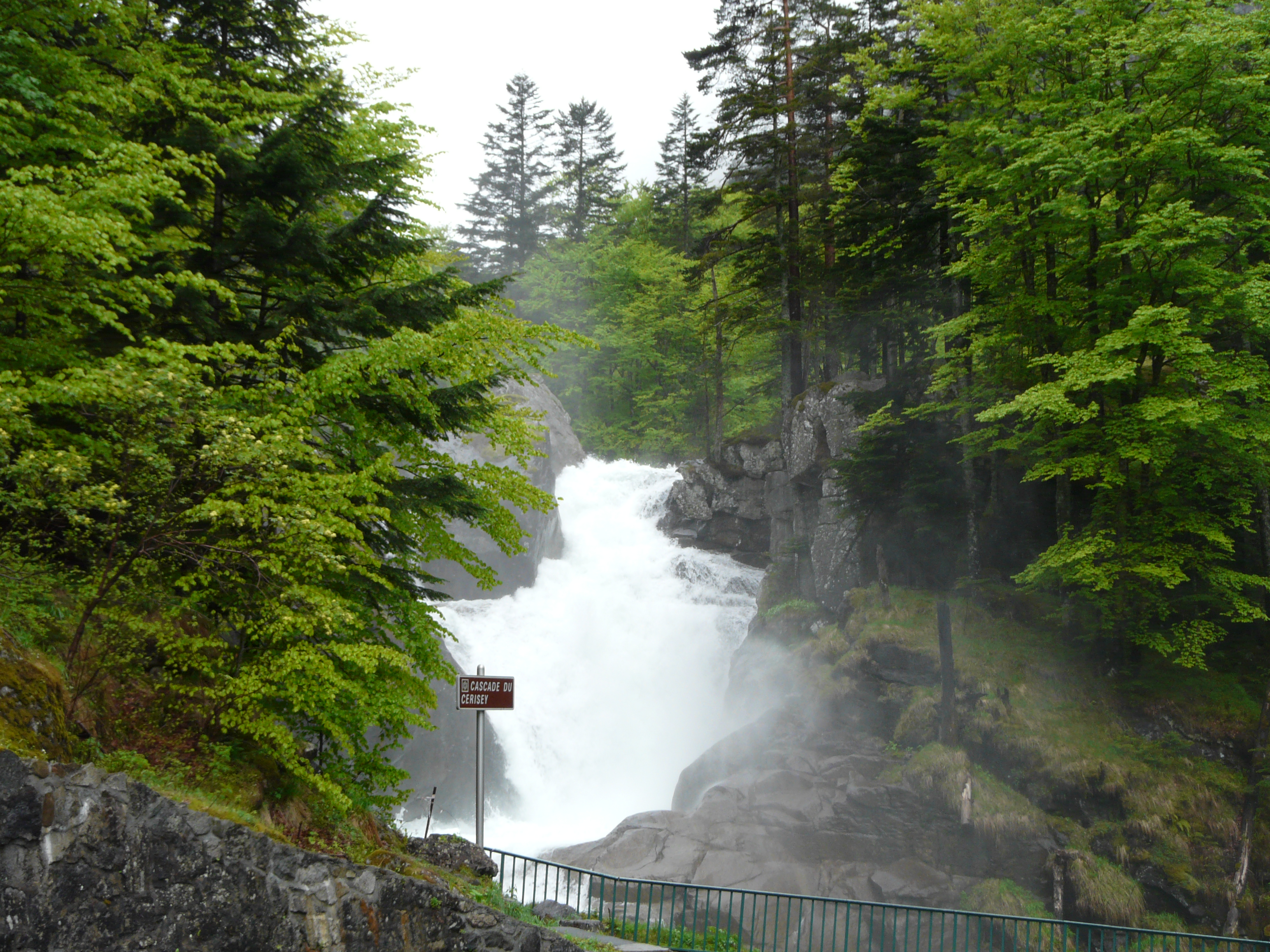
The Cerisey waterfall

== Notable people ==
- Victor Hugo wrote a poem about Cauterets included in the third book Les Luttes et les Rêves [The struggles and dreams] of Les Contemplations: L’enfant voyant l'aïeule... [The child saw the grandmother...] (25 August 1843).
- Giuseppe Verdi and Giuseppina Strepponi stayed in Cauterets during the summer of 1866, where the maestro pursued the composition of Don Carlos and tried to heal his chronic sore throat.
- Louis Varney (1844–1908), composer of operettas died here.
- Ralph Soupault (1904–1962), cartoonist in the collaborationist journal Je suis partout died in Cauterets on 12 August 1962.
- Sim (1926–2009), his real name Simon Jacques Eugène Berryer, was an actor, comedian and writer, born in Cauterets.
- On 17 November 2008, the military leader of ETA, Miguel Garikoitz Aspiazu Rubina, alias "Txeroki" [Cherokee], was arrested in Cauterets, bringing a severe blow to the Basque separatist organisation.
- Gaston Phébus, Marguerite de Navarre, Queen Hortense, the Duchess of Berry, George Sand, Alfred de Vigny, Chateaubriand and French baritone Ismaël have also stayed there.

== Cauterets in literature ==
- Cauterets provides the framework of the Heptaméron, an unfinished collection of short stories written by Marguerite de Navarre. Flood waters involuntarily retained ten ladies and gentlemen at Cauterets, who were having spa treatment. They decide to entertain by telling a story each day.

== Bibliography ==
- Flurin, René (1999). Histoire de Cauterets, des origines à nos jours [History of Cauterets, from its origins to the present day] (in French). Créer.
- Flurin, René (2010). Cauterets thermal au fil de l'histoire [Thermal Cauterets throughout history] (in French). Monhélios.
