= Pont d'Espagne =

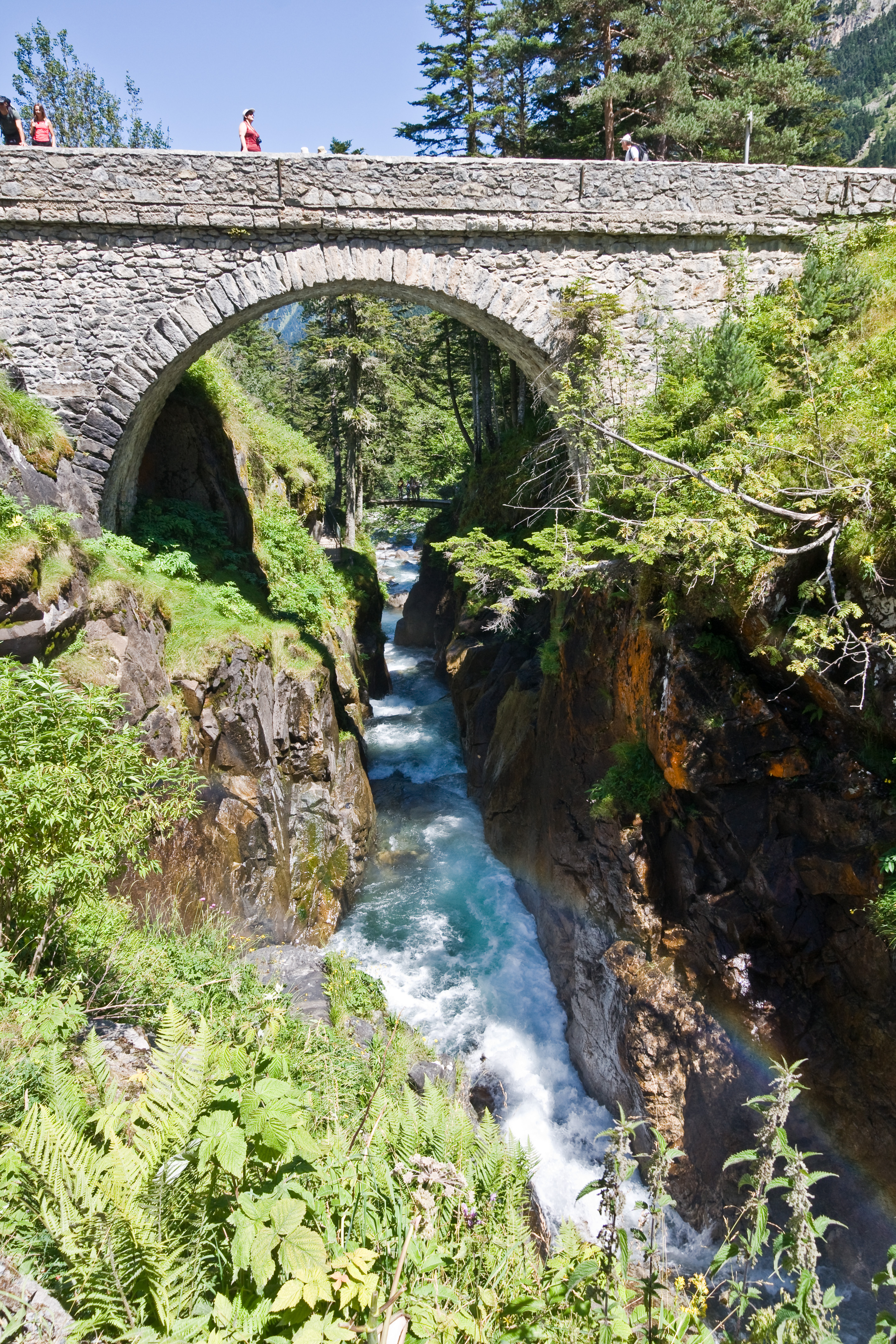
- Coordinates: 42°51′04″N 0°08′24″W

Location
- Interactive map of Pont d'Espagne

Pont d'Espagne is a stone-built bridge that spans the Gave de Marcadau at the point where it meets the Gave de Gaube, near one of its sources high in the French Pyrenees. It is a protected area of the Pyrénées in the Pyrénées National Park.

The Pont d'Espagne is at an altitude of approx 1500m. The name translates as Spanish Bridge. The bridge used to join Spain and France through the mountains.

Google Satellite Map

There is a car park nearby and it is possible to get to Lac de Gaube by ski lift.

The nearest towns are Cauterets and Lourdes.
