= Gaube Lake =

French glacial lake

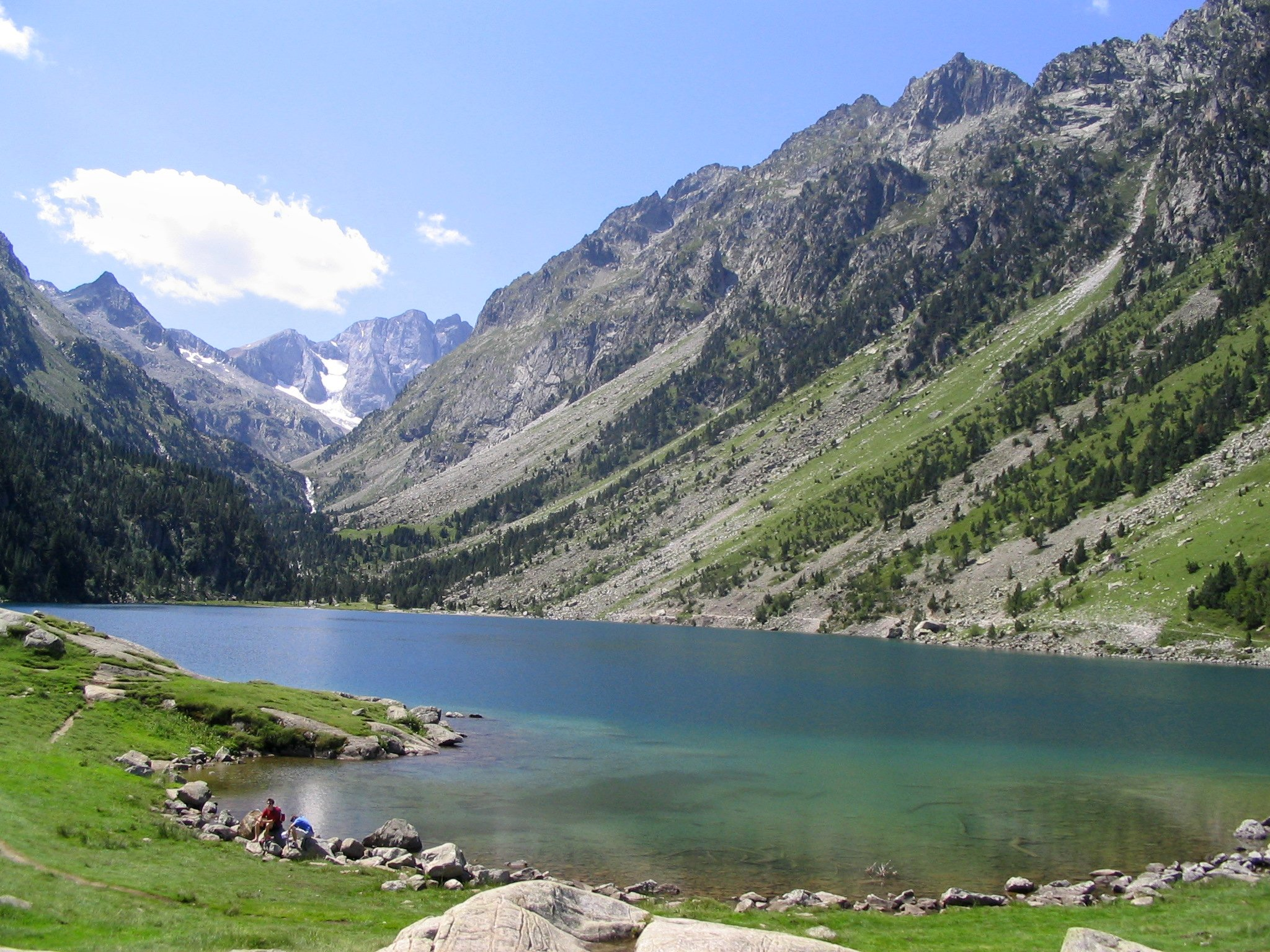
- View of the lake in summer with Vignemale in the background

- Location within Pyrenees
- Location: Hautes-Pyrénées
- Coordinates: 42.831138°N 0.139732°W
- Lake type: Glacial lake
- Primary inflows: Gaube River tributaries (Gave des oulettes de Gaube)
- Primary outflows: Gaube River
- Basin countries: France
- Surface area: 0.19 km^{2} (0.073 sq mi)
- Average depth: 40 m (130 ft)
- Surface elevation: 1,725 m (5,659 ft)

Gaube Lake (in French: Lac de Gaube) is a lake in the French Pyrenees, in the department of the Hautes-Pyrénées, near the town of Cauterets.

== Name ==
The lake's name is tautological, in that gaube in the Gascon language means "lake", hence the place name is "Lake Lake".

== Topography ==
The lake is situated in an altitude of 1725 m, an egg-shaped form stretching itself along a north–south axis in the valley of Gaube. This steep-sided valley is located at the foot of the Vignemale (3298M). The lake is surrounded by the peak Mayouret (2688 m) to the east, the big Peak of the Paloumères (2720 m) to the southeast, and the peak of Gaube (2377 m) to the northwest.

== Hydrography ==
Its principal inflows are the Gaube River tributaries (Gave des oulettes de Gaube), which take their name from the Gave de Gaube, which is the principal outflow of the lake. The lake has an average depth of 40m, surface area of 19 hectares, and more than 2 km of shoreline. A delta situated at the mouth of the principal outflow of the lake is loaded with glacial alluvial deposits.

== Geology ==
The shoreline and surrounding slopes are covered with various glacial rock formations.

== Access ==
The lake is accessible by an hour's hike through the forest, or by cable car from the Pont d'Espagne in the valley of Cauterets. It is famous for its panorama and relative ease of access. It is the departure point for many pedestrian hikes; its left shore is lined by the GR 10 leading towards the Gaube River tributaries.
