= Pierre Baldi (painter) =

French painter (1919–2022)

- Born: 18 January 1919; Anglet, France
- Died: 18 June 2022 (aged 103); Anglet, France
- Education: École de Peinture Décorative de Tours
- Occupation: Painter

Pierre Baldi (18 January 1919 – 18 June 2022) was a French painter. He studied at the École de Peinture Décorative de Tours.
