= Vignemale =

Summit in the Pyrenees on the Franco-Spanish border

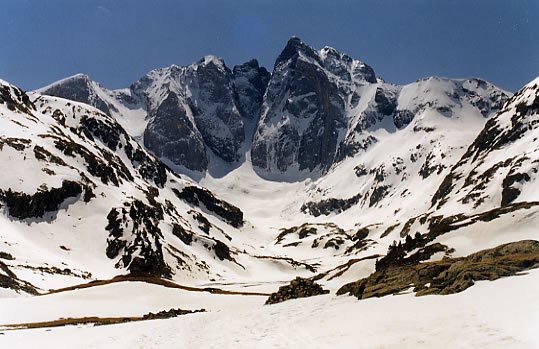
- Vignemale

Highest point
- Elevation: 3,298 m (10,820 ft)
- Prominence: 1,026 m (3,366 ft)
- Listing: Ribu
- Coordinates: 42°46′36″N 0°08′35″W

Geography
- Location within Pyrenees
- Location: Hautes-Pyrénées, France; Sobrarbe, Aragon, Spain
- Parent range: Pyrenees

Climbing
- First ascent: August 2, 1792
- Easiest route: Through the Ossoue glacier

The Vignemale (French pronunciation: [viɲmal]; Spanish: Viñamala, Occitan: Vinhamala, Aragonese: Comachibosa, Catalan: Vinyamala), at 3,298 metres, is the highest of the French Pyrenean summits (the highest in the whole of the range is the Aneto). It lies on the border between the Department of Hautes-Pyrénées (Nauts Pirenèus / Hauts Pirenèus), in Occitanie and Gascony, France and Sobrarbe, in Huesca, Aragon, Spain, and the peak is split between the two countries.

The Vignemale is the name given to the mountain massif in French, which also straddles into Spain. It consists of several distinct summits, the predominant ones being Grand Vignemale or Pique-Longue (in French) / Pica Longa (in Occitan and Catalan) / Punda de Comabichosa (in Aragonese) (3298 m), Pointe Chausenque / Punta Chausenca (3,204 m) and Petit Vignemale / Petita Vinhamala (3,032 m). The Vignemale is also the site of the second largest of the Pyrenean glaciers (after the one on Aneto), the Ossoue / Osso (with around 0.6 km^{2}), across which the "voie normale", or standard route to the summit travels.

One of its aspects is the North Face upon which lie a number of serious ascent routes requiring skill and commitment. Below the North Face is the mountain refuge - the Refuge des Oulettes de Gaube / Refugi d’eths Oletas de Gauba. The approach from the north entails a walk up to and around the picturesque Lac de Gaube / Gauba giving views of the mountain.

Almost synonymous with the Vignemale is the name of Count Henry Russell, an eccentric of the Victorian era who developed a lifelong passion for the mountain.

It appears that the first ascent of the Vignemale was made by some shepherds who participated in the geodesic expedition of Louis-Philippe Reinhart Junker in 1792. The first official ascent was made by the mountain guide Henri Cazaux and his brother-in-law on 8 October 1837. One year later, the first documented ascent of this peak was by English landowner and traveller Anne Lister and three local guides, including the mountain guide Cazaux.

== Gallery ==
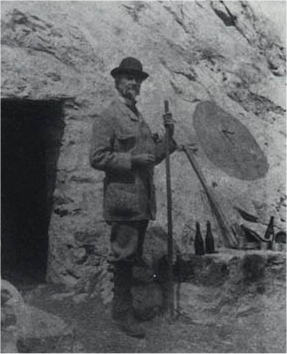
Count Henry Russell in front of one of his caves on the Vignemale
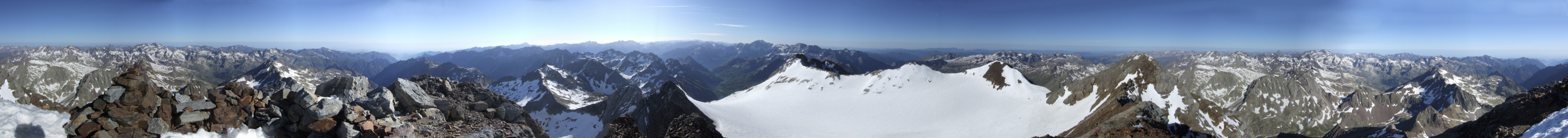
360° top view
