= Petit Vignemale =

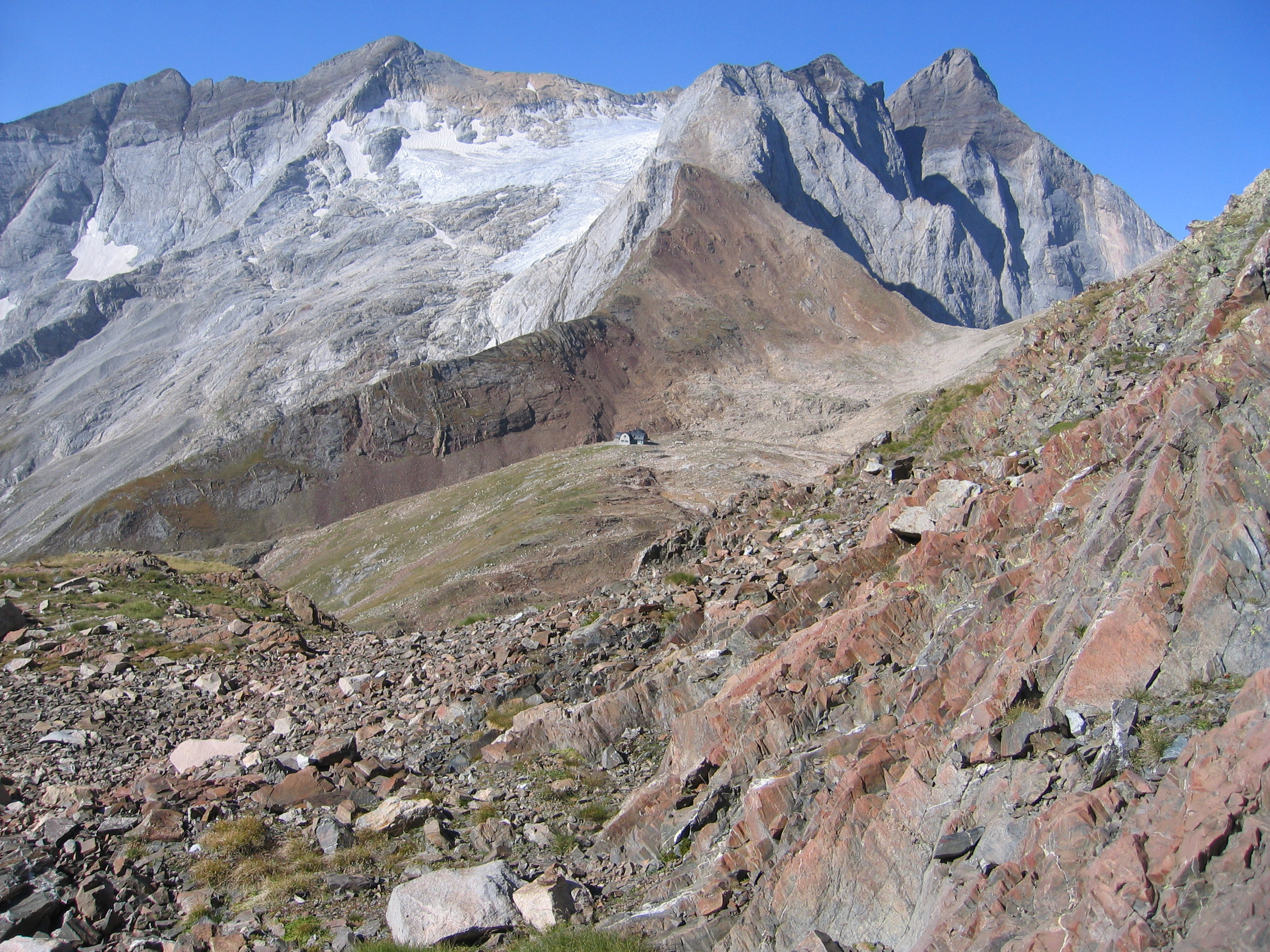
- Petit Vignemale (3032 m) au centre, col de la Hourquette d'Ossoue à droite (2 734 m), vue partielle du glacier d'Ossoue (Photo prise du col de Labas)

Highest point
- Elevation: 3,032 m (9,948 ft)
- Listing: List of Pyrenean three-thousanders
- Coordinates: 42°46′29″N 0°08′05″E

Geography
- Location within Pyrenees
- Location: Hautes-Pyrénées, France
- Region: Midi-Pyrénées
- Parent range: Massif du Vignemale (Pyrenees)

Geology
- Rock age: Praguien - Emsien

Climbing
- First ascent: August 1798 by La Baumelle

The Petit Vignemale is a summit in the French Pyrenees in the massif du Vignemale. Access is possible either by the Gaube valley (beyond Cauterets), or la vallée d'Ossoue.

== Toponymy ==
Vignemale is a tautological compound of two pre-Indo-European vin and mal both meaning « mountain ».

== Geography ==
Le Petit Vignemale is located in the Hautes-Pyrénées department, near Cauterets and Gavarnie arrondissement of Argelès-Gazost in the Pyrenees National Park.

== Geology ==
The summit is composed of sediment masses from the early Devonian period.

== Climbing ==
The first ascent was made in August 1798 by La Baumelle.

Access

Two routes :

- normal route (hiking);
- north harbor (climbing).
