= Adast =

- Commune
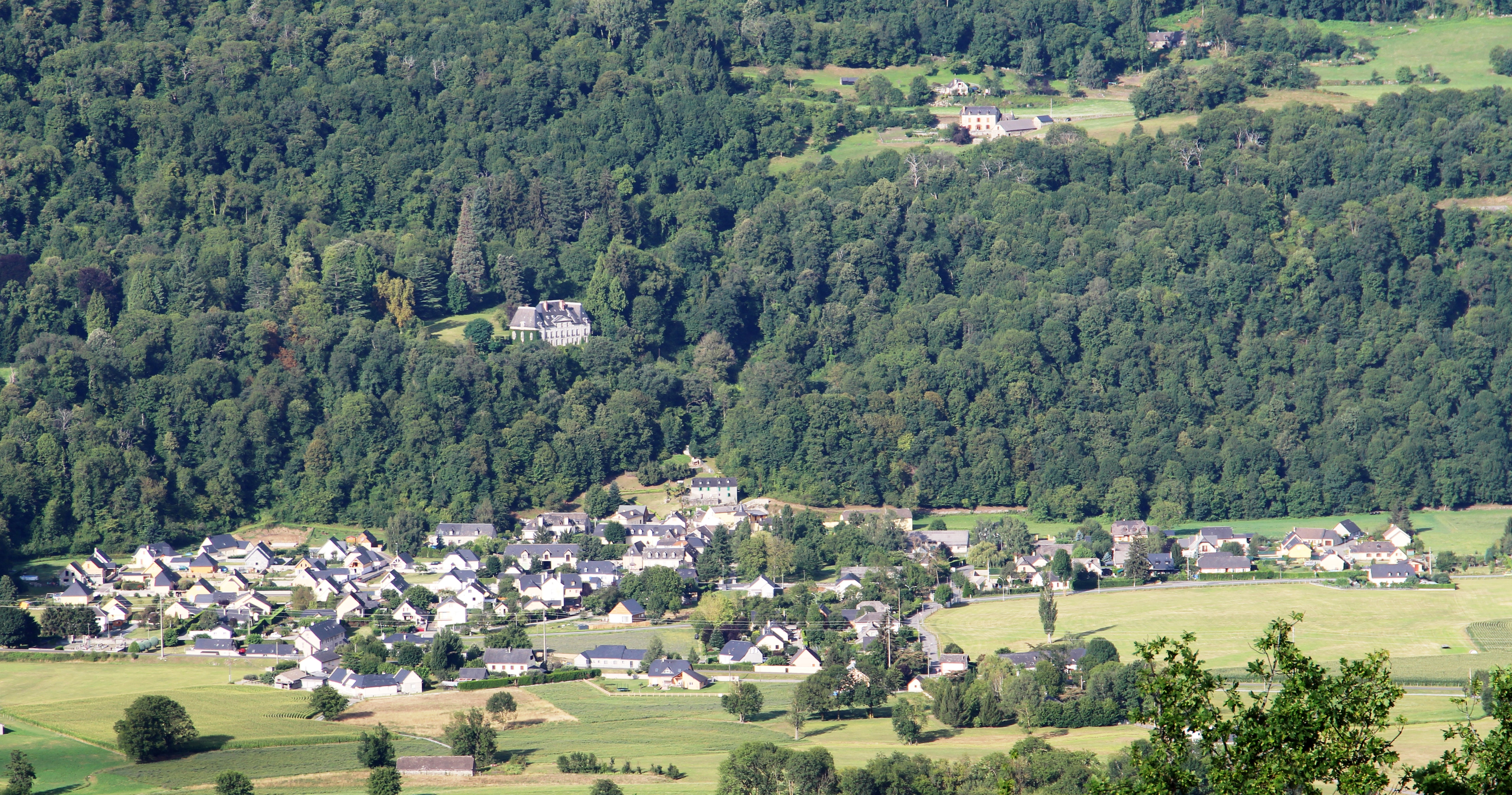
- View of the village

- Coat of arms
- Location of Adast
- Location within France Location within Occitanie
- Coordinates: 42°58′29″N 0°04′36″W
- Country: France
- Region: Occitania
- Department: Hautes-Pyrénées
- Arrondissement: Argelès-Gazost
- Canton: La Vallée des Gaves
- Intercommunality: Pyrénées Vallées des Gaves

Government
  - Mayor (2020–2026): Serge Laguibeau
- Area^{1}: 1.05 km^{2} (0.41 sq mi)
- Elevation: 444 m (1,457 ft)
- Highest elevation: 542 m (1,778 ft)
- Lowest elevation: 434 m (1,424 ft)
- Population (2023): 299
  - Density: 285/km^{2} (738/sq mi)
- Time zone: UTC+01:00 (CET)
  - Summer (DST): UTC+02:00 (CEST)
- INSEE/Postal code: 65001 /65260
- ^{1} French Land Register data, which excludes lakes, ponds, glaciers > 1 km^{2} (0.386 sq mi or 247 acres) and river estuaries.

Adast is a village and commune in the Hautes-Pyrénées department in southwestern France. It is in Sent Savin valley in the Bigorre region.

== Geography ==
The commune is bordered by four other communes. It also borders Lau-Balagnas by a simple quadripoint: Saint-Savin to the west, Lau-Balagnas by a quadripoint to the north, Beaucens to the east, and finally by Pierrefitte-Nestalas to the south.

== Population ==
Historical population
Year	Pop.	±% p.a.
1968	174	—
1975	200	+2.01%
1982	205	+0.35%
1990	203	−0.12%
1999	227	+1.25%
2007	244	+0.91%
2012	273	+2.27%
2017	292	+1.35%
2023	299	+0.40%
Source: INSEE

== Sites and monuments ==
In 1270, the Château de Miramont was bequeathed after the death of Mathe de Bigorre-Mâtas to one of his daughters, Marguerite.

In the 17th century, it became the refuge of the poet Cyprian Despourrins whose mother was Gabrielle de Miramont. The castle was then bought by Bernard Abadie-Gaye, an inhabitant of Sazos (near Luz-Saint-Sauveur). It was then sold by a descendant of this family, Célestin Carrere, son of Louise Abadie-Gaye, in 1914.

The château was later inhabited by Dr. Jean François Calot (1861-1944), a surgeon who advanced orthopaedic surgery preferring conservative treatments to the systematic amputations. He spent his entire career from 1890 at Berck and he retired to the Château de Miramont.

At the end of the 1960s, the Château de Miramont was bought by the journalist, radio and television host Jacques Chancel, who came from the nearby village of Ayzac-Ost.

== See also ==
- Communes of the Hautes-Pyrénées department
