= Abbey of Saint-Savin-en-Lavedan =

Church and former abbey in Hautes-Pyrénées, France

Coordinates: 42.9817°N 0.0912°W

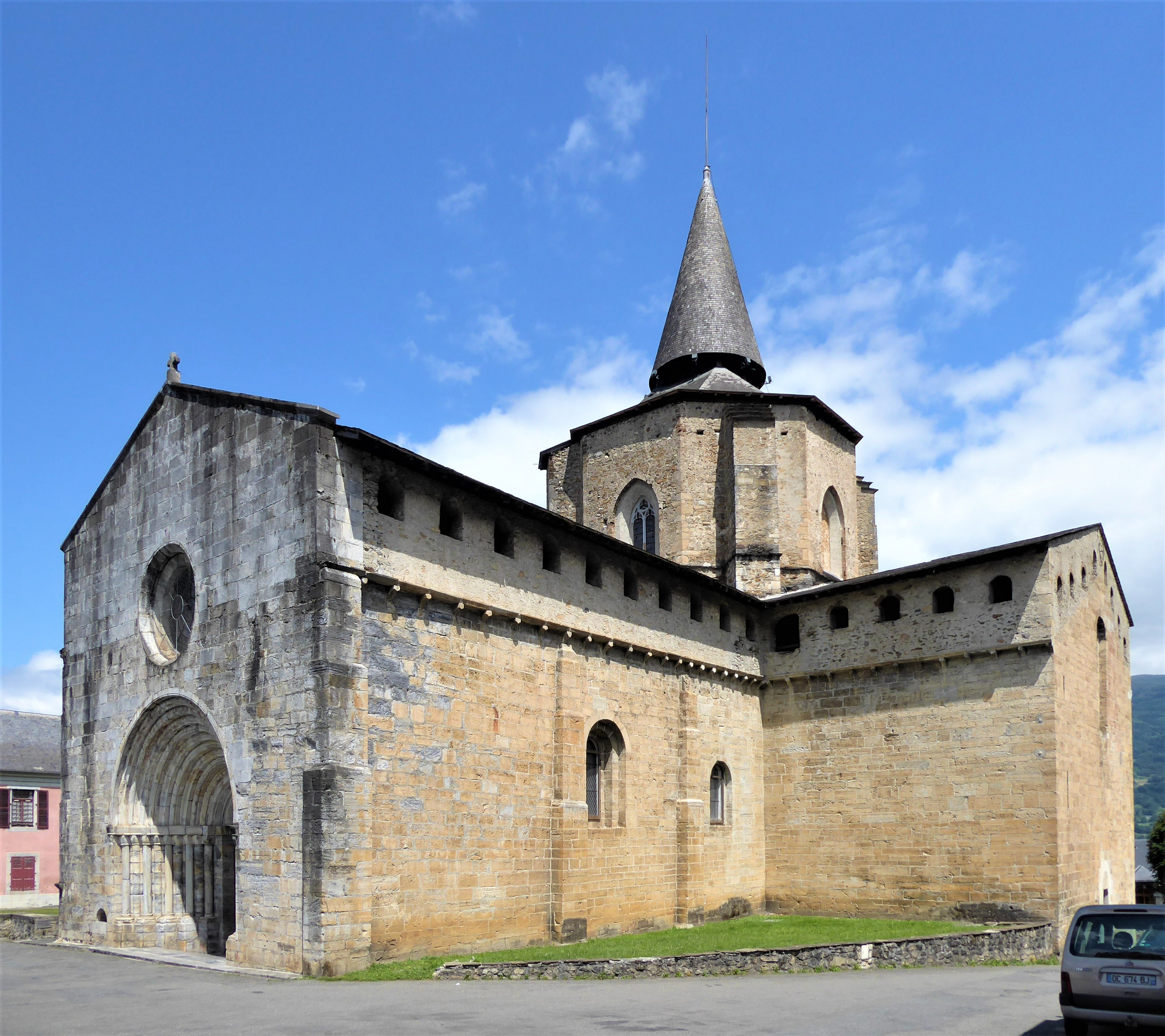
Former abbey church

The Abbey of Saint-Savin-en-Lavedan (French: Abbaye de Saint-Savin-en-Lavedan; Latin: [Abbatia] Santi Savini di Bigorra or Santi Savini Levitanensis) was a Benedictine abbey in the commune of Saint-Savin, Hautes-Pyrénées, France. It was one of the most important religious centres in the County of Bigorre. The Romanesque abbey church remains, in use since 1790 as a parish church. It has been listed since 1840 as a monument historique by the French Ministry of Culture.

== History ==
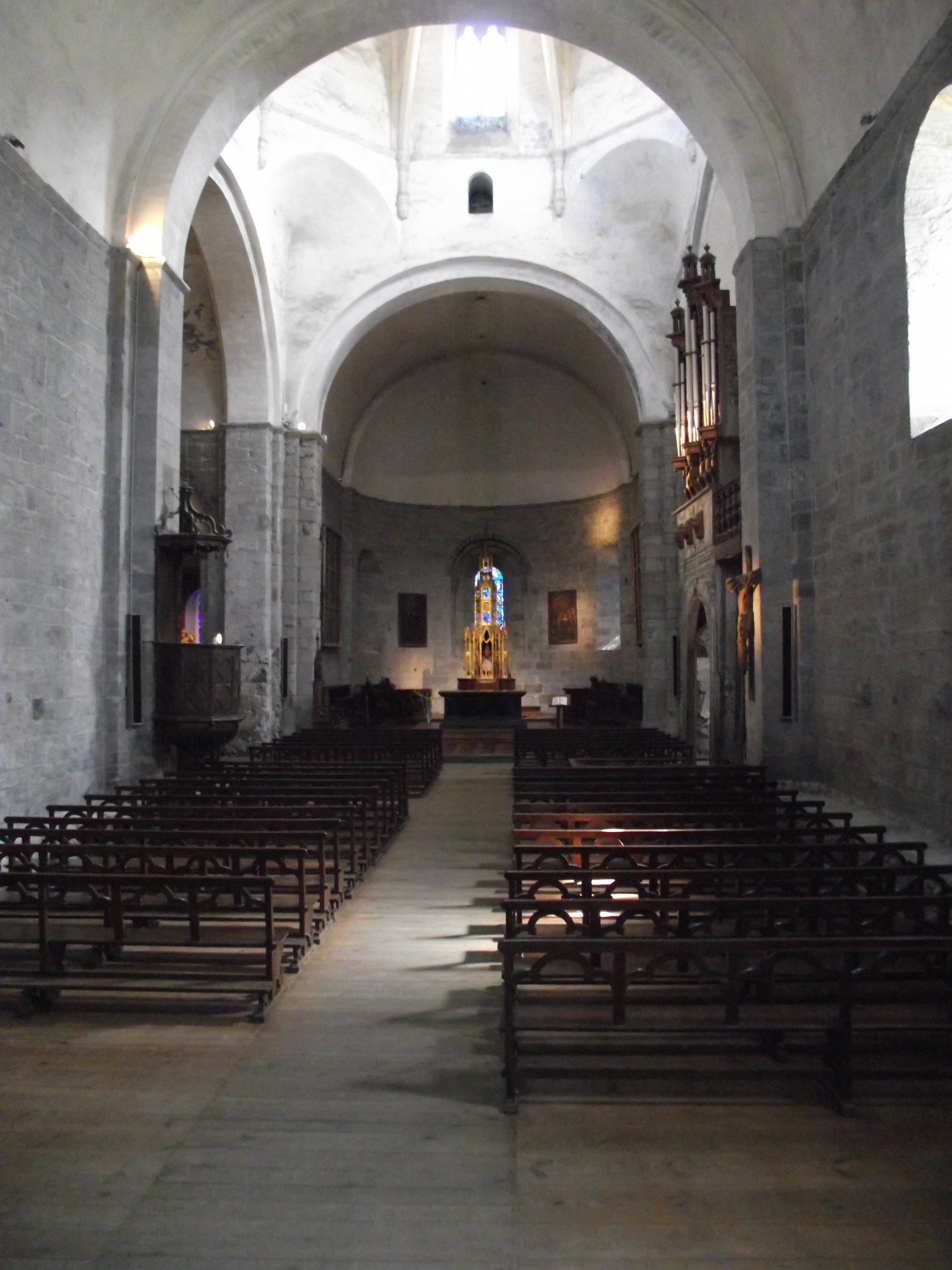
Nave of the abbey church

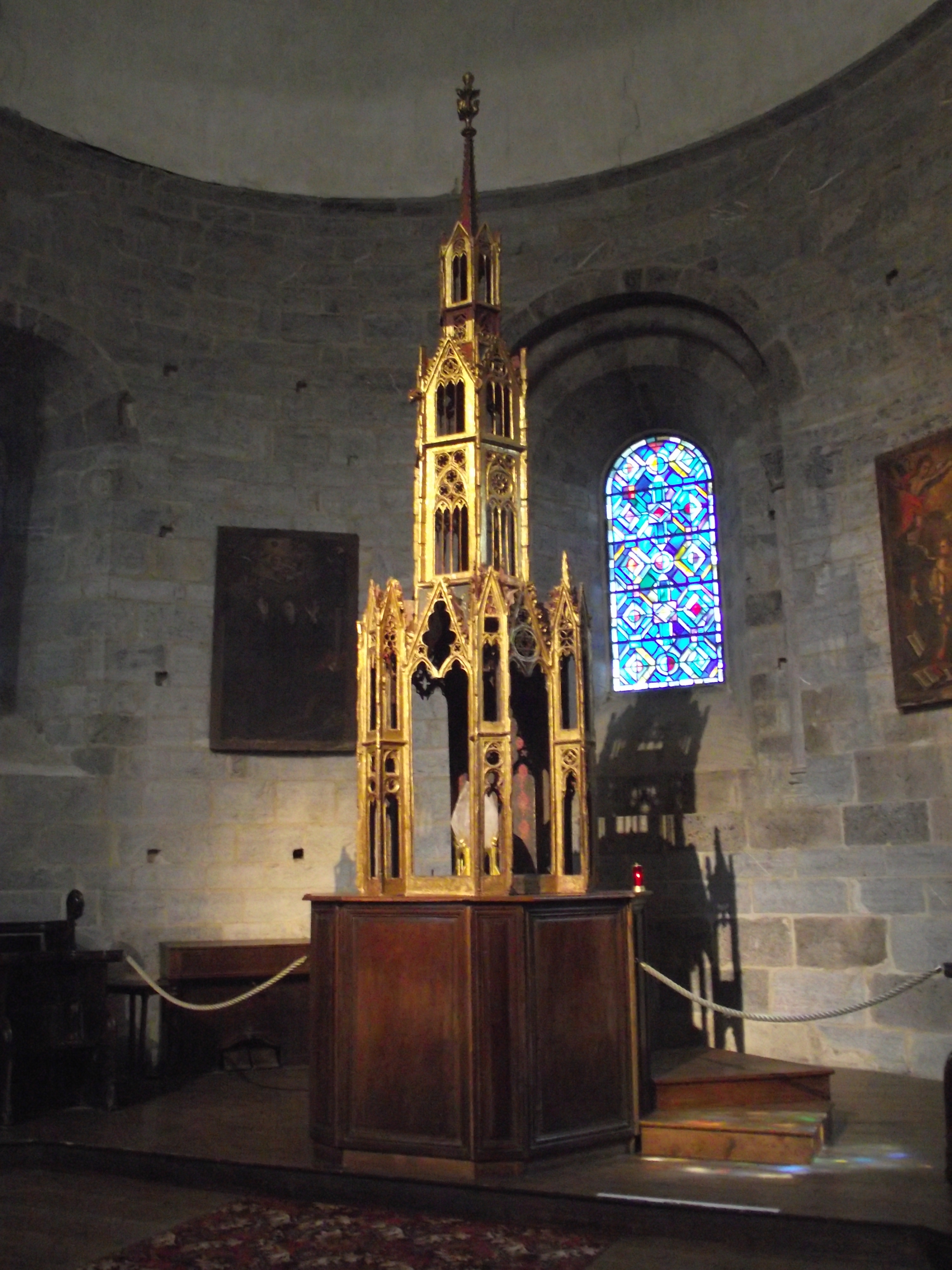
Tabernacle

The abbey dates at least from the 10th century, and it was built by order of Charlemagne on the site of an ancient Gallo-Roman fortress called Palatium Æmilianum ("Palace of Emilianus").

From no later than the time of the Congregation of St. Maur, the abbey possessed a coat of arms.

According to Pulci's poem Il Morgante maggiore, Roland, protagonist of the Chanson de Roland was in the abbey at some point.

In 841, the abbey was looted and burnt by the Normans, and previously by the Saracens.

In 945, Count Raymond I of Bigorre gave the abbey a generous endowment consisting of a territory known as thePascal de Saint-Savin , which was made of the eight villages of Saint-Savin (Sen Sabi), Castet, Lau (Laou), Balagnas, Adast (Adas), Nestalas, Soulom and Uz; the church of Saint-Jean-de-Saint-Savin became their communal church.

In 1080 the abbey was united to the Abbey of St. Victor, Marseille.

In 1130 Bernard d'Arcizas and Centule II, Count of Bigorre, confronted the abbot and the inhabitants of the Val d'Azun over a burial.

Queen Marguerite of Navarre (1492–1549) took refuge in the abbey from a flood.

From the thirteenth century, the abbey still controlled the territory of seven villages.

From the 16th century the abbey suffered due to the destruction associated with the French Wars of Religion and relaxed its discipline, although there were attempts to restore it in the 17th century by the monks of the Congregation of St. Maur.

Only three monks remained living in the abbey in 1790. In the following year, the church and the monastic buildings were converted for the use of the parish. Part of the abbey was sold for a stone quarry and the chapter house became a stable. In 1854, a strong earthquake caused further destructions. Prosper Mérimée took charge of its restoration in 1855.

== Goods and tithes ==
The House of Arcizac, or d'Arcizas from Arcizans-Dessus or Arcizans-Avant, played a key part in the enrichment of the abbey.

In 1083 Raymond-Arnaud d'Arcizas and Raymond de Vieusac witnessed the gift of the tithes of Azos by Arnaud de Tors.

In 1130 Pierre de Silhen and his sons gave the tithes of the church of Silhen to the abbey.

In 1157 Arnaud d'Arcizas witnessed the gift made by Gailliarde d'Orout of lands in Uz to the abbey.

== Abbots ==
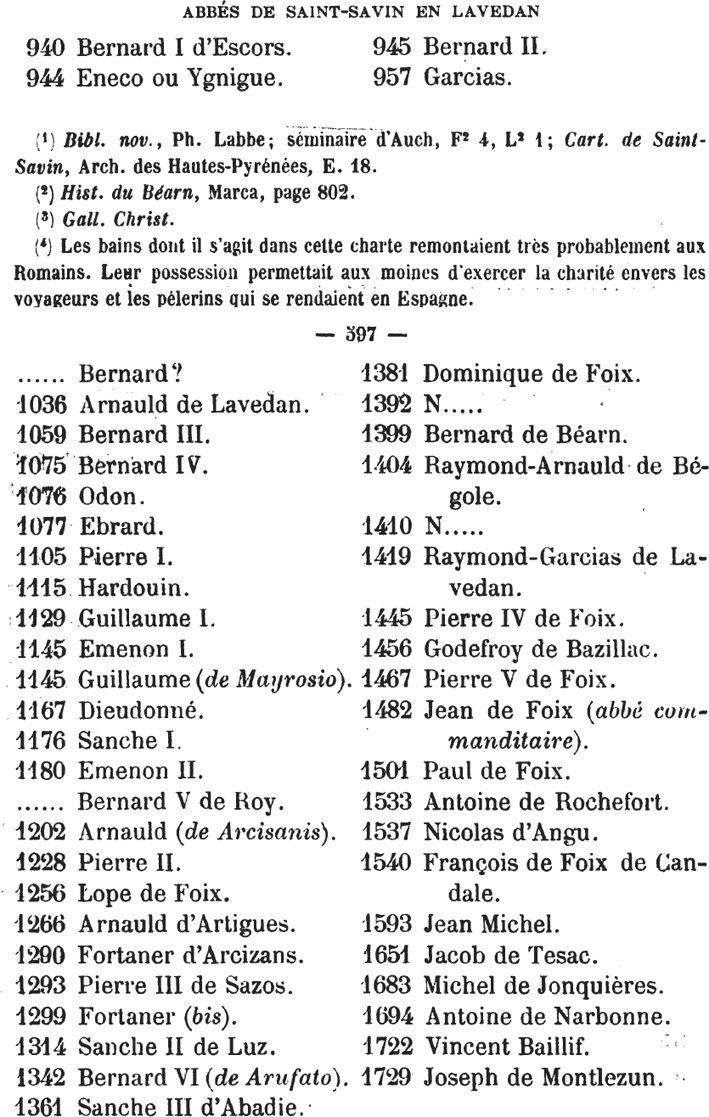
List of Abbots

The list of abbots begins in 945 with Eneco d'Ygnigue, or possibly with Bernard I d'Escors in 940. A list is given at Gallica.

== Organ ==
The abbey church houses an organ first built by an unknown builder in 1557, during the time of abbot François de Foix Candale. The organ was rebuilt by Antoine Riballier in 1618, but was abandoned during the French Revolution, and robbed of its pipework. In 1994 the regional arts body decided to restore the instrument to its original state. The restored organ has sideways-moving stop levers rather than conventional knobs, and eight ranks of pipes (including a régale with bamboo resonators), the Montre being divided into treble and bass. The keyboard compass is from F1 to A4, 38 notes, lacking the bottom F#, G# and top G#. The pitch is lower than modern concert pitch, at A = 365 Hz, and the organ is tuned in mean-tone temperament. The case of the organ is historically interesting for its paintings, carvings and ornaments, which include three masks with mechanical eyes and jaws, moveable by the organist.

== Gallery ==
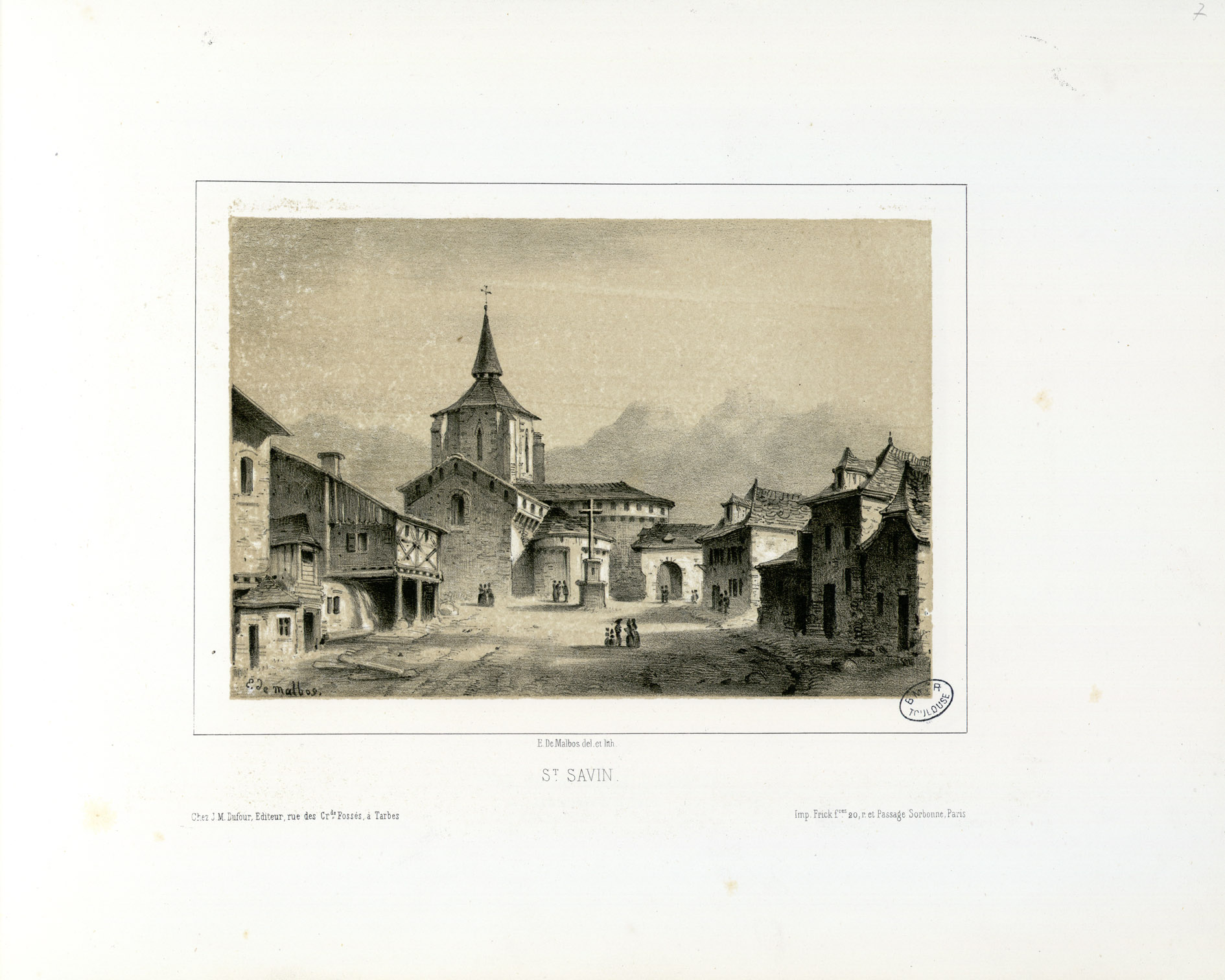
Saint-Savin: lithograph by Eugène de Malbos (1811–1855)

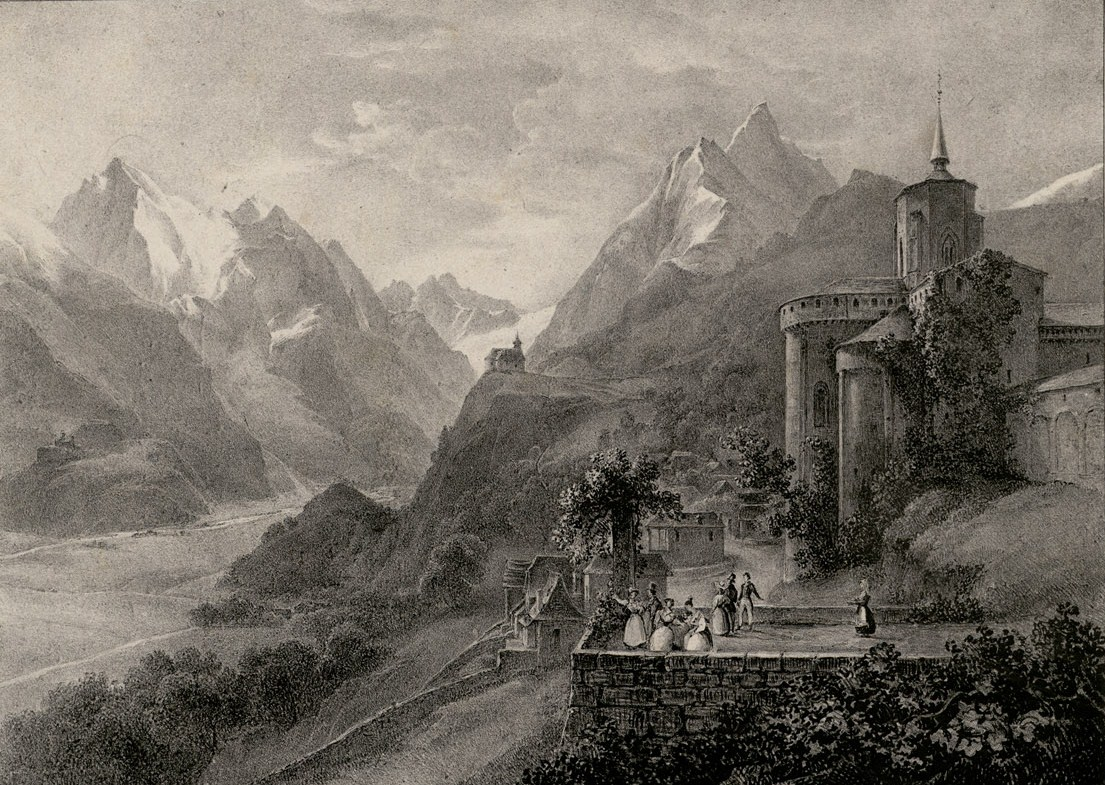
Saint-Savin: lithograph by Joséphine Sarazin de Belmont (1790–1870)

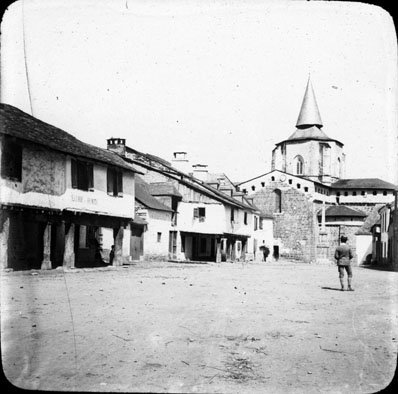
Saint-Savin (Hautes-Pyrénées) in the second half of the nineteenth century (photo)

== Contact details ==
Abbatiale de Saint-Savin, 9 place du Castet, 65400 Saint-Savin-en-Lavedan (tel: 05.62.97.02.23)

== Bibliography ==
- Europeana database, Charles Durier (1854–1887): Cartulaire de l'abbaye des bénédictins de Saint-Savin en Lavedan. Sur Gallica en licence domaine Public.
- Gustave Bascle de Lagrèze, Monographie de Saint-Savin de Lavedan, Paris 1850.
