= Escors =

Family name

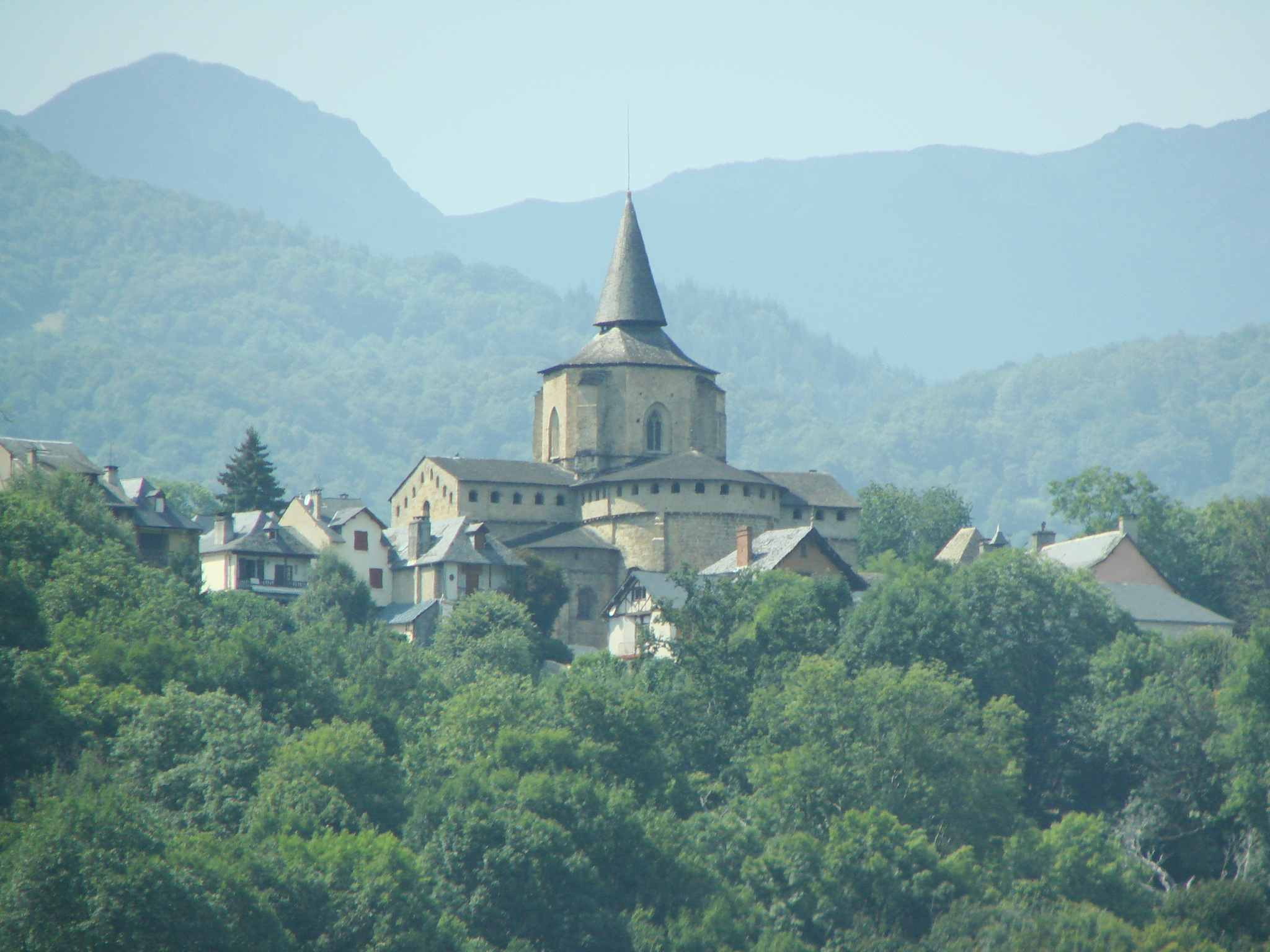
SAINT-SAVIN EN LAVEDAN ABBEY

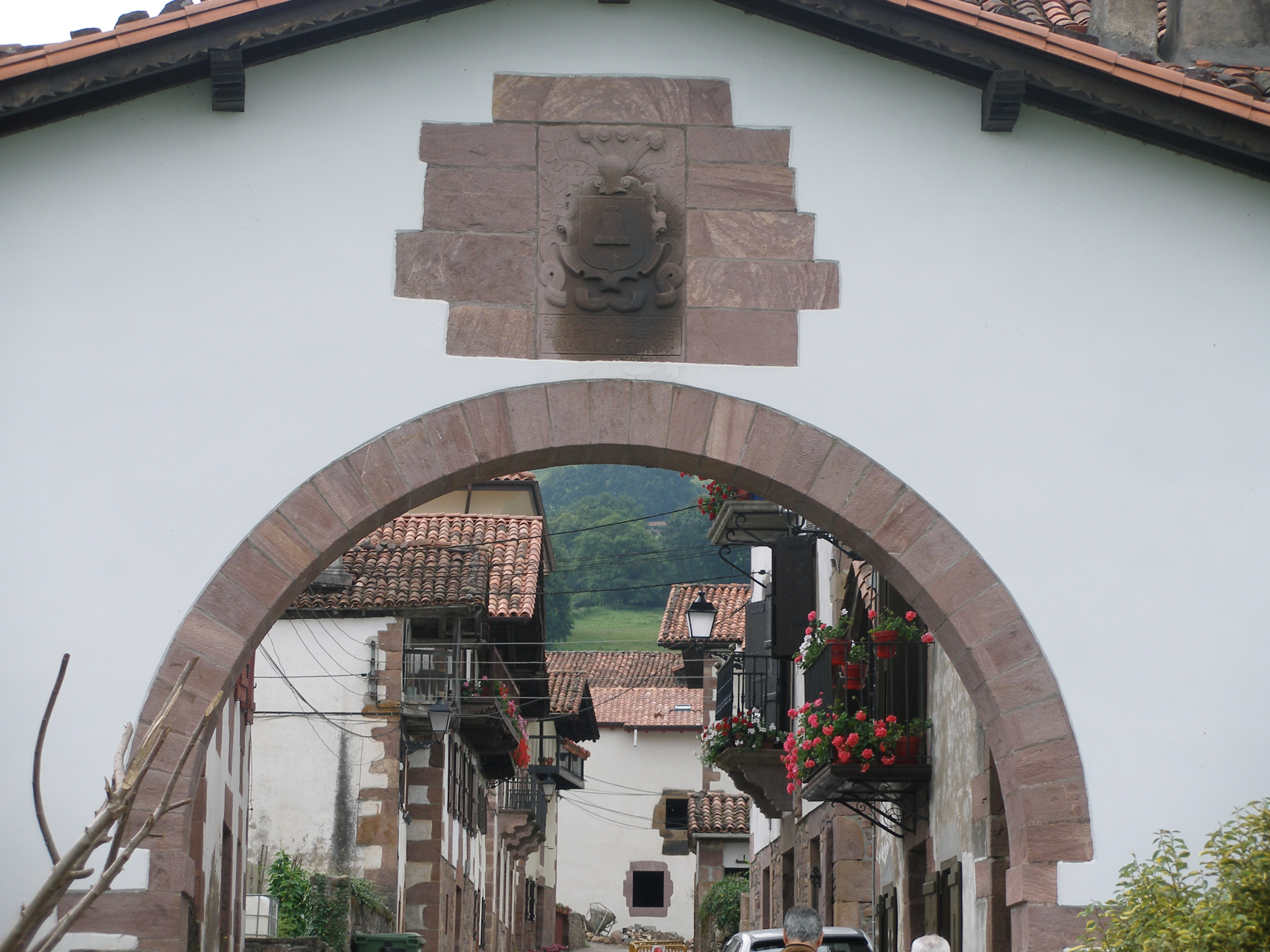
Main entrance to Maya, Navarre, with coat of arms

Escors or de Cors, is a family name of French origin, probably from the region of Aquitaine or Gascony, that moved to Navarre. "Escors" is related to other Occitan surnames from Aquitaine (Descors, Escars) and present-day Catalonia (Escorsell, Escorsa) that derived from "Cors-Cortis". The name "Cors" permanently incorporated the Occitan medieval demonstrative article "Es-" between the 10th and 12th centuries (Es-Cors/ Es-Corz). Many typographic variants can be found in the documents of the Kingdom of Navarre (Escorsi, Escorssi, Escorçi and Escorçy, d'Escourçy, de Corçy, d'Estorçy), or in the Gascon Rolls (Descorce, Descoce, Descorse, De Schours).

This family moved to Navarre in 1234 following the House of Champagne when they took over the Kingdom of Navarre. Some members of the family served as military personnel and administrators. It is likely that they settled in the village of Maya (Amaiur in euskera) in the Baztan Valley (Navarre).

The Escors family was closely related to other French families (Ségur and Bourg) and maybe to Baztanese families such as Borda, Maya, Echenique, Uharrichena (Oharrichena/Ocharrichena), Baztan, and Goyeneche if indeed the Escors settled in Maya as the "Escorz" family

== Documented members ==
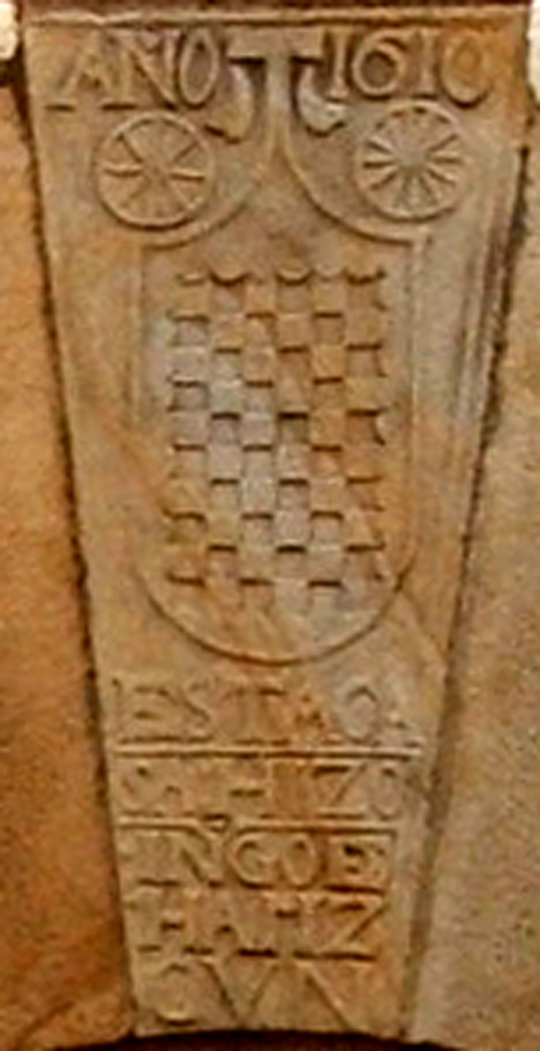
Coat of arms, House of Escors, Maya, Baztan

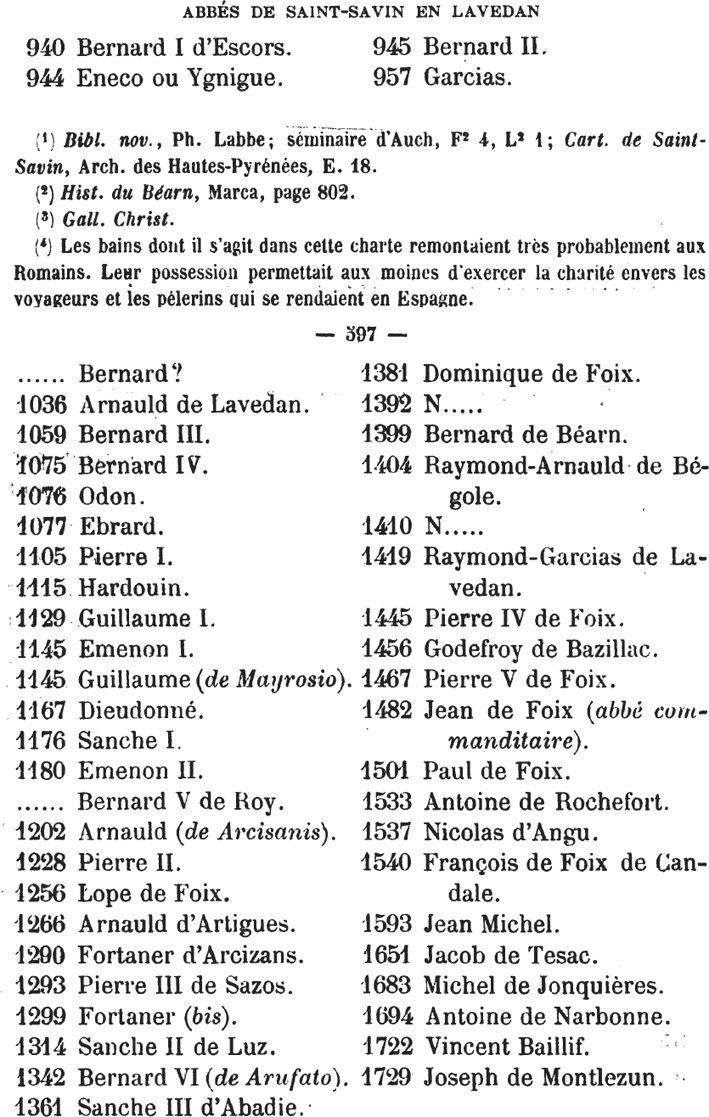
List of Abbots of Saint-Savin En Lavedan's abbey

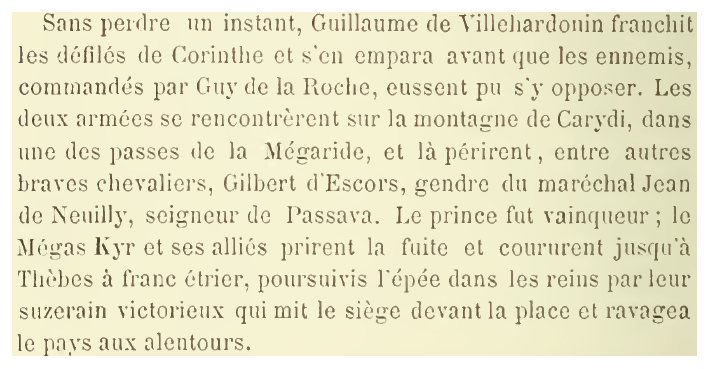
Fragment from L'Achaïe féodale: étude sur le moyen âge en Grèce (1205-1456), published 1886

=== Bernard I d'Escors ===
Bernard I d'Escors was an abbot of Saint Savin-en Lavedan's Abbey and the oldest documented member Saint-Savin-En-Lavedan (940-946), Bernard I d'Escors. The Abbey of Saint Savin-en-Lavedan is a benedictine monastery built during Charlemange's conquests in the South of France, in the County of Bigorre (Duchy of Aquitaine). It is still present in Saint Savin-en-Lavedan after a major restoration that took place in 1855. It is unclear whether Bernard I d'Escors was the first Abbot from 940-944 AD as it appears in some documents, or even if he was a member of the clergy. In the Saint Savin-en Lavedan's Meillon and Duriers' cartulaires, he is not listed as the first Abbot, and they even raise doubts about his existence. However, it is known that Bernard was possibly associated to the Abbey from 945-957 AD through records of his various donations in favour of the Convent.

=== Guibert de Cors ===
According to the Chronicle of the Morea, Gilbert de Cors was a baron of the Principality of Achaea and considered by some later historians as Lord of Lisarea. Gilbert d'Escors was married to Margaret of Nully, daughter of the Lord of Passavas John of Nully. Gilbert de Cors is also mentioned in the Aragonese version of the Chronicle of Morea in the list of fiefs, although a specific name for his fief is not given. It is also mentioned there that he built the Castle of Mitopoli. He died in the battle of Mount Carydi (1258) in Greece, and some late French documents name Gilbert de Cors as Gilbert d´Escors. His descendant Margaret of Baux married Peter of Luxembourg. Although this genealogy is widely accepted, it depends on whether Gilbert was the father of a lady of Lisarea called Marguerite (or Jeanne), who married Geoffrey of Briel, a hypothesis challenged by the historian of the medieval Peloponnese, Antoine Bon.

=== Gofredo de Escors / Jofre d'Escors / Jofre de Escors ===
Gofredo de Escors was the Castellan and Merino of Estella from 1282 to 1286.

=== Maestre Simon d'Escorsi ===
Maestre Simon d’Escors is extensively documented with multiple surname variations including d´Éscors / d'Escorsi / d'Escorssi / d'Escorçi / d'Escorçy / d'Escourçy / d'Esconu/de Escorri / de Storti / de Escociaco / Descorti. He was the Abbot of Falces (Navarre), Judge of the High Court of Navarre ("Cort") Lieutenant, and Counsellor of Charles II of Navarre (1332-1387).

Simon d´Escorcy was a controversial figure with judicial processes in France and Navarre. Simon d'Escorsi participated in the execution of Charles II's testament (1387).

=== Andres Escors Garrucho ===
Andres Escors Garrucho (1875–1947), industrialist and Republican Mayor of Arcos de la Frontera (Cádiz, 1931–36). Because of his contributions during his mandate as a Republican mayor, a street in Arcos de la Frontera was named after him.

== Coats of arms ==
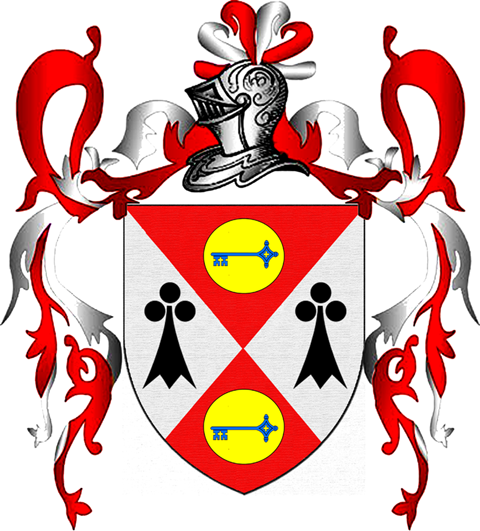
Coat of arms, Navarrese branch, Jaime de Querexeta

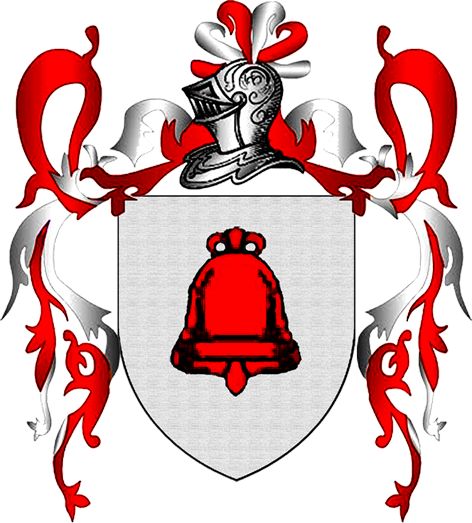
Coat of arms, Navarrese branch (Maya), Endika de Mogrobejo

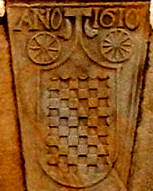
Coat of arms, Navarrese branch (Arizcun), Real Compañía de Guardias Marinas y Colegio Naval, Endika de Mogrobejo

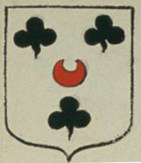
Coat of arms, Champagne branch, Armorial Général de France

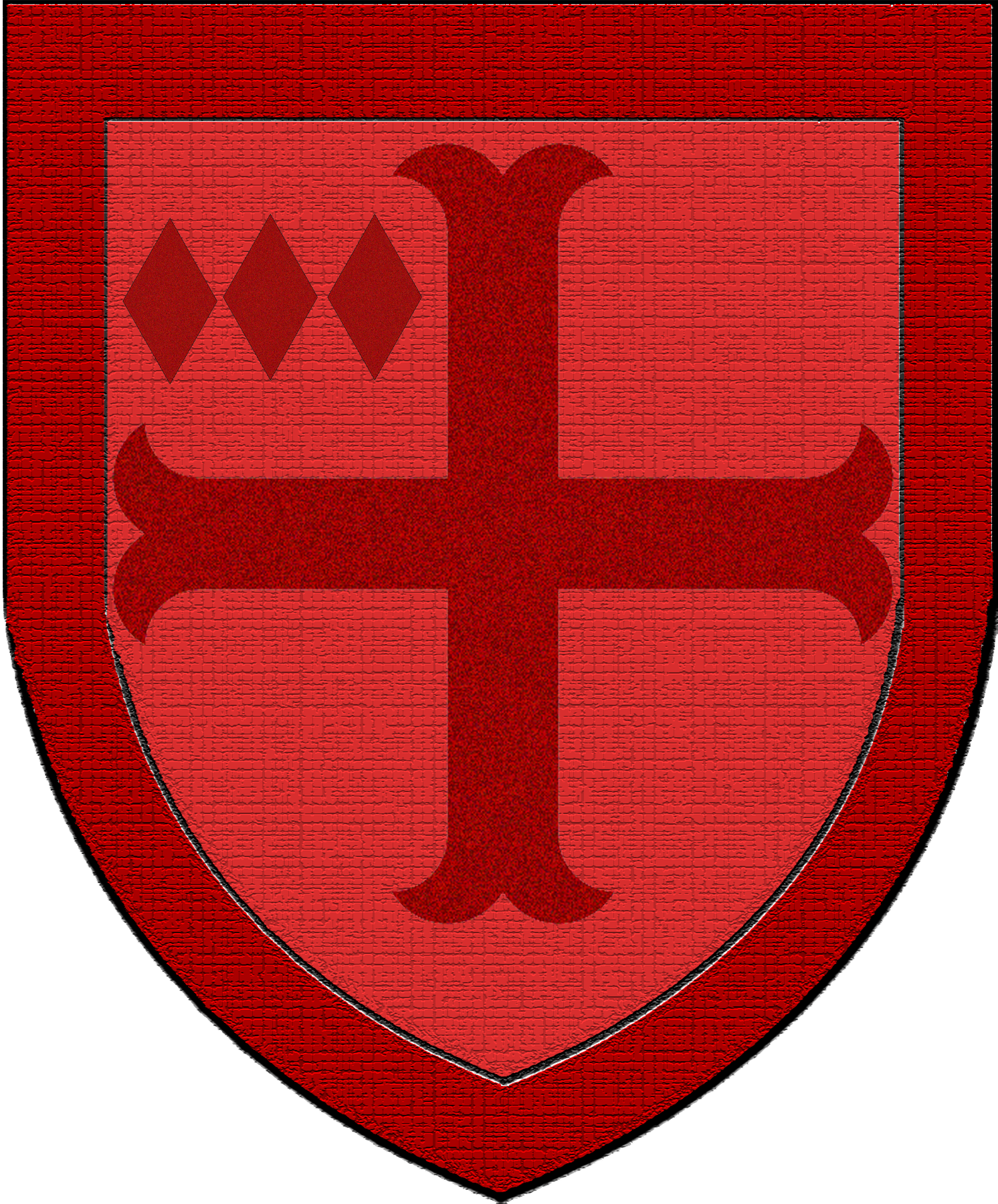
Coat of arms, Simon d'Escorsi

Simon d'Escorsi's seal, 1366-1391

== Downloads ==
- "The Feudal Achaea" by Diane de Guldencrone, original book, University of Michigan
- "Mémoires de Messire Philippe de Mornay"
