= Guibert of Cors =

French knight

Guibert of Cors (French: Gilbert d'Escors/de Cors; died 1258) was a French knight and Baron of Mitopoli in the Principality of Achaea. Guibert was married to Margaret of Passavant, daughter of the Lord of Passavas John of Nully. He was killed in 1258 in the Battle of Karydi.
