= Barony of Passavant =

European feudal state

- Barony of the Principality of Achaea
- c. 1220–c. 1263
- Map of the Peloponnese with its principal locations during the late Middle Ages
- Capital: Passavant Castle
- Area
  - Coordinates: 36°43′N 22°30′E
  - Type: Feudal lordship
- Historical era: Middle Ages
  - Established: 12 December
  - Byzantine reconquest: 12 December 1263
Succeeded by
Despotate of the Morea

The Barony of Passavant or Passava was a medieval Frankish fiefdom of the Principality of Achaea, located in the mountains between the Mani peninsula and the plain of Laconia, in the Peloponnese peninsula in Greece, centred on the fortress of Passavant or Passava (Greek: Πασσαβάς). It was among the twelve original baronies of the Principality of Achaea, but was conquered by the Byzantines in the early 1260s.

== History ==
The Barony of Passavant was the last of the original twelve secular baronies of the Principality of Achaea to be established. While most of the others were formed c. 1209, after the conquest of the peninsula by the Crusaders, Passavant was created shortly after 1218/20 for the French knight John de Nully. He established the fortress of Passavant or Passava—the name probably derives from the war-cry or family motto "passe avant", but is also found as a toponym in northeastern France—on the mountains between the Mani peninsula and the plain of Laconia. John of Nully is generally supposed to have been the son of Vilain of Nully, a native of Nully and close friend of the historian Geoffrey of Villehardouin. John did not take the cross until 1218, and arrived in the Peloponnese probably not until 1220. His barony probably comprised newly conquered land—it was not until c. 1248, with the fall of the last Byzantine fortress, Monemvasia, that Laconia was fully pacified—with four knight's fiefs. It was militarily important, since it kept watch over the unruly Maniots and the Slavic inhabitants of Mount Taygetos, and Nully was named hereditary marshal of Achaea.

Virtually nothing is mentioned about the barony or its fiefs in the sources. To fill the period between its foundation and the 1260s, the historian Karl Hopf hypothesized that there were two barons of Passavant, both named John, but this conjecture was rejected by Antoine Bon. John of Nully married a sister of Walter of Rosières, the Baron of Akova, and had a single daughter: Margaret of Passavant, the common heiress to both Passavant and Akova. However, Margaret never entered her inheritance, since she resided in Constantinople as a hostage in the Byzantine court from 1262 until c. 1275. In the meantime, Passavant had fallen to the Byzantines during their first offensives in the Peloponnese, c. 1263, and the Barony of Akova was confiscated by the Prince because Margaret delayed too long in claiming her inheritance. In the end, after a legal struggle, she received back a third of the barony of Akova.

== Sources ==
- Bon, Antoine (1969). La Morée franque. Recherches historiques, topographiques et archéologiques sur la principauté d'Achaïe [The Frankish Morea. Historical, Topographic and Archaeological Studies on the Principality of Achaea] (in French). Paris: De Boccard. OCLC 869621129.
- Miller, William (1921). Essays on the Latin Orient. Cambridge: Cambridge University Press. OCLC 457893641.
