= Arainus =

Arainus or Arainos (Ancient Greek: Ἀράϊνος) was a small place in ancient Laconia, located on the western side of the Laconian Gulf. It was notable for containing the tomb and monument of Las (Λᾶς), the legendary founder of the nearby town of Las.

The geographer Pausanias , in his Description of Greece, mentioned Arainus together the legend on how Las the founder killed by either Achilles or Patroclus.

Modern scholars identify the site of ancient Arainus with the present day location known as Agheranos or Ageranos (Αγερανός).
