= Las (mythology) =

Legendary figure it Greek mythology

Las (Ancient Greek: Λᾶς) was regarded by the inhabitants of the town of Las in Laconia as the founder of their city. His tomb, surmounted by a statue, was located at a place called Arainus near the town of Las.

According to local tradition, Las was killed by Achilles, who had come to their land to seek the hand of Helen, daughter of Tyndareus. However, the geographer Pausanias disagrees, stating that it was actually Patroclus who killed Las, arguing that Patroclus, not Achilles, was one of Helen’s suitors.
