= Jacques Chancel =

French journalist and writer (1928–2014)

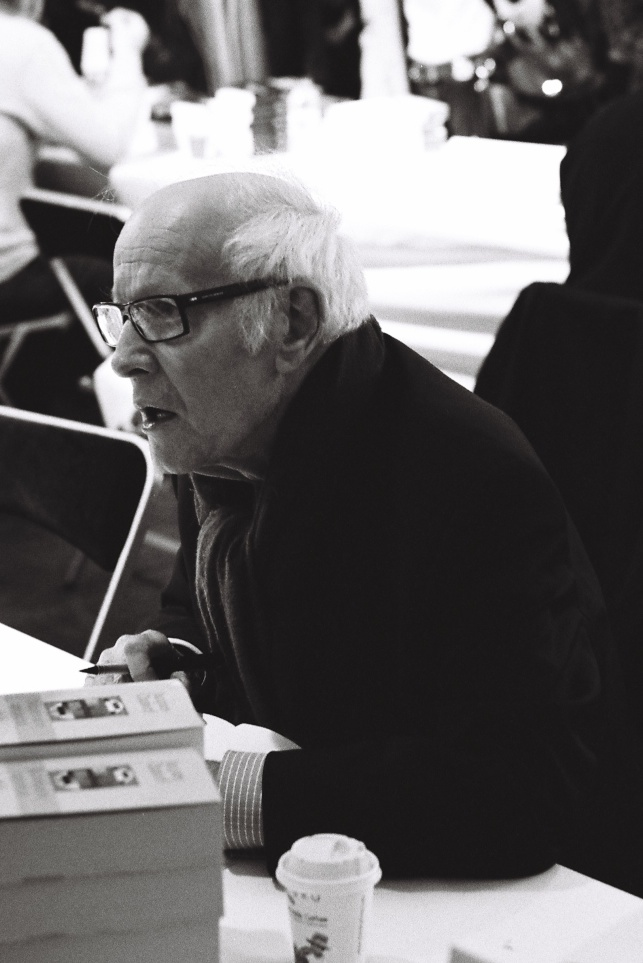
- Born: Joseph Crampes; 2 July 1928; Ayzac-Ost, France
- Died: 23 December 2014 (aged 86); Paris, France
- Occupation: TV presenter

Jacques Chancel, (Joseph André Jacques Régis Crampes; 2 July 1928 – 23 December 2014) was a French journalist and writer. He was known for being the radio host of Radioscopie and Le Grand Échiquier for 22 years. Chancel was born in Ayzac-Ost, France.

Chancel died at his home in Paris from cancer, aged 86.

== Biography ==
As a child, he dreamed of going to Mainland Southeast Asia, where an adventurous uncle trained elephants and ran a rubber plantation.

He claims to have been born in 1931; his teacher had altered his records to make him appear three years older so he could enroll in the Montargis School of Communications and be deployed to Indochina.Assigned as a radio correspondent in Saigon, Joseph Crampes changed his name to Jacques Chancel at the request of the security services.
