= Margaret of Passavant =

Margaret of Nully (French: Marguerite de Nully) also known as Margaret of Passavant, was the hereditary Lady of Passavant, Akova and Mitopoli in the Principality of Achaea, in Frankish Greece, from 1276.

== Life ==
Margaret, born some time before 1240, was a daughter of John of Nully, Baron of Passavant and Marshal of Achaea, and of a sister of Walter of Rosières, the Baron of Akova. Since Walter of Rosières was childless, she was the joint heiress of both baronies. Her first marriage was to Guibert of Cors, who was killed at the Battle of Karydi in 1258.

In 1261 she was sent as a hostage to the Byzantine court of Constantinople, in exchange for the release of Prince William II of Villehardouin and the majority of his nobles, who had been captured at the Battle of Pelagonia in 1259. Margaret remained in the Byzantine court until ca. 1275, during which time Passavant was lost to the Byzantines, and her uncle Walter died (ca. 1273).

On her return to the Principality, she tried to claim her uncle's inheritance but was denied, since by Achaean feudal law, any heir had to bring his claim within at least two years and two days from the death of the last holder, or the claim was forfeit. As Margaret had delayed her arrival, Prince William had already confiscated the Barony of Akova. Margaret's claims became the subject of a celebrated legal dispute, which was abjudicated in a parliament held at Glarentsa, probably in 1276. Following the counsel of her supporters, she married John of Saint Omer, the younger brother of the very influential lord of Thebes, Nicholas II of Saint Omer, to promote her claims. In the event, the parliament found in favour of the Prince, but William nevertheless ceded a third of the barony (eight knight's fiefs) to Margaret and John, while the remainder, along with the fortress of Akova itself, became a fief of William's youngest daughter, Margaret.

== Sources ==
- Bon, Antoine (1969). La Morée franque. Recherches historiques, topographiques et archéologiques sur la principauté d'Achaïe (in French). Paris: De Boccard.
