= Nully-Trémilly =

Coordinates: 48°21′58″N 4°48′22″E

Nully-Trémilly is a former commune in the Haute-Marne département of north-eastern France. It was created on 1 December 1972 from the merger of the communes of Nully and Trémilly. On 1 January 2005, the commune was disestablished when it was split into the two original communes.

== See also ==
- Communes of the Haute-Marne department
