= John of Nully =

French knight

John of Nully (French: Jean de Neuilly or Nully) was a knight of Medieval France who became the first Baron of Passavant in the Principality of Achaea, a crusader state in Southern Greece. The date of his death is unknown.

== Life ==
John of Nully is believed to have been the son of Vilain of Nully, a native of Nully in northeastern France and close friend of the historian Geoffrey of Villehardouin. John made his crusade vow in 1218 and arrived in the Peloponnese in 1220. There he established the fortress of Passavant or Passava (the name is a corruption of "passe avant", a toponym in northeastern France and likely a war-cry or the Nully family motto) on the Taygetus mountains between the Mani Peninsula and the plain of Laconia. The castle, sited to keep watch over the unruly Maniots and the Slavic tribe on Mount Taygetos, became the seat of the Barony of Passavant with four knight's fiefs. Nully was named hereditary marshal of Achaea.

John of Nully married a sister of Walter of Rosières, the Baron of Akova, and had a single daughter: Margaret of Passavant, the common heiress to both Passavant and Akova. Margaret had been sent to Constantinople as a hostage, and when she returned to Greece in ca. 1275, the Peloppenese was restored to Byzantine control. Passavant had fallen and Akova had was confiscated. After a long legal process Margaret was able to reclaim one-third of Akova. The historian Karl Hopf hypothesized that John was succeeded by another baron of the same name, John II, but this conjecture was rejected by Antoine Bon.

== Sources ==
- Bon, Antoine (1969). La Morée franque. Recherches historiques, topographiques et archéologiques sur la principauté d'Achaïe [The Frankish Morea. Historical, Topographic and Archaeological Studies on the Principality of Achaea] (in French). Paris: De Boccard.
- Miller, William (1921). Essays on the Latin Orient. Cambridge: Cambridge University Press.
