= Uz, Hautes-Pyrénées =

Uz
- Commune
- Coat of arms
- Location of Uz
- Location within France Location within Occitanie
- Coordinates: 42°58′03″N 0°05′07″W
- Country: France
- Region: Occitania
- Department: Hautes-Pyrénées
- Arrondissement: Argelès-Gazost
- Canton: La Vallée des Gaves
- Intercommunality: Pyrénées Vallées des Gaves

Government
  - Mayor (2021–2026): Félix Sasso
- Area^{1}: 2.45 km^{2} (0.95 sq mi)
- Elevation: 750 m (2,460 ft)
- Highest elevation: 1,207 m (3,960 ft)
- Lowest elevation: 625 m (2,051 ft)
- Population (2023): 37
  - Density: 15/km^{2} (39/sq mi)
- Time zone: UTC+01:00 (CET)
  - Summer (DST): UTC+02:00 (CEST)
- INSEE/Postal code: 65458 /65400
- ^{1} French Land Register data, which excludes lakes, ponds, glaciers > 1 km^{2} (0.386 sq mi or 247 acres) and river estuaries.

Uz is a commune in the Hautes-Pyrénées department in south-western France.

== See also ==
- Communes of the Hautes-Pyrénées department
