= Saint-Savin, Hautes-Pyrénées =

Saint-Savin
- Commune
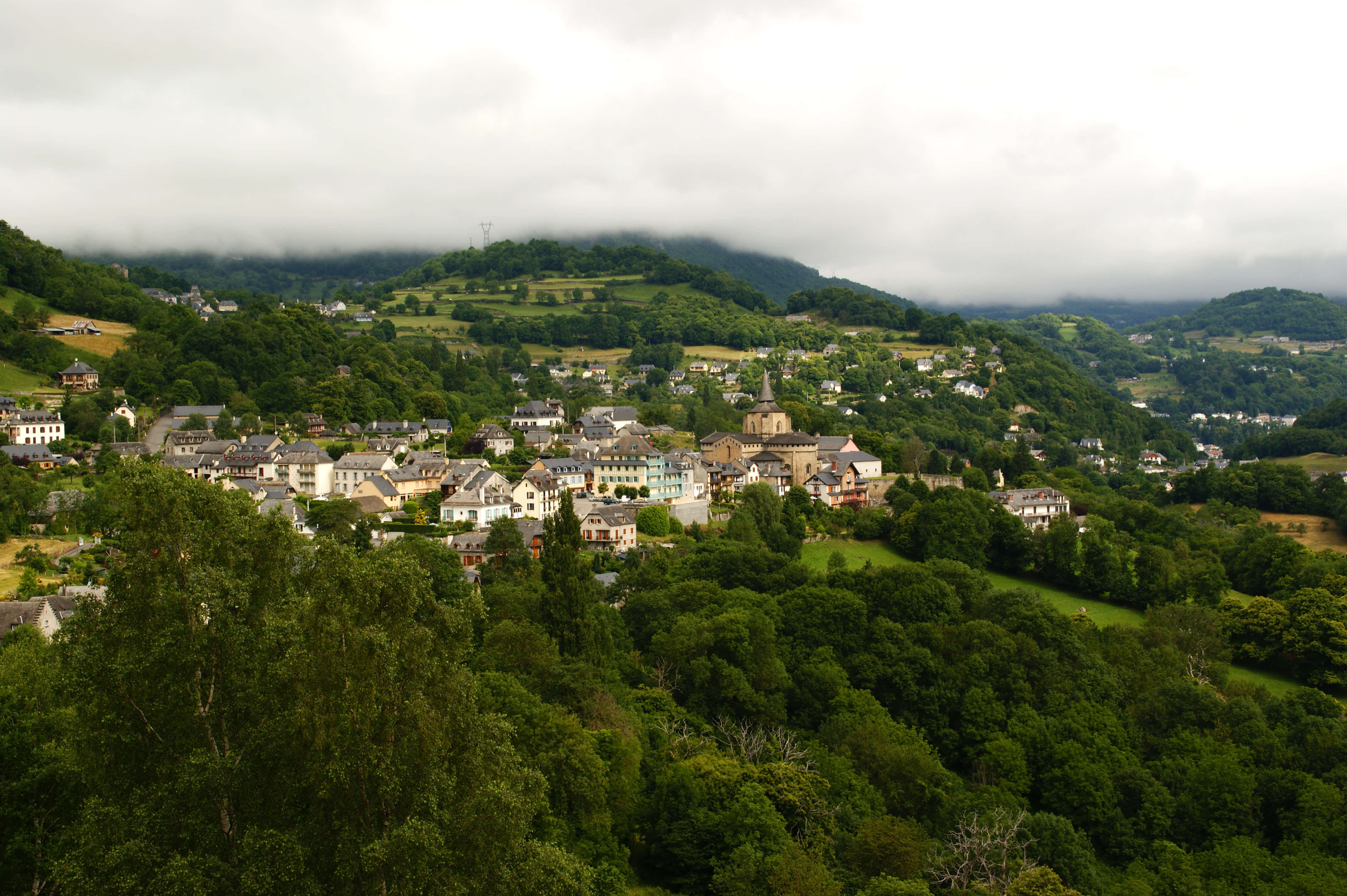
- A view of Saint-Savin

- Coat of arms
- Location of Saint-Savin
- Location within France Location within Occitanie
- Coordinates: 42°58′50″N 0°05′22″W
- Country: France
- Region: Occitania
- Department: Hautes-Pyrénées
- Arrondissement: Argelès-Gazost
- Canton: La Vallée des Gaves
- Intercommunality: Pyrénées Vallées des Gaves

Government
  - Mayor (2020–2026): Jean-Bertrand Haurine
- Area^{1}: 3.86 km^{2} (1.49 sq mi)
- Highest elevation: 1,320 m (4,330 ft)
- Lowest elevation: 433 m (1,421 ft)
- Population (2023): 364
  - Density: 94.3/km^{2} (244/sq mi)
- Time zone: UTC+01:00 (CET)
  - Summer (DST): UTC+02:00 (CEST)
- INSEE/Postal code: 65396 /65400
- ^{1} French Land Register data, which excludes lakes, ponds, glaciers > 1 km^{2} (0.386 sq mi or 247 acres) and river estuaries.

Saint-Savin (French pronunciation: [sɛ̃ savɛ̃]; Gascon: Sent Savin) is a commune in the Hautes-Pyrénées department, and the Occitanie region, in south-western France. The community was founded in the fourth century as a Benedictine abbey under the protection of St. Martin.

The inhabitants (gentilés) of Saint-Savin are called “Saint-Savinois”.

One of the best places to view Saint-Savin is from the sixteenth-century chapel, Notre Dame de Piétat.

== Legends ==
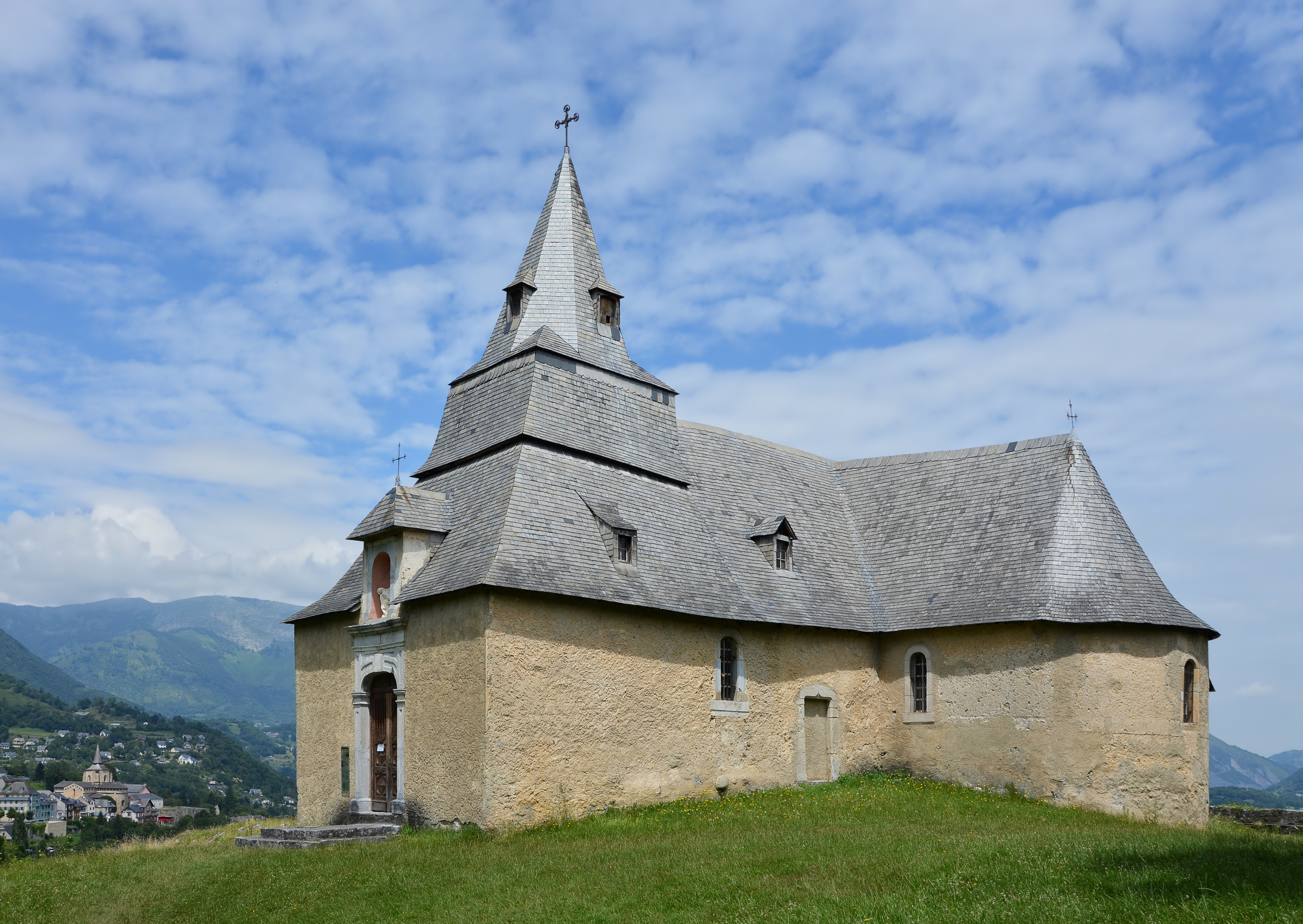
View of the Chapel of Notre Dame de Piétat, close to Saint-Savin

One legend concerns the name Pyrenees. In the ancient past, Hercules visited the area, and fell in love with a beautiful girl named Pyrene, who happened to be a daughter of the King of Cerdagne. The king refused to allow Pyrene to marry Hercules, and so the desperate girl ran away. Hercules searched for her, but found her too late: she had been killed by wild cats. Hercules buried the body, and covered her grave with stones, which subsequently became the mountains.

Roland, a warrior who was part of the court of Charlemagne, also has an important legendary connection to the area. In exchange for room and board at the Saint-Savin convent, Roland is said to have fought and killed two giants, Passamont and Alabaster, who, much to the monks' dismay, were living close to their priory.

== The Abbey of Saint-Savin ==
The known history of the Abbey of Saint-Savin-en-Lavedan dates back to 945. The counts and viscounts of Bigorre financed and helped arrange a major part of the construction and decoration of the monastery, and the abbey enjoyed prosperity for quite some time. In the thirteenth century, it controlled the territory of seven municipalities.

Then, after several religious wars, the abbey was virtually abandoned. Only three monks lived there in 1790. In 1854 a violent earthquake ruined the abbey even more, but also caused something of a new beginning.

=== Savin, the pious hermit monk ===
Savin was born in Spain into a wealthy family: his father was a count in Barcelona. At some point Savin moved to France, and became a monk. He was sent to Saint-Savin, but decided to live a simple and isolated life in the mountains above the village. During the 13 years he spent there he performed several miracles: he was able to find water where there was none, he created milk in order to feed a hungry child, and so on. When he died, his body was carried to Saint-Savin. Now his marble tomb serves as the altar in the Saint-Savin church.

=== Cagots ===
As was the case in a few other villages and towns in Hautes-Pyrénées, the town of Saint-Savin included a small community of Cagots, a minority group that was despised for obscure reasons. They were treated as if they were lepers and dangerously infectious, though investigations even by 17th century doctors found no evidence of this.

There are quite a few examples of Romanesque art in the church, one of which is a granite carving of two Cagots. The church also contains an interesting example of a special separate Holy water font for them to dip their right hand into. Use of the normal font was forbidden to Cagots. Cagots were allowed to attend the Mass, but only through a low window at the bottom of the nave. People were afraid to get close to them, and so they were given communion using a long stick that is still to be seen in the church.

== See also ==
- Communes of the Hautes-Pyrénées department
