= Nully =

- Commune
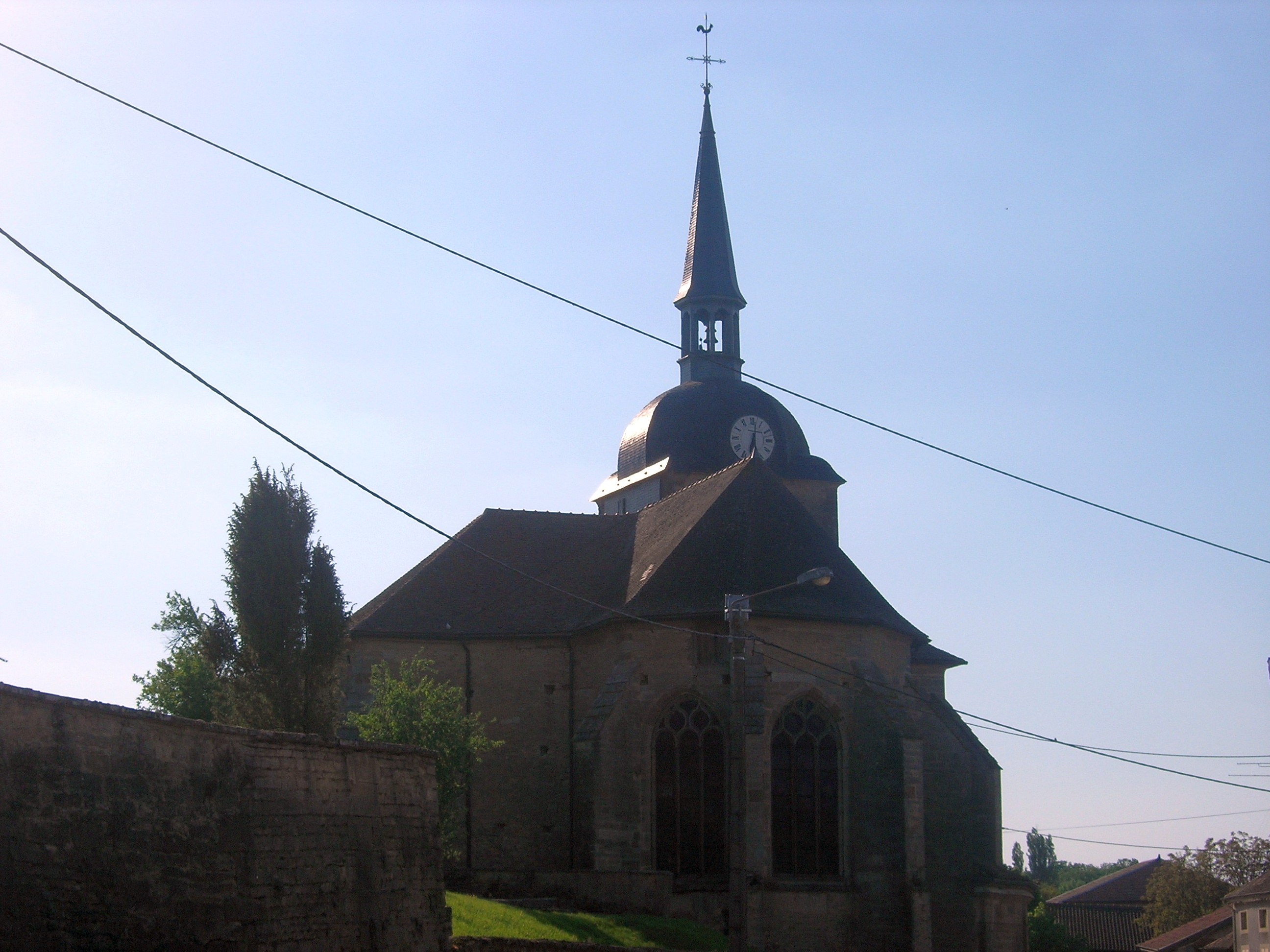
- The church in Nully
- Location of Nully
- Location within France Location within Grand Est
- Coordinates: 48°21′56″N 4°48′25″E
- Country: France
- Region: Grand Est
- Department: Haute-Marne
- Arrondissement: Saint-Dizier
- Canton: Joinville
- Area^{1}: 17.84 km^{2} (6.89 sq mi)
- Highest elevation: 206 m (676 ft)
- Lowest elevation: 154 m (505 ft)
- Population (2023): 141
  - Density: 7.90/km^{2} (20.5/sq mi)
- Time zone: UTC+01:00 (CET)
  - Summer (DST): UTC+02:00 (CEST)
- INSEE/Postal code: 52359 /52110
- ^{1} French Land Register data, which excludes lakes, ponds, glaciers > 1 km^{2} (0.386 sq mi or 247 acres) and river estuaries.

Nully (French pronunciation: [nyli]) is a commune in the Haute-Marne department in north-eastern France.

The two villages of Nully and Trémilly were merged into a single commune from 1 December 1972 to 1 January 2005; they are now two separate communes.

== See also ==
- Nully-Trémilly
- Communes of the Haute-Marne department
