= Lau-Balagnas =

- Commune
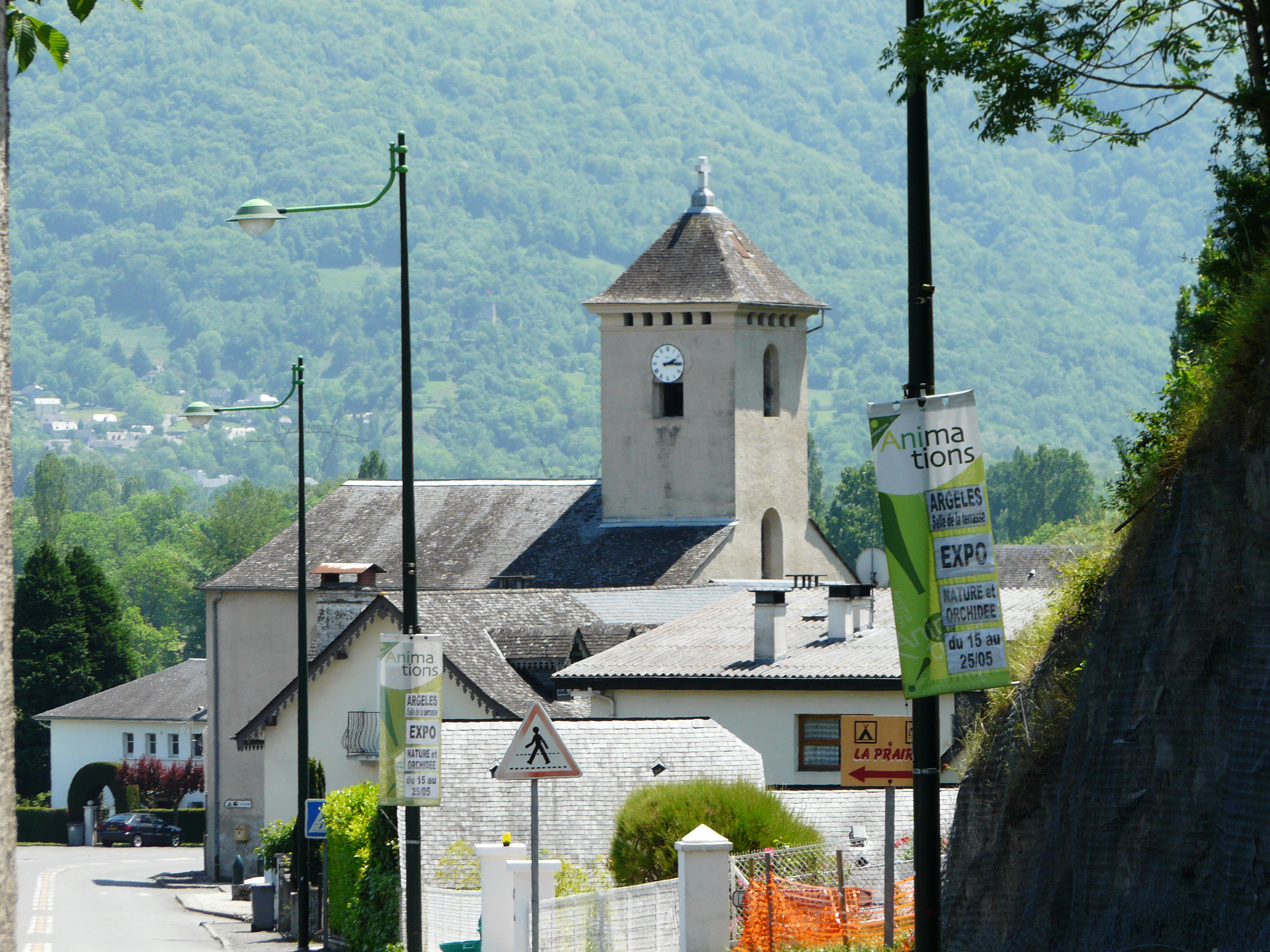
- The church of Saint-Laurent

- Coat of arms
- Location of Lau-Balagnas
- Location within France Location within Occitanie
- Coordinates: 42°59′48″N 0°05′27″W
- Country: France
- Region: Occitania
- Department: Hautes-Pyrénées
- Arrondissement: Argelès-Gazost
- Canton: La Vallée des Gaves
- Intercommunality: Pyrénées Vallées des Gaves

Government
  - Mayor (2020–2026): Henri Bareilles
- Area^{1}: 2.9 km^{2} (1.1 sq mi)
- Elevation: 476 m (1,562 ft)
- Highest elevation: 573 m (1,880 ft)
- Lowest elevation: 419 m (1,375 ft)
- Population (2023): 501
  - Density: 170/km^{2} (450/sq mi)
- Time zone: UTC+01:00 (CET)
  - Summer (DST): UTC+02:00 (CEST)
- INSEE/Postal code: 65267 /65400
- ^{1} French Land Register data, which excludes lakes, ponds, glaciers > 1 km^{2} (0.386 sq mi or 247 acres) and river estuaries.

Lau-Balagnas (French pronunciation: [lo balaɲas]; Occitan: Laurs e Balanhans) is a commune in the Hautes-Pyrénées department in south-western France.

== See also ==
- Communes of the Hautes-Pyrénées department
