= Ayzac-Ost =

- Commune
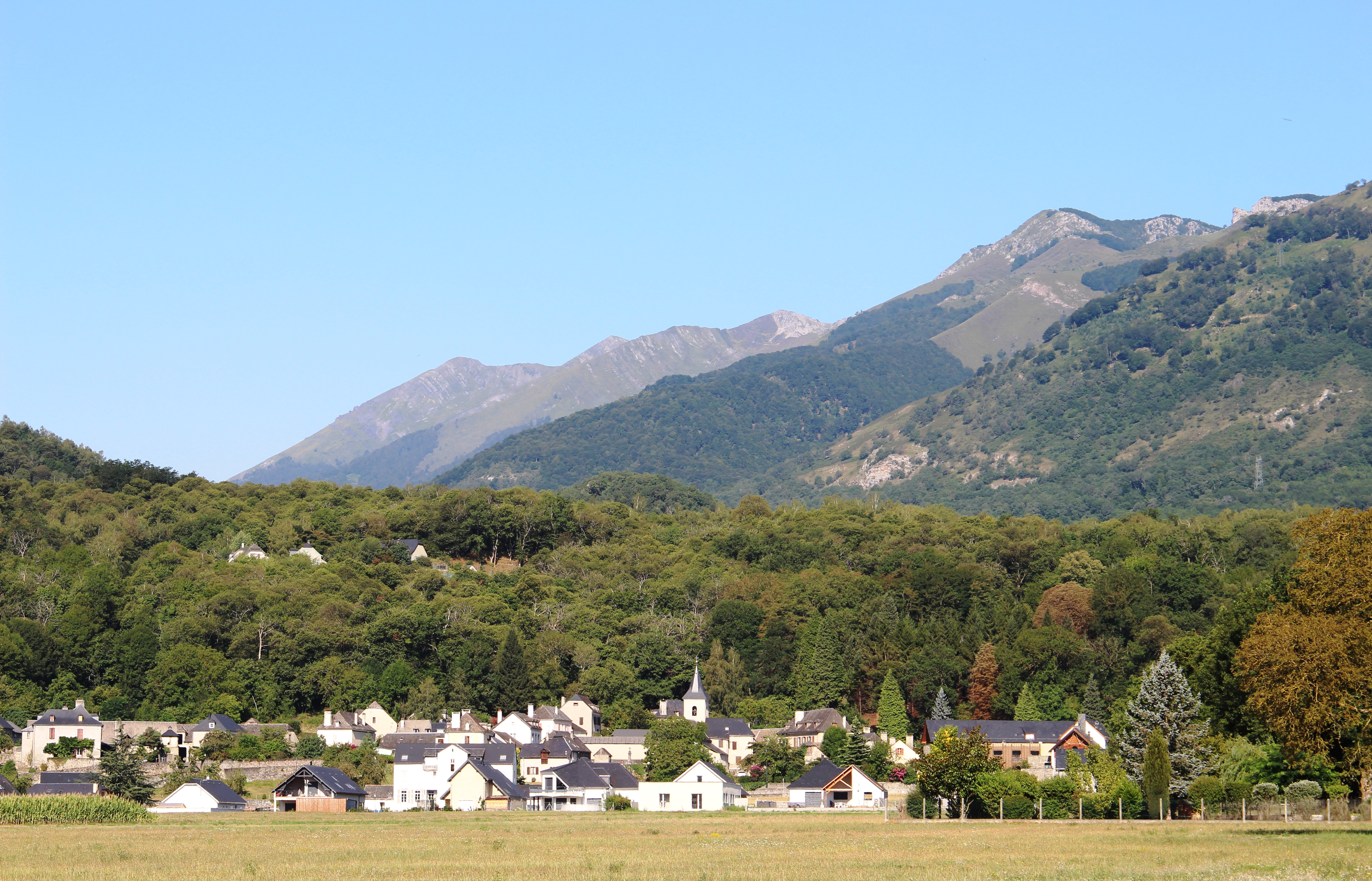

- Coat of arms
- Location of Ayzac-Ost
- Location within France Location within Occitanie
- Coordinates: 43°01′29″N 0°05′43″W
- Country: France
- Region: Occitania
- Department: Hautes-Pyrénées
- Arrondissement: Argelès-Gazost
- Canton: La Vallée des Gaves
- Intercommunality: CC Pyrénées Vallées des Gaves

Government
  - Mayor (2020–2026): Serge Cabar
- Area^{1}: 3.08 km^{2} (1.19 sq mi)
- Elevation: 416 m (1,365 ft)
- Highest elevation: 850 m (2,790 ft)
- Lowest elevation: 408 m (1,339 ft)
- Population (2023): 473
  - Density: 154/km^{2} (398/sq mi)
- Time zone: UTC+01:00 (CET)
  - Summer (DST): UTC+02:00 (CEST)
- INSEE/Postal code: 65056 /65400
- ^{1} French Land Register data, which excludes lakes, ponds, glaciers > 1 km^{2} (0.386 sq mi or 247 acres) and river estuaries.

Ayzac-Ost (French pronunciation: [aizak ɔst]; Occitan: Aisac e Òst) is a commune in the Hautes-Pyrénées department of southwestern France.

== Population ==
Historical population
Year	Pop.	±% p.a.
1968	367	—
1975	381	+0.54%
1982	375	−0.23%
1990	369	−0.20%
1999	388	+0.56%
2007	400	+0.38%
2012	430	+1.46%
2017	450	+0.91%
2023	473	+0.83%
Source: INSEE

== See also ==
- Communes of the Hautes-Pyrénées department
