= Las (Greece) =

Ancient Greek town in Laconia

Coordinates: 36°43′40″N 22°30′17″E

Las (Ancient Greek: Λᾶς and ἡ Λᾶς), or Laas (Λάας), or La (Λᾶ), was an Ancient Greek town in Laconia on the Peloponnese, on the east coast of the Mani Peninsula on the Laconian Gulf. The c. 330 BCE Periplus of Pseudo-Scylax names Las as the only coastal town between Tainaron (Cape Matapan) and Gytheio.

The Periplus describes a port at Las, but according to the 2nd-century CE geographer Pausanias, the town itself was 10 stadia from the sea, and 40 stadia from Gytheio. In the time of Pausanias the town lay in a hollow between three mountains called "Asia", "Ilium", and "Cnacadium"; the old town stood on the summit of Mt. Asia. The name "Las" signified a rock at the original location. Las is named in the Catalogue of Ships in the Iliad. According to local tradition the founder of the town was Las.

In Greek mythology, Las was destroyed by the twins Castor and Pollux, who then called themselves "Lapersae". The name "Lapersa" was in turn given to a mountain in Laconia.

== History ==
The Peloponnese (Morea) in late medieval times, with major towns and fortresses

In ancient times Las was a Spartan possession. Las broke with Sparta in 195 BC and became part of the Union of Free Laconians; the Spartans recaptured the city in 189 BC. The Spartan citadel was then taken over by the Achaean League and Las gained its independence again. When the Romans took over most of Greece in 146 BC, Las and the other Free Laconian cities continued to be recognized as free cities. In Roman times, Las had a thermae (baths) and a gymnasium.

Las's importance diminished under Roman rule. Livy speaks of it as "vicus maritimus", and Pausanias mentions the ruins of the city on Mt. Asia. Before the walls he saw a statue of Heracles, and a trophy erected over the Macedonians who were a part of Philip V of Macedon's army when he invaded Laconia; and among the ruins he noticed a statue of Athena Asia. The modern town was near a fountain called Galaco (Γαλακώ), from the milky colour of its water, and near it was a gymnasium, in which stood an ancient statue of Hermes. On Mt. Ilium stood a temple of Dionysus, and on the summit a temple of Asclepius; and on Mt. Cnacadium a temple of Apollo Carneius. Las is spoken of by Polybius and Strabo under the name of "Asine"; it is possible that colonists from Asine in Argolis settled at Las and gave their name to the town.

The site is not mentioned in Byzantine times until after the "Frankish" conquest of the Peloponnese (see Frankokratia), when Mani, as part of the Principality of Achaea, was given to the French nobleman John of Nully, who built a castle at Las sometime after 1218. This castle became known as Passavant or Passavas in Greek, a name probably related to the motto or war-cry Passe-Avant, "move forward", or to one of the similar toponyms in northeastern France. Nully's Barony of Passavant comprised four knight's fiefs, but virtually nothing is known about it. It was apparently short-lived, with the castle itself falling to the Byzantines during their first offensives in the Peloponnese in ca. 1263.

The castle was in use once again during the second Byzantine period, under the Despotate of the Morea. The castle of Passavas was occupied by the Ottomans for a short time when they took over the majority of the Peloponnese, in a failed attempt to keep control over the Maniots who refused to accept Ottoman rule. In 1601, a Spanish fleet led by Alonso de Contreras that was raiding in the area surprised the Ottoman garrison and sacked the city. It was regarrisoned in 1669 by the Ottoman general Kuesy Ali Pasha. The castle was captured again in 1684 by the Venetians and the Maniots. The Venetians carried off the cannons and destroyed the city so it would not be used again. When the leader of the Maniots was executed by the Ottomans, his mother led the men of Skoutari who dressed up as priests on Easter Sunday and were allowed entry to the castle. When they got in they took out their hidden weapons and not many of the 700 families inhabiting the castle escaped. The castle was abandoned after that and has not been inhabited since.

== Passavas ==
Las stood upon the hill of Passavas (Greek: Πασσαβάς), which is now crowned by the ruins of a fortress of the middle ages, among which, however, William Martin Leake, who visited the site in the 19th century, noticed, at the southern end of the eastern wall, a piece of Hellenic wall, about 50 paces in length, and two-thirds of the height of the modern wall. It is formed of polygonal blocks of stone, some four feet long and three broad. The fountain Galaco is the stream Turkóvrysa, which rises between the hill of Passavas and the village of Kárvela, the latter being one mile and a half (2.5 km) west of Passavas.

== Castle ==
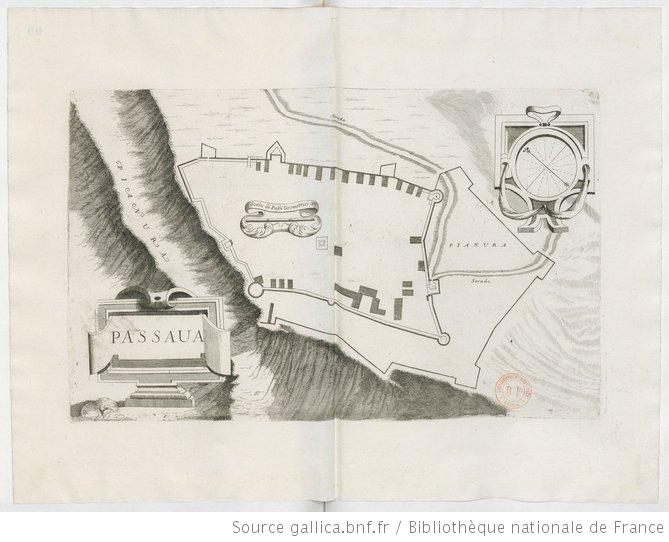
Sketch of the castle by the Venetian Vincenzo Coronelli, 1689

The present castle on the site dates after the 13th century, perhaps even after the Middle Ages. It is of a quadrilateral shape, some 180 m long and 90 m wide. The castle originally featured large round towers on the northwestern, southeastern, and southwestern corners, but only the northwestern one survives. A square tower was located on the northeastern corner, the highest point of the castle; two other square towers were located in the middle of the northern and eastern walls. The wall surrounding the castle was not very tall—the chemin de ronde is barely 2 m higher than the castle's interior—and its north-eastern side is particularly feeble, as it was protected by its location on the top of the rocky hill. The entrance was probably in the south. Unidentified structures were built adjoining the walls on the interior, while during the later Ottoman occupation a mosque was built in the centre.

== Sources ==
- Bon, Antoine (1969). La Morée franque. Recherches historiques, topographiques et archéologiques sur la principauté d'Achaïe (in French). Paris: De Boccard.
- Livy. "Rome and the Mediterranean" ISBN 0-14-044318-5
- Peter Green. Alexander to Actium: Historical Evolution of the Hellenistic Age ISBN 0-500-01485-X
