= Walter of Rosières =

Walter of Rosières (French: Gauthier de Rosières) was a French knight who participated in the Fourth Crusade and became the first lord of the Barony of Akova in the Frankish Principality of Achaea. The Chronicle of Morea credits Walter with the construction of the fortress of Akova or Mattegrifon. He died childless, ca. 1273.

== Sources ==
- Bon, Antoine (1969). La Morée franque. Recherches historiques, topographiques et archéologiques sur la principauté d'Achaïe [The Frankish Morea. Historical, Topographic and Archaeological Studies on the Principality of Achaea] (in French). Paris: De Boccard. OCLC 869621129.
