= Campan =

- Commune
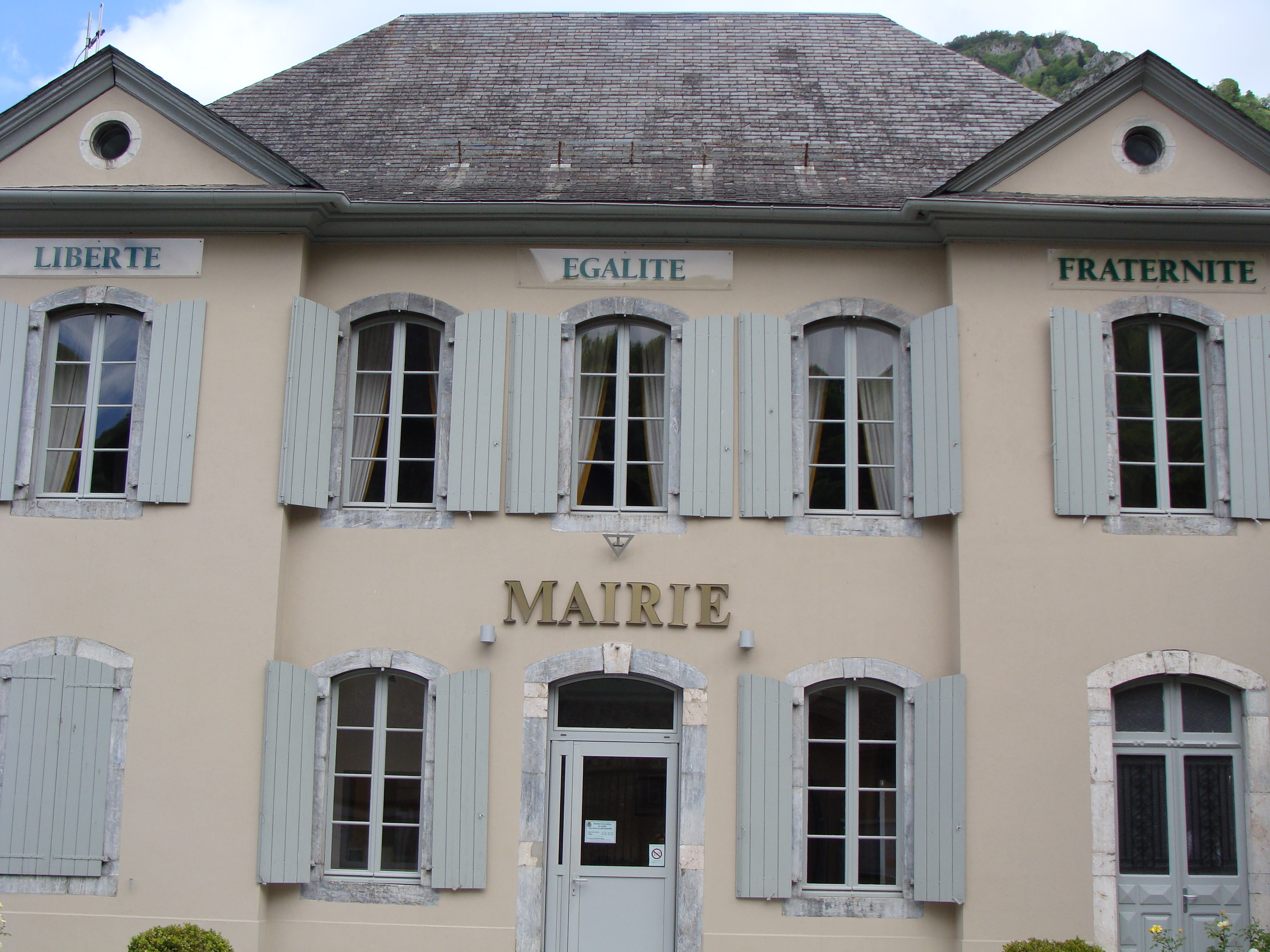
- The town hall of Campan

- Coat of arms
- Location of Campan
- Location within France Location within Occitanie
- Coordinates: 43°01′03″N 0°10′42″E
- Country: France
- Region: Occitania
- Department: Hautes-Pyrénées
- Arrondissement: Bagnères-de-Bigorre
- Canton: La Haute-Bigorre

Government
  - Mayor (2020–2026): Alexandre Pujo-Menjouet
- Area^{1}: 95.36 km^{2} (36.82 sq mi)
- Elevation: 656 m (2,152 ft)
- Highest elevation: 2,747 m (9,012 ft)
- Lowest elevation: 629 m (2,064 ft)
- Population (2023): 1,245
  - Density: 13.06/km^{2} (33.81/sq mi)
- Time zone: UTC+01:00 (CET)
  - Summer (DST): UTC+02:00 (CEST)
- INSEE/Postal code: 65123 /65710
- ^{1} French Land Register data, which excludes lakes, ponds, glaciers > 1 km^{2} (0.386 sq mi or 247 acres) and river estuaries.

Campan (French pronunciation: [kɑ̃pɑ̃]; Occitan: Campan) is a French commune located in the center of the Hautes-Pyrénées department, in the Occitanie region. Historically and culturally, the commune is in the province of Haut-Adour, formerly included in the old county of Bigorre. It is in the Bagnères-de-Bigorre urban area and is part of the Bagnères-de-Bigorre catchment area.

This mountainous area consists of the western extensions of the Néouvielle and Arbizon massifs. Experiencing a mountain climate, it is drained by the Adour, Adour de Gripp, Adour de Lesponne, Gaoube, Gaoubole, Garet, the Arizes stream, and various other small rivers. Included in the Pyrénées National Park, the commune boasts a remarkable natural heritage: a Natura 2000 site ("Liset de Hount Blanque"), a protected area ("Adour and tributaries"), and sixteen natural areas of ecological, faunal, and floristic interest.

== Geography ==
=== Location ===
Campan is located in the Pyrenees mountain range, in the upper Adour Valley, at the confluence of the Adour and Adour de Payolle rivers. The Pic du Midi de Bigorre is less than 10 kilometers as the crow flies from the main town.

The city of Lourdes is about 30 kilometers northwest of Campan.

The nearest border with Spain is a 1 hour 30 minute drive away.

=== Introduction ===
Campan includes:

- The town, seat of the Mairie (town hall)
- Galade
- Ste Marie de Campan, famous for its role in the Tour de France cycle race
- La Séoube and its valley, which leads to the col d'Aspin
- Payolle
- Gripp et Artigues at the foot of the col du Tourmalet

The ski resort of La Mongie lies in Campan.

=== Neighboring communes ===
The neighbouring communes are Ancizan, Arreau, Aspin-Aure, Asté, Aulon, Bagnères-de-Bigorre, Beaudéan, Beyrède-Jumet-Camous and Esparros.

=== Geology and relief ===
The Campan Valley is an ancient glacial valley. It is prone to earthquakes and is located in a highly seismic zone. One of the oldest recorded earthquakes dates back to June 21, 1660. The earth is said to have trembled for three weeks.

The commune covers an area of 9,541 hectares; its altitude varies between 629 and 2,747 meters.

The peaks located in the commune of Campan are Teillet (1,287 m), Castet Sarradis (1,781 m), and Soum de Marianette (2,353 m). The peaks of Hount Blanque (1,941 m), Pene Arrouye (2,420 m), and Pic de Montarrouye (2,569 m) are located on the border between the communes of Campan and Bagnères-de-Bigorre.

Marble quarries were mined until the end of the 20th century. The marble, pink with green veins, was used, among other things, to decorate the Palace of Versailles.

=== Hydrography ===
The commune is located in the Adour basin, within the Adour-Garonne hydrographic basin. It is drained by the Adour, forming a hydrographic network of 203 km in total length.

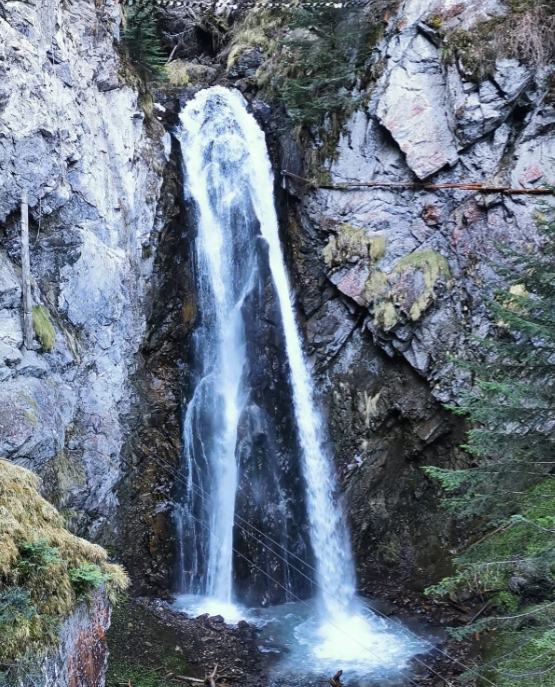
Garet Waterfall in February 2022

The Adour, with a total length of 308.8 km, is formed in the Campan Valley in Haute-Bigorre from the meeting of three torrents: the Adour de Payolle, the Adour de Gripp and the Adour de Lesponne and flows from south to north. It crosses the commune and flows into the Bay of Biscay at Anglet, after crossing 118 communes.

=== Landscapes and relief ===
Selection of views of the hamlets

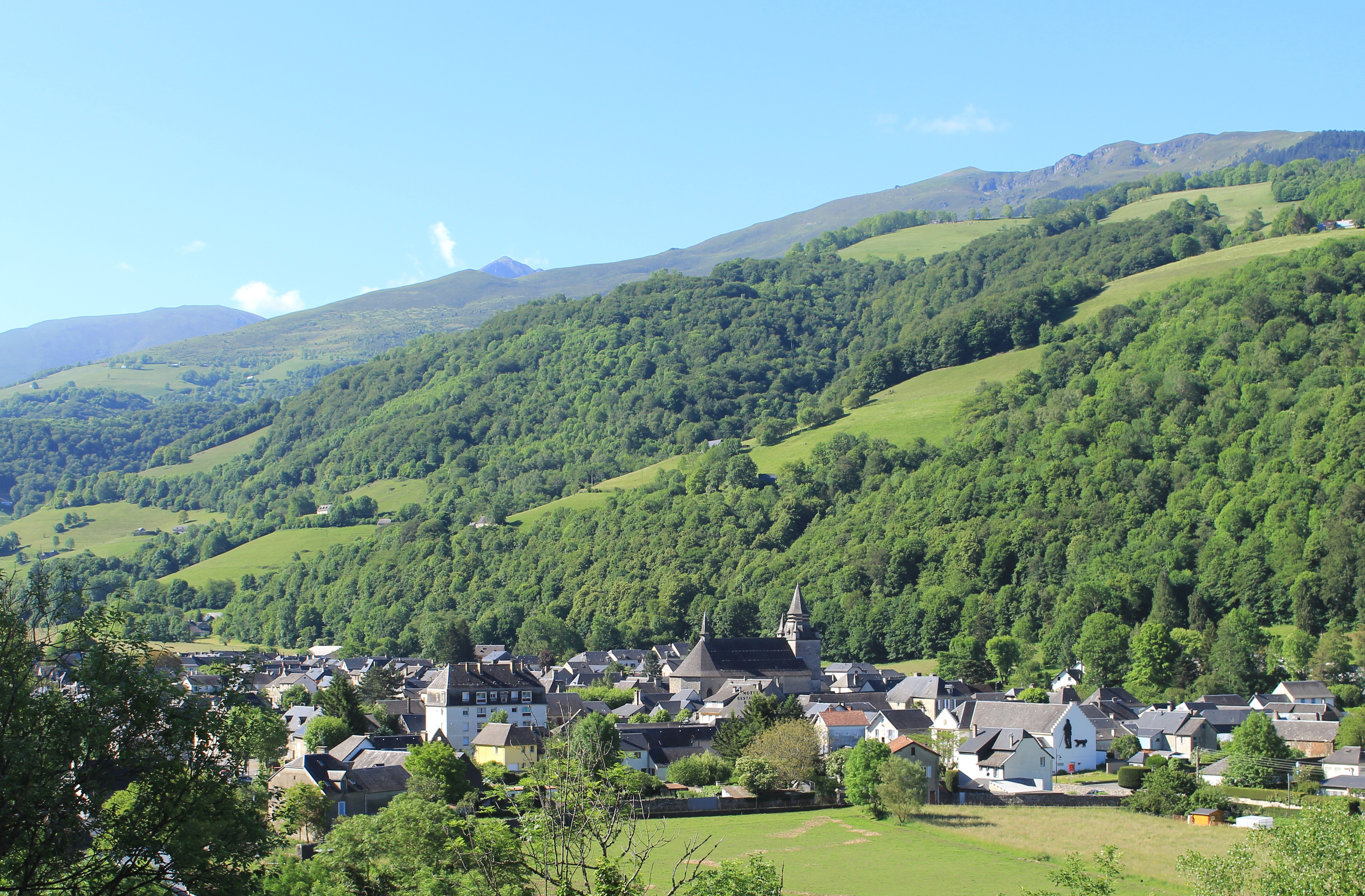
The village of Campan.

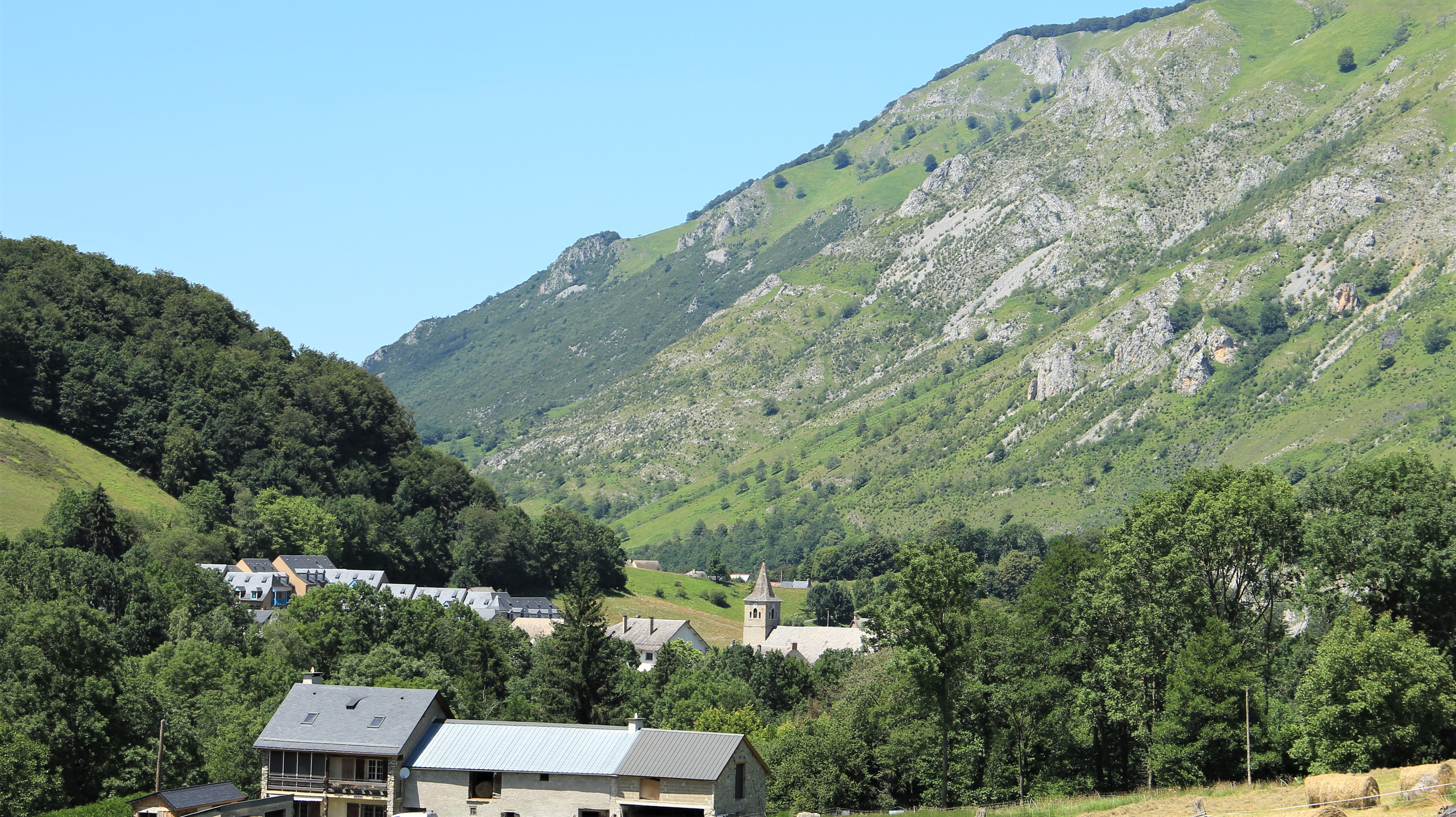
The village of Sainte-Marie de Campan.

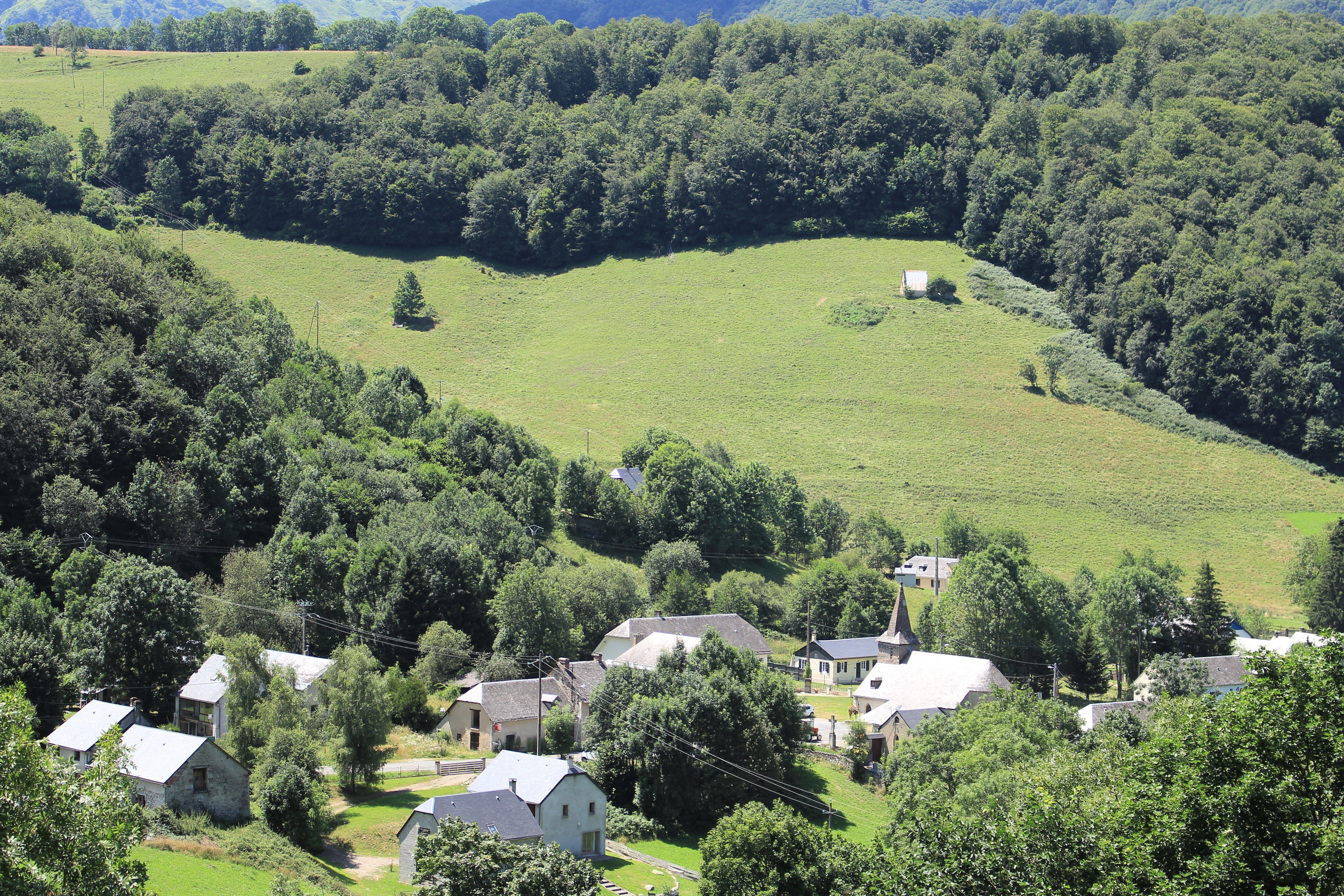
The village of La Séoube.

=== Climate ===
The Météo-France weather station located in the town and in operation from 1959 to 2015 allows us to track the evolution of meteorological indicators. A detailed table for the period 1981-2010 is presented below.

Climate data for Campan
Month	Jan	Feb	Mar	Apr	May	Jun	Jul	Aug	Sep	Oct	Nov	Dec	Year
Mean daily maximum °C (°F)	4.2 (39.6)	5.5 (41.9)	8.1 (46.6)	9.5 (49.1)	12.8 (55.0)	16.2 (61.2)	18.7 (65.7)	18.7 (65.7)	16.1 (61.0)	13.3 (55.9)	7.9 (46.2)	5 (41)	11.4 (52.5)
Daily mean °C (°F)	1.2 (34.2)	1.9 (35.4)	4.1 (39.4)	5.6 (42.1)	9 (48)	12.4 (54.3)	14.6 (58.3)	14.6 (58.3)	12.3 (54.1)	9.6 (49.3)	4.8 (40.6)	2.1 (35.8)	7.7 (45.9)
Mean daily minimum °C (°F)	−1.9 (28.6)	−1.6 (29.1)	0.1 (32.2)	1.8 (35.2)	5.2 (41.4)	8.5 (47.3)	10.4 (50.7)	10.6 (51.1)	8.4 (47.1)	5.8 (42.4)	1.7 (35.1)	−0.9 (30.4)	4 (39)
Average precipitation mm (inches)	118.4 (4.66)	85.4 (3.36)	96.9 (3.81)	112.3 (4.42)	113.4 (4.46)	93.9 (3.70)	73.3 (2.89)	77.7 (3.06)	88.9 (3.50)	104.5 (4.11)	134.7 (5.30)	121.4 (4.78)	1,220.8 (48.05)
Source: donneespubliques.meteofrance.fr

=== Communication routes and transport ===
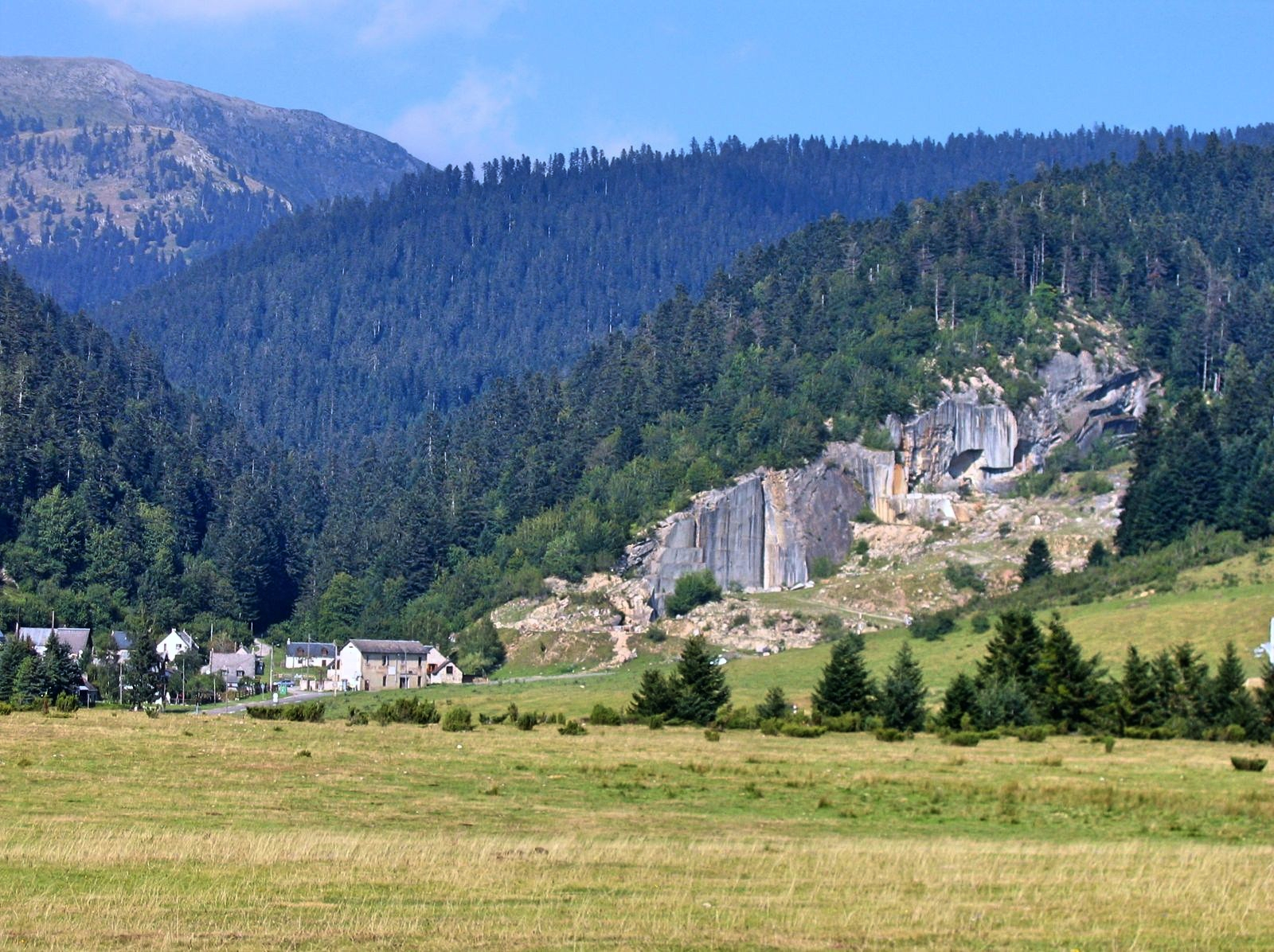
Campan. Royal career of Espiadet

==== Communication routes ====
There is only one road that runs up the valley between the village and Sainte-Marie: the D935 departmental road. The village can be reached from the north via Beaudéan on the same D935 or via Asté on the D8 departmental road. At Sainte-Marie, the D935 joins the D918 departmental road, which connects the Col d'Aspin to the Col du Tourmalet. It is therefore possible to reach the commune of Campan via these two mountain passes.

Numerous streets and roads branch off from these two main roads to serve the various parts of the commune, such as the D154 and the D155.

==== Transportation ====
The Hautes-Pyrénées General Council offers an on-demand bus service on the Sainte-Marie-de-Campan / Bagnères-de-Bigorre route (there is a regular bus service between Tarbes and Bagnères-de-Bigorre).

There is no other public transport service for accessing or moving around within the commune of Campan.

== Urban planning ==
=== Typology ===
As of January 1, 2024, Campan is categorized as a rural commune with dispersed housing, according to the new seven-level municipal density grid defined by INSEE in 2022. It belongs to the urban unit of Bagnères-de-Bigorre, an intra-departmental agglomeration grouping ten communes, of which it is a suburban commune. Furthermore, the commune is part of the Bagnères-de-Bigorre catchment area, of which it is a suburban commune. This area, which groups together 21 communes, is categorized in areas with fewer than 50,000 inhabitants.

=== Land use ===
Campan's land use, as shown in the European Corine Land Cover (CLC) biophysical land use database, is marked by the importance of forests and semi-natural environments (85.7% in 2018), a proportion identical to that of 1990 (85.7%). The detailed breakdown in 2018 is as follows: environments with shrubby and/or herbaceous vegetation (46.9%), forests (31.5%), grasslands (9.7%), open spaces with little or no vegetation (7.3%), mixed agricultural areas (4.3%), and urbanized areas (0.3%).

The IGN also provides an online tool allowing users to compare changes over time in land use in the commune (or territories at different scales). Several periods are accessible in the form of maps or aerial photos: the Cassini map (18th century), the staff map (1820-1866) and the current period (1950 to today).

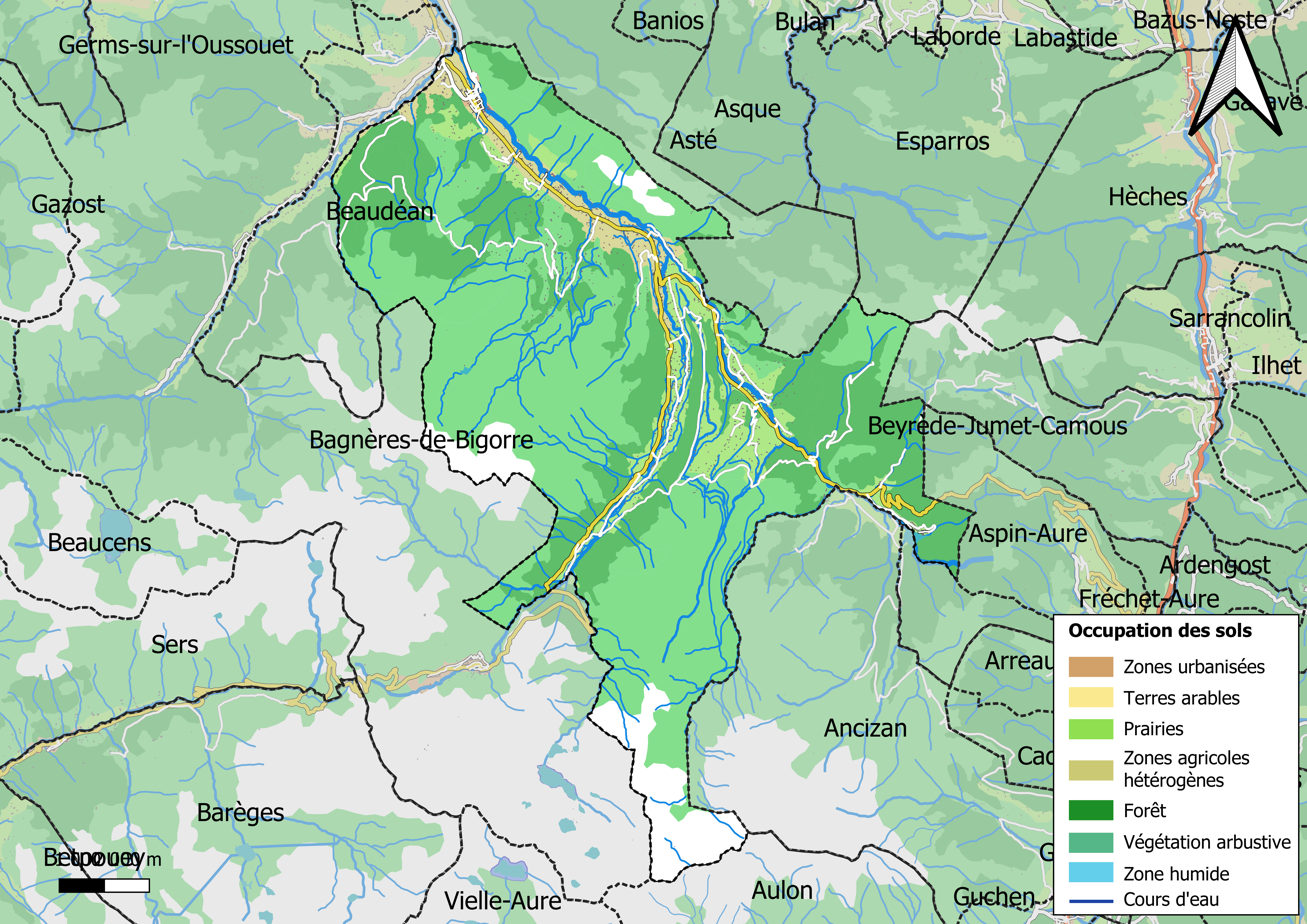
Map of infrastructure and land use in 2018 (CLC) of Campan.

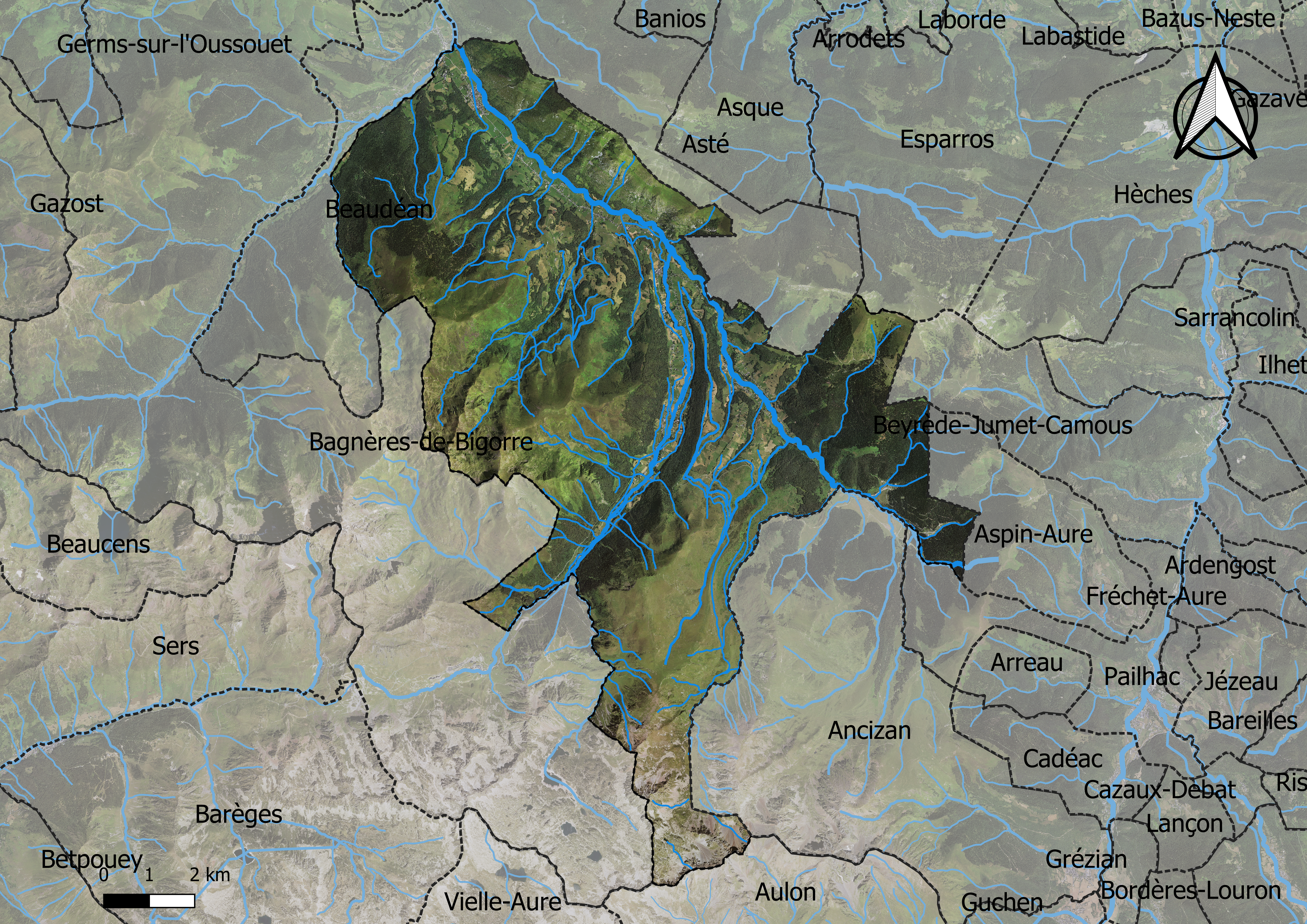
Orthophotogrammetric map of the commune.

=== Urban morphology ===
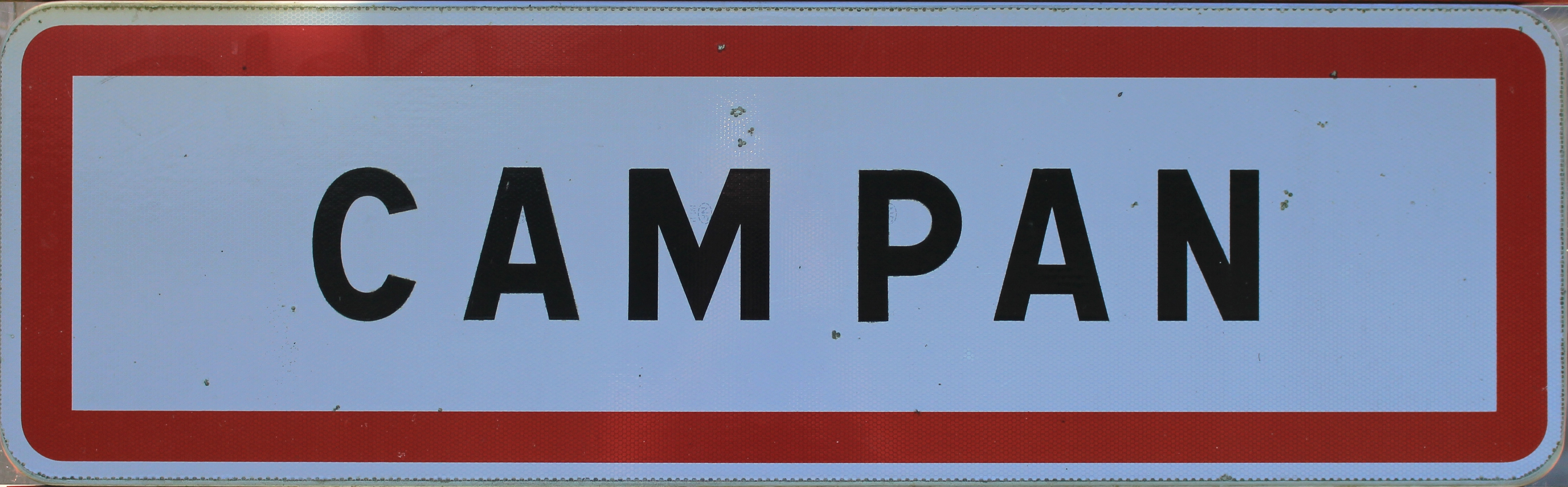

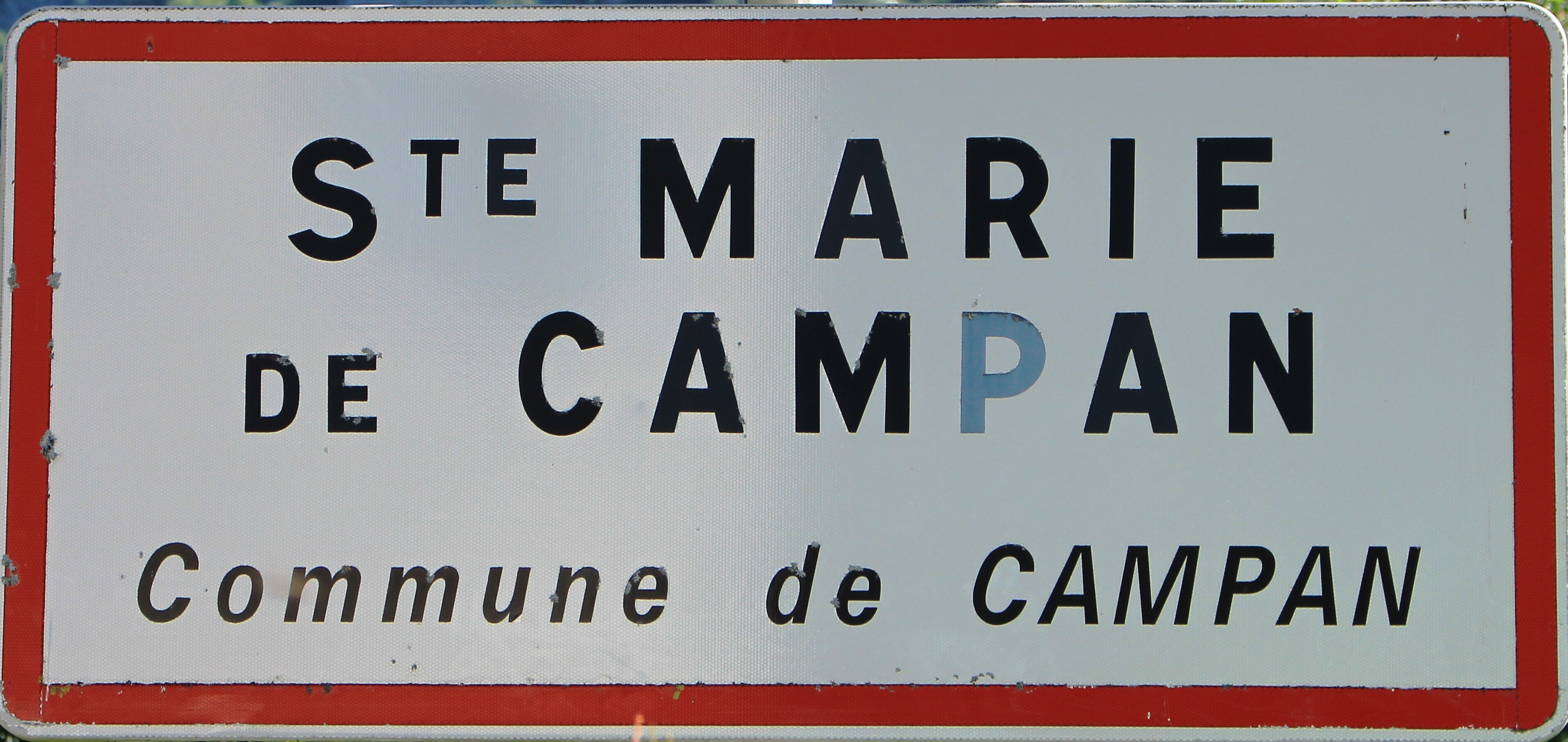

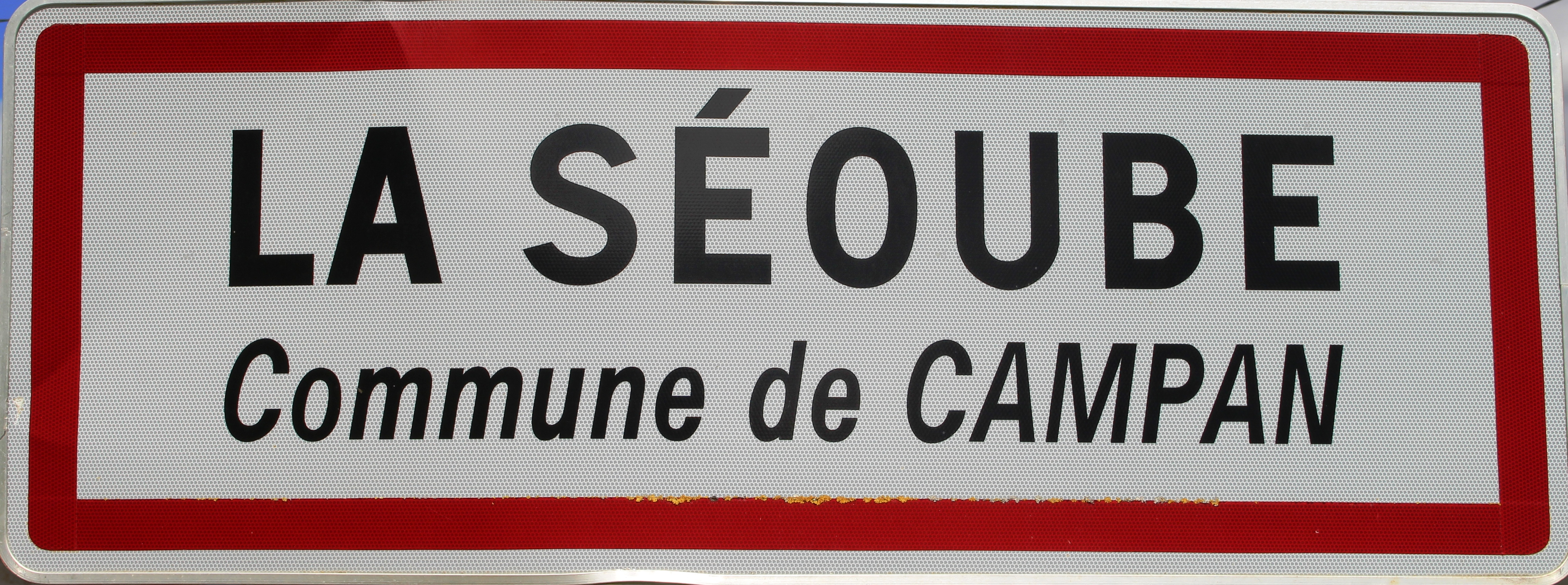

Historically, Campan is made up of three large entities, former parishes:

- Le Bourg, seat of the town hall;
- Sainte-Marie-de-Campan, famous for its role in the Tour de France cycling race;
- La Séoube and its valley leading to the Col d'Aspin.

These three entities are commemorated on the coat of arms (by three bells and three fir trees) and in the commune's motto: "Tria et unum." These are the three hamlets that contain the churches with regular religious services.

The commune is very large (95 km2) and contains many small hamlets. These include:

- Payolle, at the foot of the Col d'Aspin;
- Saint Roch, Galade, and Rimoula, just south of the village;
- Trassouet, below Sainte-Marie;
- Gripp and Artigues at the foot of the Col du Tourmalet;
- Le Sarrat de Bon and Le Sarrat de Gaye, on the hillside between the Gripp and Payolle valleys;
- Le Peyras, above Rimoula.

=== Accommodation ===
In 2011, the total number of dwellings in the commune was 1,912, compared to 1,782 in 2006.

Of these dwellings, 34.5% were primary residences, 57.6% were secondary residences, and 7.9% were vacant. 72.6% of these dwellings were detached houses and 17.4% were apartments. Between 2006 and 2011, the proportion of vacant dwellings in the commune nearly doubled, rising from 4.9% to 7.9%.

The proportion of owner-occupied primary residences was 79.3%, a slight increase compared to 2006 (76.9%). The proportion of vacant social housing units was 1.8% compared to 2.9% previously, with their number decreasing slightly from 19 to 12 between 2006 and 2012.

In both 2011 and 2009, nearly 45% of primary residences had five rooms or more.

=== Major risks ===
The territory of the commune of Campan is vulnerable to various natural hazards: weather (storms, thunderstorms, snow, extreme cold, heatwaves or drought), floods, forest fires, landslides, avalanches and earthquakes (medium seismicity). It is also exposed to a technological risk, the transport of hazardous materials, and to a particular risk: the risk of radon. A site published by BRGM allows you to simply and quickly assess the risks of a property located either by its address or by its plot number.

==== Natural risks ====
Certain parts of the municipal territory are likely to be affected by the risk of flooding due to overflowing rivers, notably the Adour, the Adour de Lesponne, and the Adour de Gripp. The mapping of flood-prone areas in the former Midi-Pyrénées region, carried out as part of the 11th State-Region Planning Contract, aimed at informing citizens and decision-makers about flood risks, is available on the DREAL Occitanie website. The municipality has been declared a state of natural disaster due to damage caused by floods and mudslides in 1982, 1991, 1999, 2009, and 2015.

Campan is exposed to the risk of forest fires. A departmental forest fire protection plan was approved by prefectural decree on April 21, 2020, for the period 2020-2029. The previous one covered the period 2007-2017. The use of fire is governed by two types of regulations. First, the forestry code and the prefectural decree of October 27, 2014, which regulate the use of fire within 200 m of combustible natural areas throughout the department. Second, the regulation established as part of the fight against air pollution, which prohibits the burning of private green waste. Slash-and-burn is regulated by local slash-and-burn commissions (CLE).

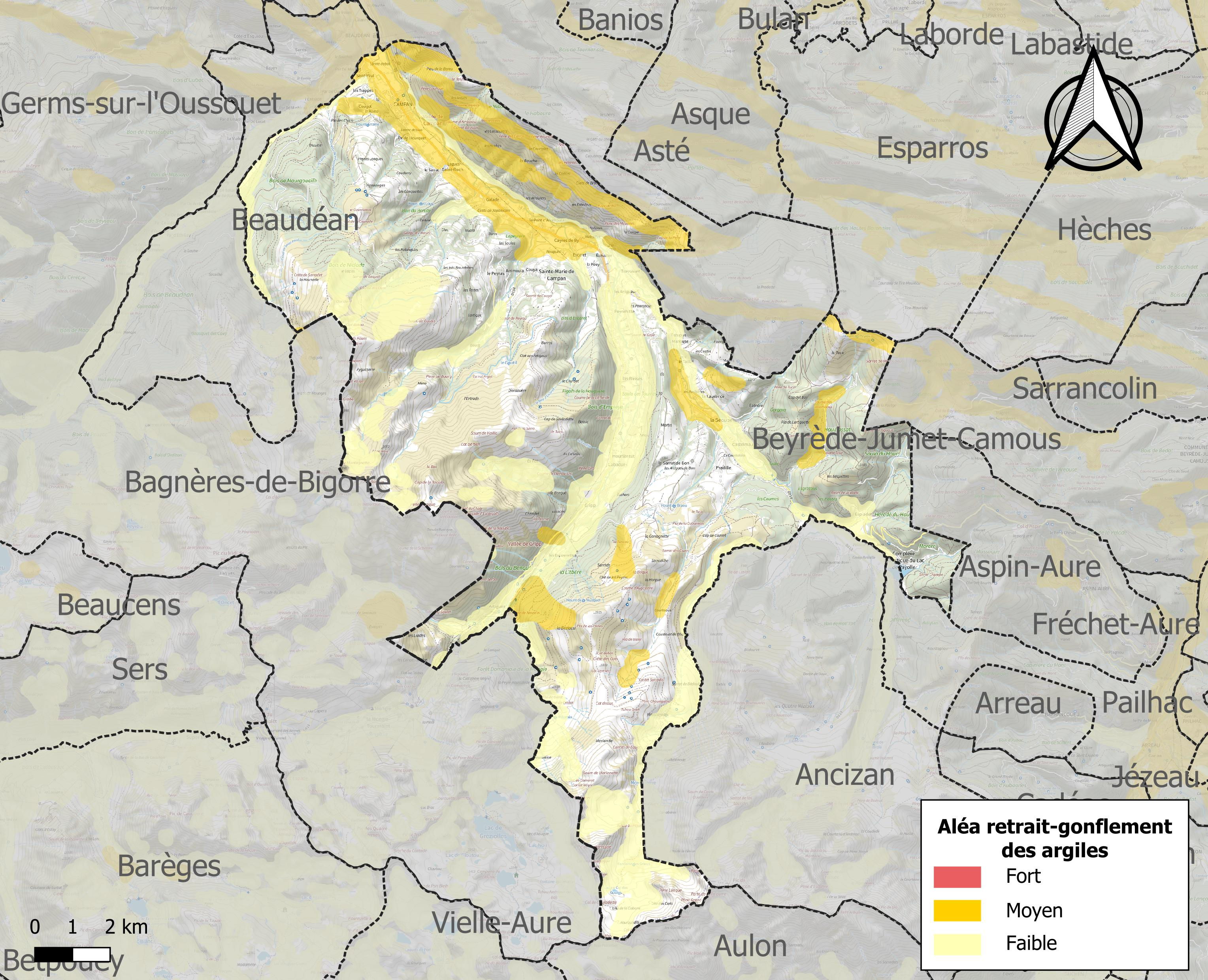
Map of the shrink-swell hazard zones of clay soils in Campan.

The ground movements likely to occur in the commune are soil movements related to the presence of clay and differential settlement.

The shrinkage and swelling of clay soils can cause significant damage to buildings in the event of alternating periods of drought and rain. 11.4% of the communal area is at medium or high risk (44.5% at the departmental level and 48.5% at the national level). Of the 1,575 buildings counted in the municipality in 2019, 592 are at medium or high risk, representing 38%, compared to 75% at the departmental level and 54% at the national level. A map of the national territory's exposure to clay soil shrinkage and swelling is available on the BRGM website.

Furthermore, to better understand the risk of ground subsidence, the national inventory of underground cavities allows for the location of those situated in the commune.

Regarding ground movements, the commune was declared a natural disaster area due to damage caused by ground movements in 1999, by landslides in 1986, and by rockfalls and/or boulder falls in 1994.

The commune is exposed to avalanche risks. Residents at risk should inquire at the town hall about the existence of an avalanche risk prevention plan (PPRA). If applicable, they should identify the measures specific to their home, identify the room with the least exposed facade within the home that could serve as a shelter if necessary, and equip this room with an emergency kit.

==== Technological risk ====
The risk of hazardous materials being transported through the municipality is linked to the fact that a hydrocarbon transport pipeline runs through it. An accident occurring on such infrastructure is likely to have serious effects on property, people, or the environment, depending on the nature of the material being transported. Urban planning provisions may be recommended accordingly.

==== Specific risk ====
In several parts of the country, radon, accumulated in certain homes or other premises, can constitute a significant source of exposure of the population to ionizing radiation. Some municipalities in the department are affected by radon risk to a greater or lesser extent. According to the 2018 classification, the commune of Campan is classified in zone 3, i.e. an area with significant radon potential.

== Etymology ==
The main information can be found in the Dictionnaire toponymique des communes des Hautes-Pyrénées by Michel Grosclaude and Jean-François Le Nail, which lists the historical names of the village:

Attested in the form Campaa in 1285, in the Latin form Campano in 1300, 1342, and 1379 (masculine form of the Latin campania, "plain, open land," probably inherited from a Late Latin campanum), Campan in 1429, Campan in the late 18th century.

The etymology of the name Campan is not defined. Some believe the name is derived from the Compani people. Others believe it was chosen following the establishment of a Roman soldier camp. Finally, some speak of a corruption of the Latin campana, "small bell." This latter etymology is supported by the three bells found on the town's coat of arms.

The inhabitants of Campan are called the Campanois. This name is found in the town's municipal bulletins.

Its Occitan name is Campan (only the pronunciation and stress change, not the spelling). The corresponding figurative pronunciation is [kam'pœ] or [kam'pa]. The Occitan names of the hamlets are Senta Maria, era Seuva, Cabadur, Galada, and Palhòla.

== History ==
=== Antiquity ===
In 56 BC, the Roman Lucinius Crassus subdued the Bigeriones. It wasn't until 28 BC that the Campon tribe was defeated by the Roman general Valerius Messala, near Payolle. For five centuries, the Pax Romana reigned over the Upper Adour Valley.

Bigorre began to be evangelized around the year 350. In the Campan Valley, the first church was built at Beaudéan.

=== Middle Ages ===
The Visigoths settled in Bigorre as early as 412 and remained there for a century.

In 733, remnants of the Arab army (repelled at Poitiers by Charles Martel a year earlier) arrived in Campan. They were defeated by the Campones. The survivors settled on the right bank of the Adour River (in what would become the Cagot quarter) or in the Lesponne Valley.

Between the mid-9th and mid-16th centuries, the inhabitants of Bigorre, including those of Campan, disputed amongst themselves and with outsiders over the boundaries of their various territories and their owners. The first boundary demarcation took place in 850, and further legal proceedings were held in 1524 to determine the ownership of the woods located above Lake Payolle. That same year, the Cistercian monks of Escaladieu Abbey donated part of their lands in the Gripp Valley to Cieutat and part to Campan.

In 1360, Bigorre became English, following the Treaty of Brétigny. It remained so until 1368, when a revolt by the inhabitants allowed Bertrand du Guesclin to retake the county.

In 1429, Campan was recognized as a "town," which allowed it to send two representatives to the Estates of Bigorre, which brought together representatives of the three estates each year.

In 1470, the consuls of Campan obtained from Gaston IV, Count of Bigorre, the right to imprison. This was primarily to legalize an already existing practice.

=== Renaissance ===
The Wars of Religion also impacted the Campan Valley. Montgomery's attempt to conquer Bigorre in 1568 did not reach Campan, but the walls of the fortified village were nonetheless rebuilt. The village contributed to the creation of a Catholic army by sending soldiers, a cow, and 28 écus (a local currency). In 1574, a reconciliation between Catholics and Protestants was attempted by Anthoine de Gramont, a knight of the king's order. It was unsuccessful.

In 1582, the inhabitants of Campan obtained from Henry of Navarre the right to hold a market on Fridays, in exchange for bringing their own produce.

At the end of the 16th century, between 1588 and 1589, a plague epidemic struck Bigorre, affecting Bagnères and Campan. It was stopped by the devotion of the inhabitants of Bagnères and other villages to Our Lady of Médous, following the orders of Liloye, a young woman to whom the Virgin Mary had appeared.

The election of the village consuls was revised in 1594 with the drafting of a short set of internal regulations for the commune. The people of Campan sought to reconcile the practice of democracy with the growing powers of the consuls while also trying to avoid nepotism.

From 1600 onward, a golden age began for the commune of Campan. There were 700 households, or 3,500 inhabitants throughout the valley, a third of whom lived in the town center. Trade flowed in and out of the valley: livestock and butter were exported, and wine and wheat were imported. Spain contributed to the wealth, through the employment of Campan residents as seasonal workers or through ongoing trade. Notaries, lawyers, teachers, doctors (general practitioners, surgeons, midwives, and apothecaries), innkeepers, millers, artists, and even a goldsmith settled in Campan. More manual trades such as mason, locksmith, carpenter, joiner, and blacksmith were also well represented. Finally, some residents of Campan obtained positions in the upper echelons of the state, particularly in administration, taxation, and the Water and Forestry service.

In 1607, Campan was annexed to the Crown as a patrimonial property, and the town confirmed that it recognized no other lord than the king.

The plague epidemic of 1628, originating in Toulouse, completely spared the valley. This was not the case with the epidemic of 1653. It reached Bagnères in August, then Campan in September. Despite the apothecary's elixirs and ointments, despite the efforts of the health officers to maintain public health, and despite the care provided by the Capuchin friars of Médous, the epidemic wreaked havoc and spread throughout the valley. The hamlet of La Seoube saw only one survivor out of its 400 inhabitants. Notarial acts were reduced by a factor of five during the year. This plague earned the inhabitants of Campan the right to be exempted from taxes in 1654.

In 1694, a fire ravaged a large part of the town: seventy houses, the market hall, and the church were consumed by the flames. The fire was caused by two thieves from the Neste Valley. Pursued for their thefts, they set fire to a disreputable tavern in an attempt to take advantage of the confusion to escape. The two thieves were apprehended during a manhunt in the woods of Escaladieu, organized by the abbey and the communes of Bonnemazon and Cieutat. They were taken to Toulouse where they were tried and condemned to be burned alive.

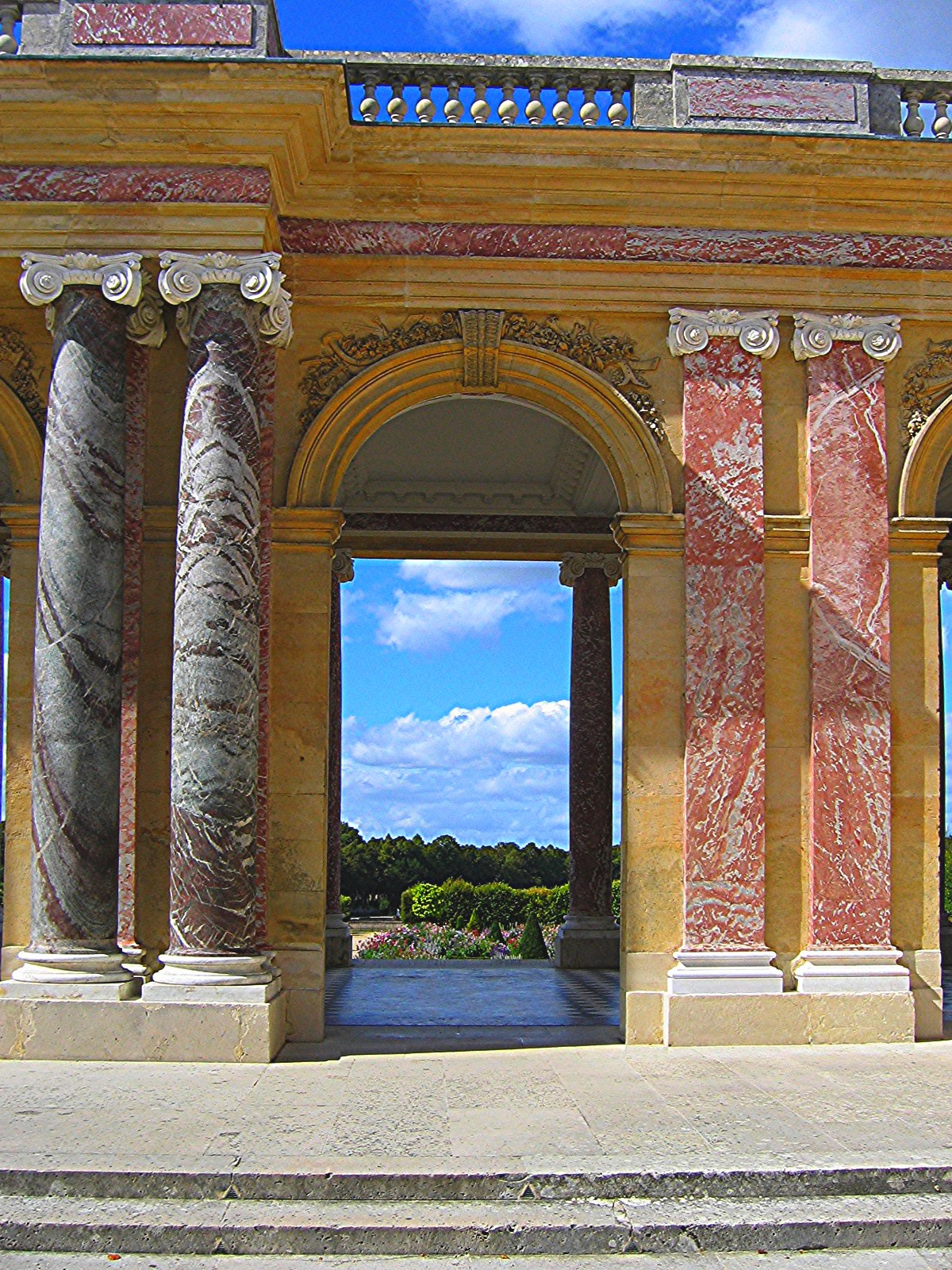
Loggia of the Grand Trianon, columns in Campan marble.

In 1700, the renowned cabinetmaker André-Charles Boulle incorporated Campan marble into his furniture, combining it with ebony, pewter, copper, and tortoiseshell.

In 1728, 1762, 1774, and 1776, women were emancipated by their fathers, before a notary, so that they could act, conduct business, and negotiate in their own names. Women played a particular role in the Campan Valley, since a family's inheritance went to the firstborn child, even if it was a girl.

In 1784, Pierre Bernard Palassou wrote that a cave with an inscription recounts the visit of the Countess of Brionne to this site in 1766. Heinrich August Ottokar Reichard specifies that this cave is located on the right bank of the Adour River at the foot of the Montagne Grise (Grey Mountain). Pierre Henri Valenciennes, for his part, mentions the disappearance of the cave's stalactites.

In 1779, Nicolas Gobet mentions in Campan the presence of copper mines, a concession held by Messrs. Thorin and Poli.

=== French Revolution ===
On February 29, 1776, the king, during his council at Versailles, ordered the sale and alienation of the seigneury of Campan to the highest and final bidder. The inhabitants of Campan were thus forced to repurchase their own property, sending a representative to Paris. They attempted to plead their case with the intendant of Auch, appointed by the king, but to no avail.

A few years later, in 1779, the king's reforms to municipal regulations reached Campan. These reforms mandated a mayor, a deputy mayor, two aldermen, six councilors, a representative, and a clerk, replacing the four consuls and two guards previously elected. The mayor would be appointed by the king. The commune addressed a petition to the king, proposing that His Majesty grant them, in exchange for payment, the privilege of electing six consuls annually, according to ancient custom, distributed among the districts, without a mayor or deputy mayor. The king agreed in exchange for two thousand livres. However, he continued to take an interest in the commune. In 1782, he reappointed the same man from Campan as first consul, the same man who had been elected to that position in 1780. This reappointment greatly displeased the inhabitants and the first consul himself. Yet, during the inquiry into the parishes requested by the Bishop of Bigorre in 1783, when asked "Who is the lord of the parish?", Campan replied, "We have no other lord than the king."

In 1780, the people of Campan were described to Marshal Richelieu as being rebellious, independent, and causing the Count of Beaudéan great distress.

During those same years, the people of Campania also had difficulties with Abbots Fatta, then Torné.

=== Napoleonic era ===
In 1820, Campan, with 4,329 inhabitants, was the third largest town in the department after Tarbes and Bagnères-de-Bigorre. Fifty mills were operating there in 1825.

In 1821, Cyprien-Prosper Brard, in his work on mineralogy, mentions the three types of Campan marble: red, green, and Isabella.[44] He also mentions four Campan marble columns in the Royal Museum of Fine Arts of Paris, in the gallery of Old Masters (Salle de la Diane). Pierre Toussaint de La Boulinière writes that Campan marble was widely used during the reigns of Louis XIV and Louis XV, notably for the Grand Trianon and Versailles. Campan marble was also used by Barthélemy Prieur in the Celestines Church in Paris for the monument to the heart of Constable Anne de Montmorency.

In 1822, Grigori Vladimirovitch Orlov described the customs of the inhabitants of Campan.

=== Contemporary era ===
==== 20th century ====
In the 1960s, an experimental holiday village was established in the hamlet of Gripp, under the management of the Société Nationale des Pétroles d'Aquitaine (now Elf Aquitaine), which wanted to offer its employees a winter resort near La Mongie and a summer camp in the mountains for their children. This village, established in July 1967, comprised around twenty bubble houses designed by the architect and urban planner Jean-Benjamin Maneval. These bubbles, prefabricated in a factory, were assembled on-site under the architect's supervision, as evidenced by a photographic report taken at the time and posted online by his daughter, Virginie. Each unit consisted of six interlocking shells suspended from a metal frame resting on a concrete base supporting the floor, the whole structure being topped with a hemispherical dome. Each bubble, measuring 36 square meters, could accommodate up to six people and included all modern comforts.

The experimental village was dismantled in 1998, but one of the bubbles (a white one) was acquired by the Museum of Modern and Contemporary Art of Saint-Étienne Métropole for its 2006 exhibition. Another model of these bubbles, dating from 1968 and brown in color, was exhibited by Galerie Rousse at the Milan Triennale in 2015.

By decree of March 29, 2019, part of the territory of the commune of Arreau was annexed to the commune of Campan.

== Administration ==
The Mayor of Campan is Gérard Ara, whose term of office expires in 2014. Campan is unusual among French communes in having two electoral colleges for municipal elections: the township on one hand, and Sainte-Marie La Séoube on the other.

The current mayor of Campan in 2025 is Alexandre Pujot-Menjouet.

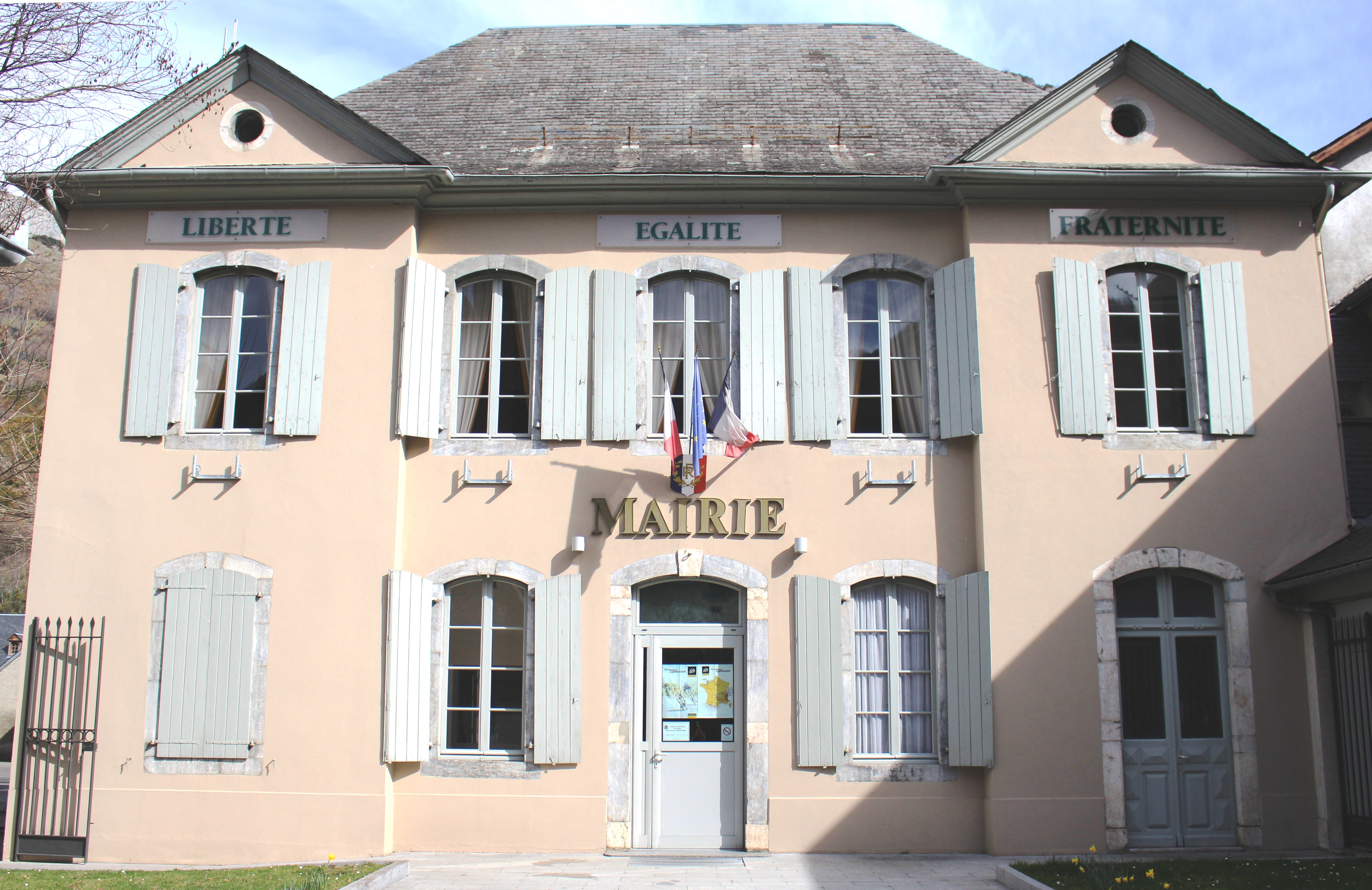
The town hall of Campan in 2016.

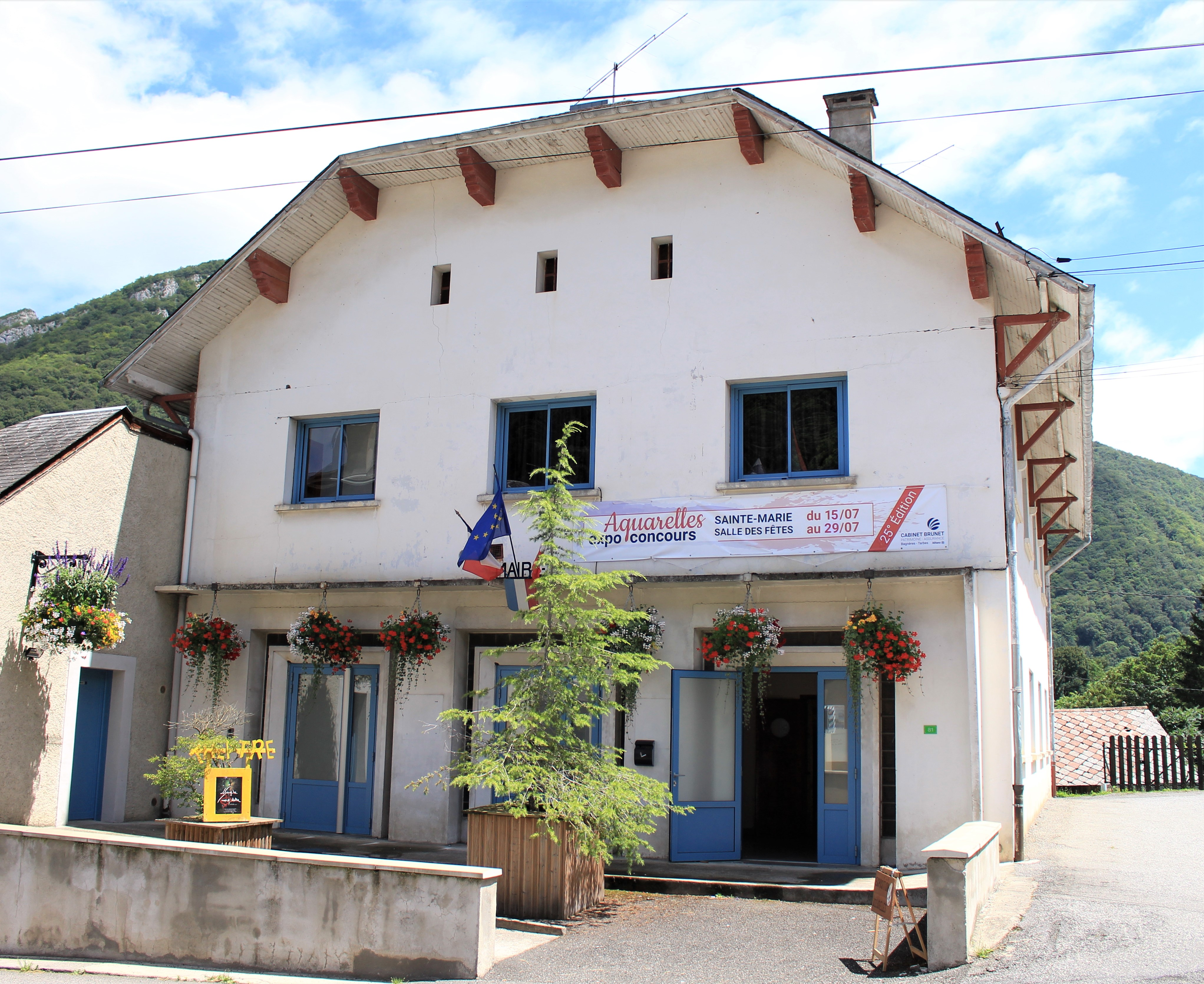
The town hall of Sainte-Marie de Campan in 2023.

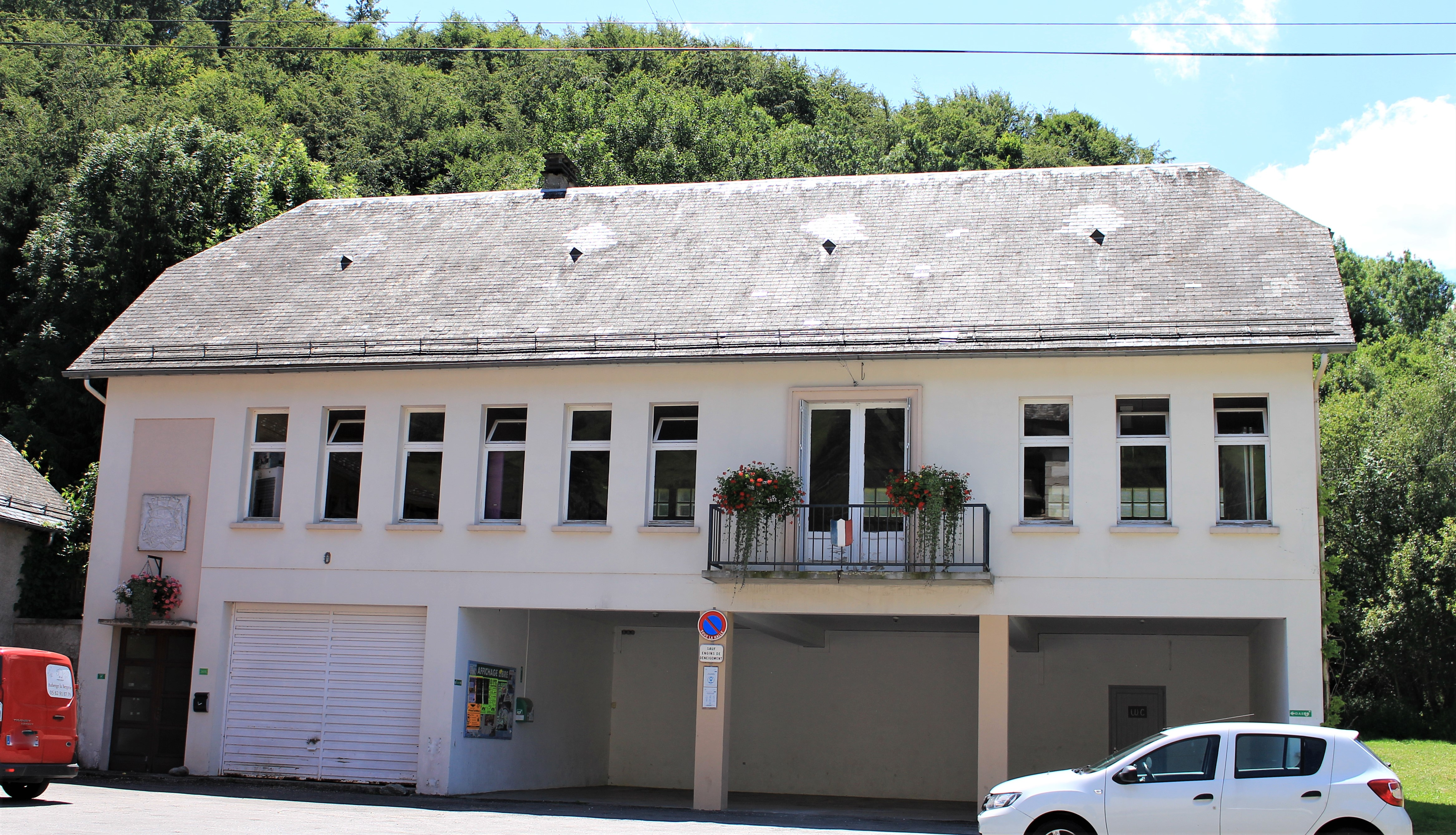
The town hall of La Séoube in 2023.

== Population and society ==
Campan is a rural commune with 1,245 inhabitants in 2023, after having experienced a population peak of 4,329 inhabitants in 1821. Its inhabitants are called Campanois or Campanoises in French.

Historical population
Year	Pop.	±% p.a.
1968	1,546	—
1975	1,481	−0.61%
1982	1,458	−0.22%
1990	1,390	−0.60%
1999	1,483	+0.72%
2007	1,468	−0.13%
2012	1,381	−1.21%
2017	1,332	−0.72%
2023	1,245	−1.12%
Source: INSEE

=== Health ===
There is a pharmacy and two general practitioners in the village center. Private nurses have also set up practices in the valley. The nearest hospital is in Bagnères-de-Bigorre. It has an emergency department.

=== Sports ===
Selection of views of sports facilities

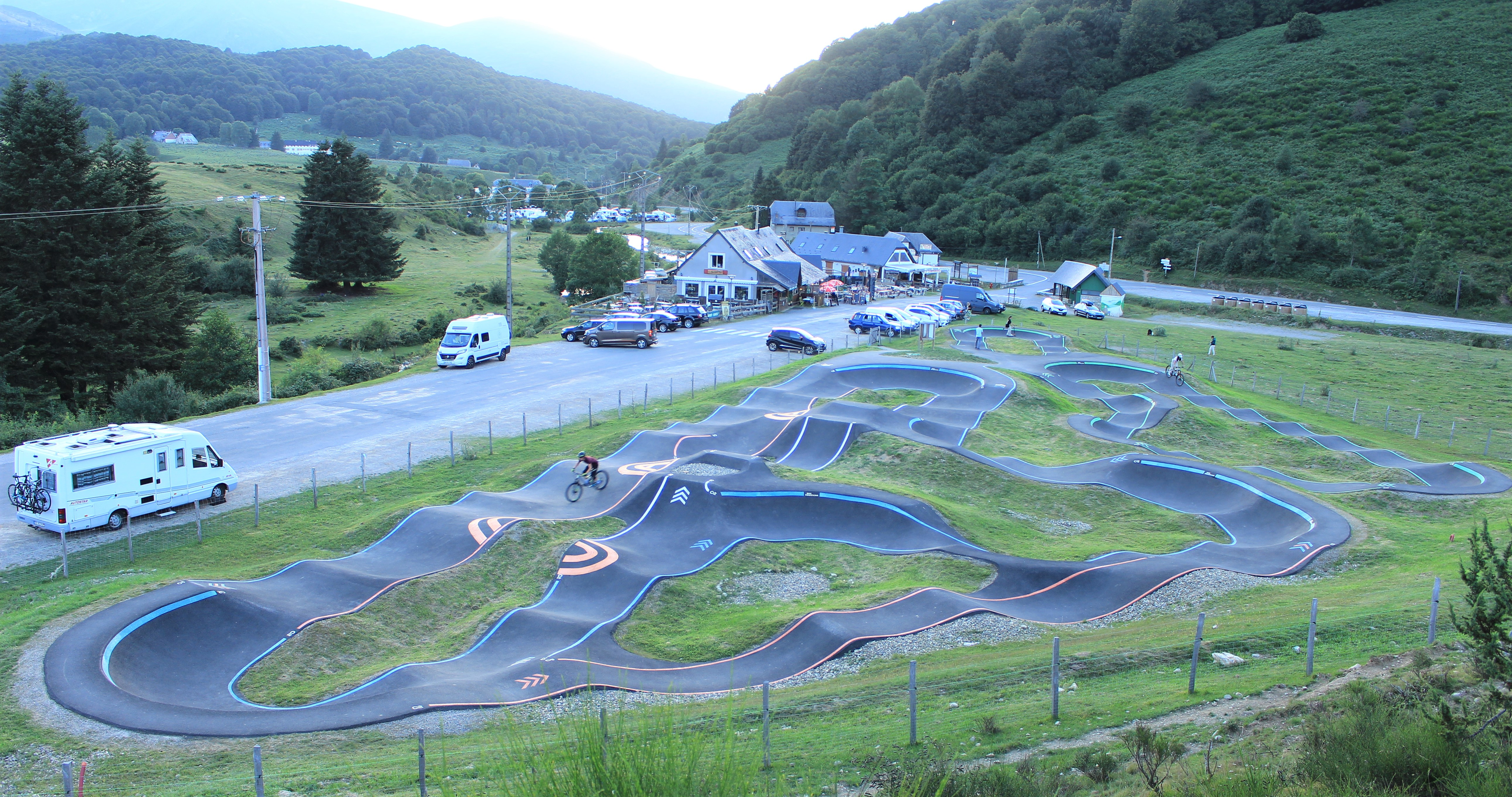
The pump track in Payolle.

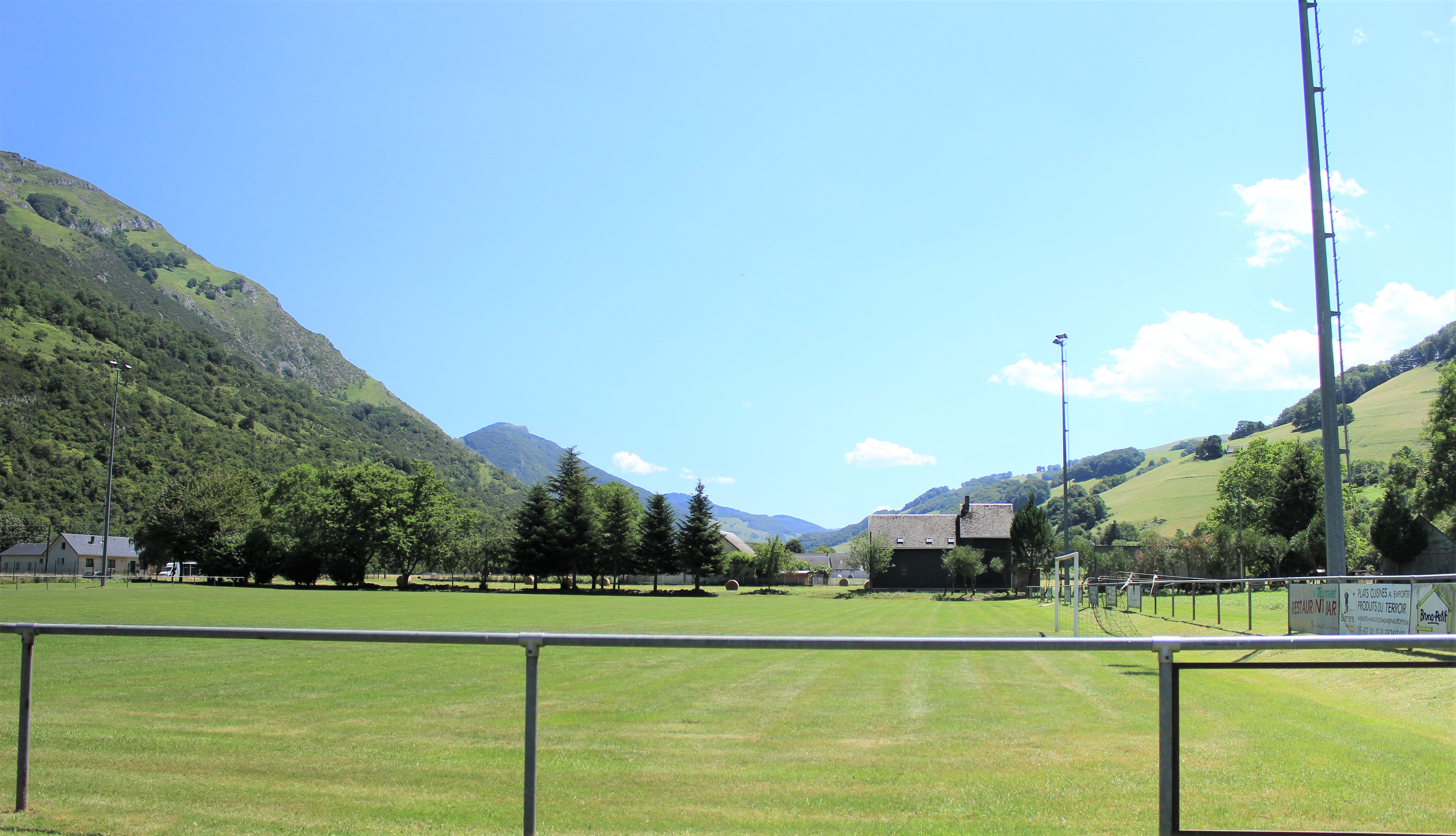
The football stadium.

=== Cults ===
The parish of Campan is part of the Diocese of Tarbes and Lourdes. There are three churches in Campan that hold regular religious services: the Church of Saint John the Baptist in the town center, the Church of Saint Mary in Sainte-Marie, and the Church of Saint Vincent de Paul in La Séoube. The rectory is located in the town center.

The nearest synagogue is in Tarbes, on Rue Gaston-Manent.

There are two mosques in Tarbes, one on Place Germain-Claverie and the other on Avenue Antoine-de-Saint-Exupéry.

The town of Bagnères-de-Bigorre has a Protestant church on Avenue Prosper-Nogues.

== Education ==
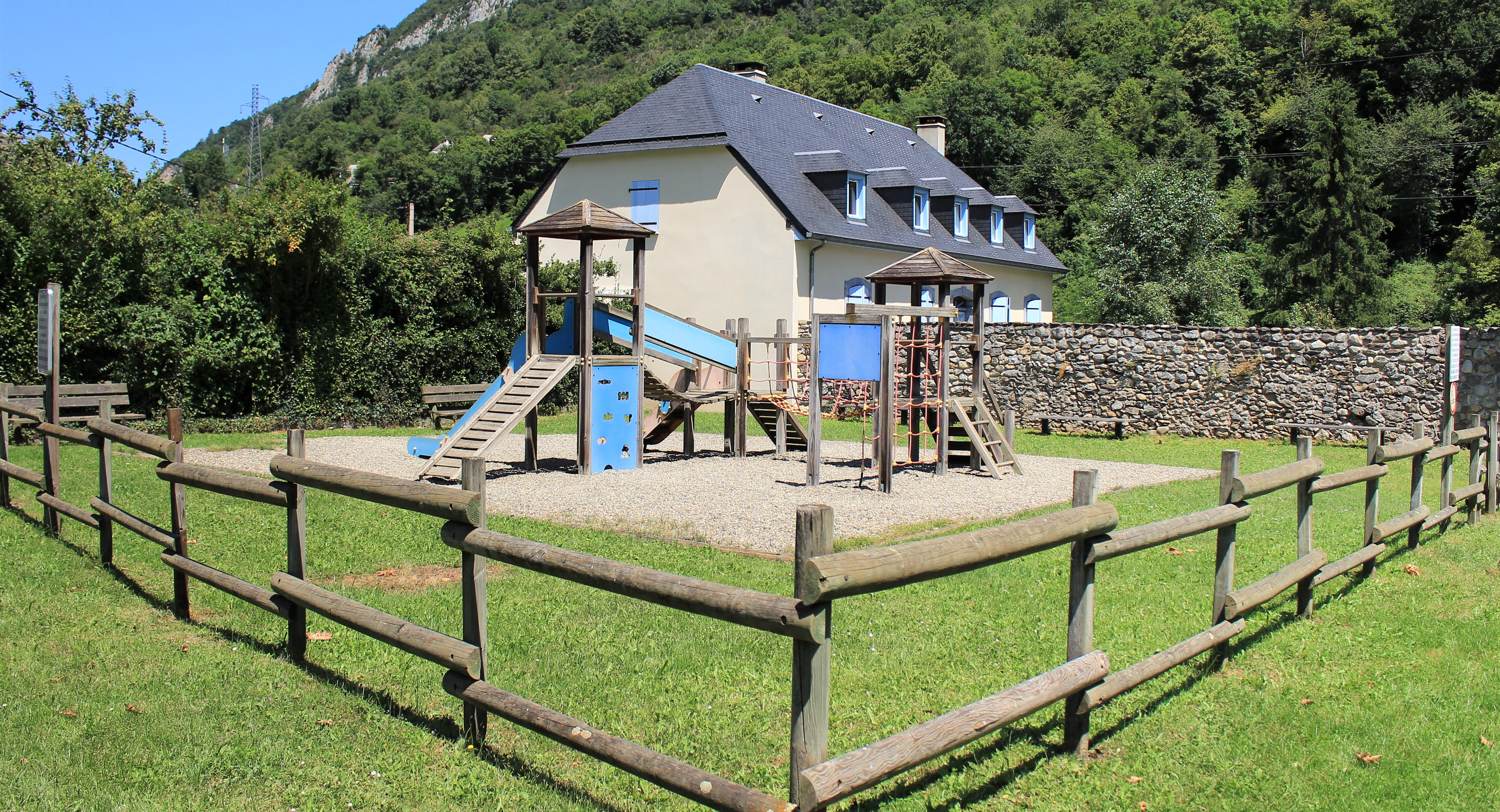
The playground.

The town of Campan is part of the Toulouse school district, and therefore Zone C. Campan has two schools: a public preschool in the town center and a public elementary school in the Sainte-Marie district.

The town also houses two branches of the Jean-Marie-Larrieu Center, a public medical and social care facility, in a complex of buildings located north of the town center, in the Saint-Paul district. The ITEPro unit can accommodate 10 people aged 12 to 16, and the IMPro unit has 37 places for people aged 12 to 20. The target population includes children and adolescents with behavioral disorders and intellectual disabilities, with or without associated conditions.

Selection of views of school buildings

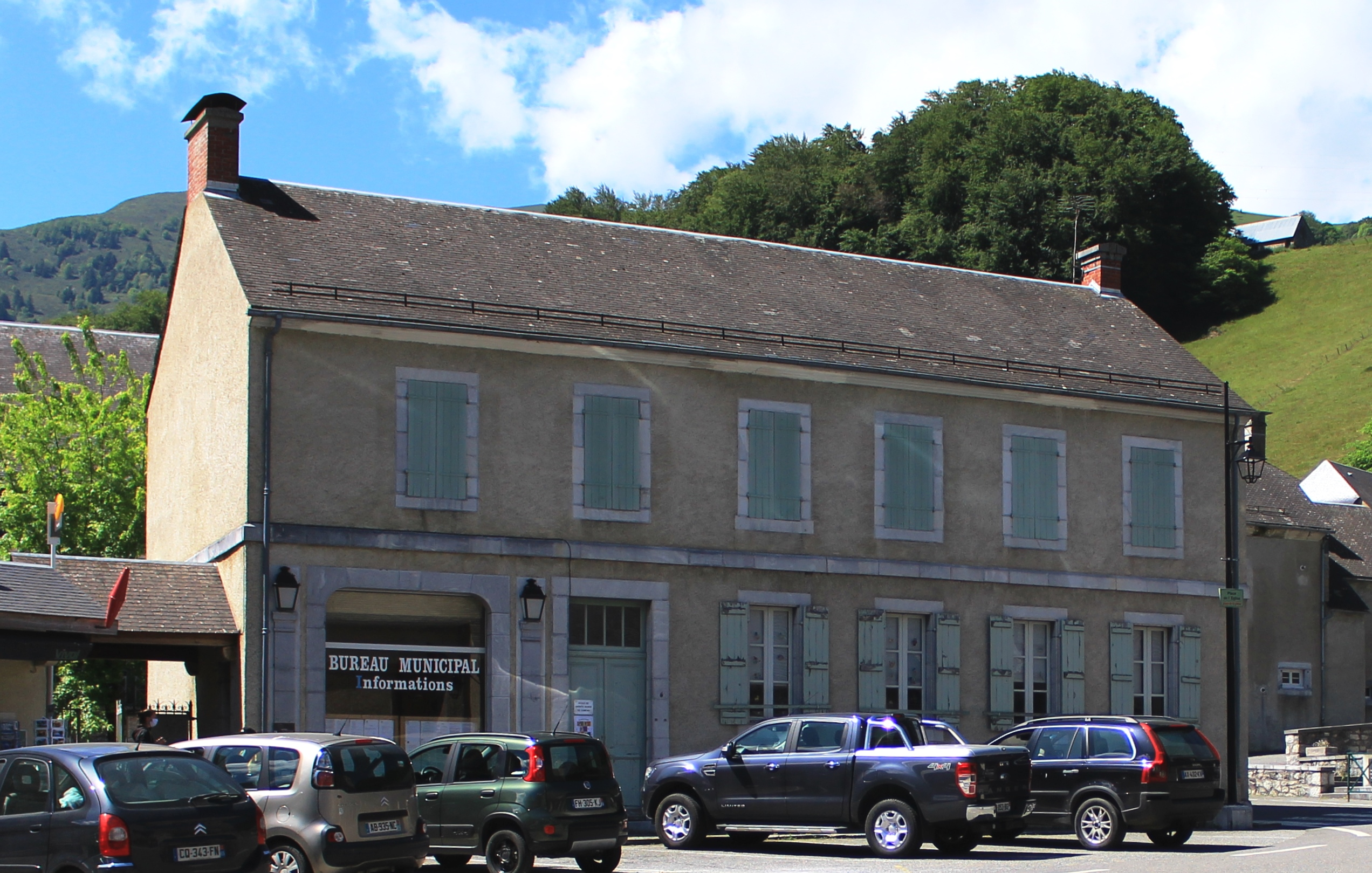
Sainte-Marie nursery school..

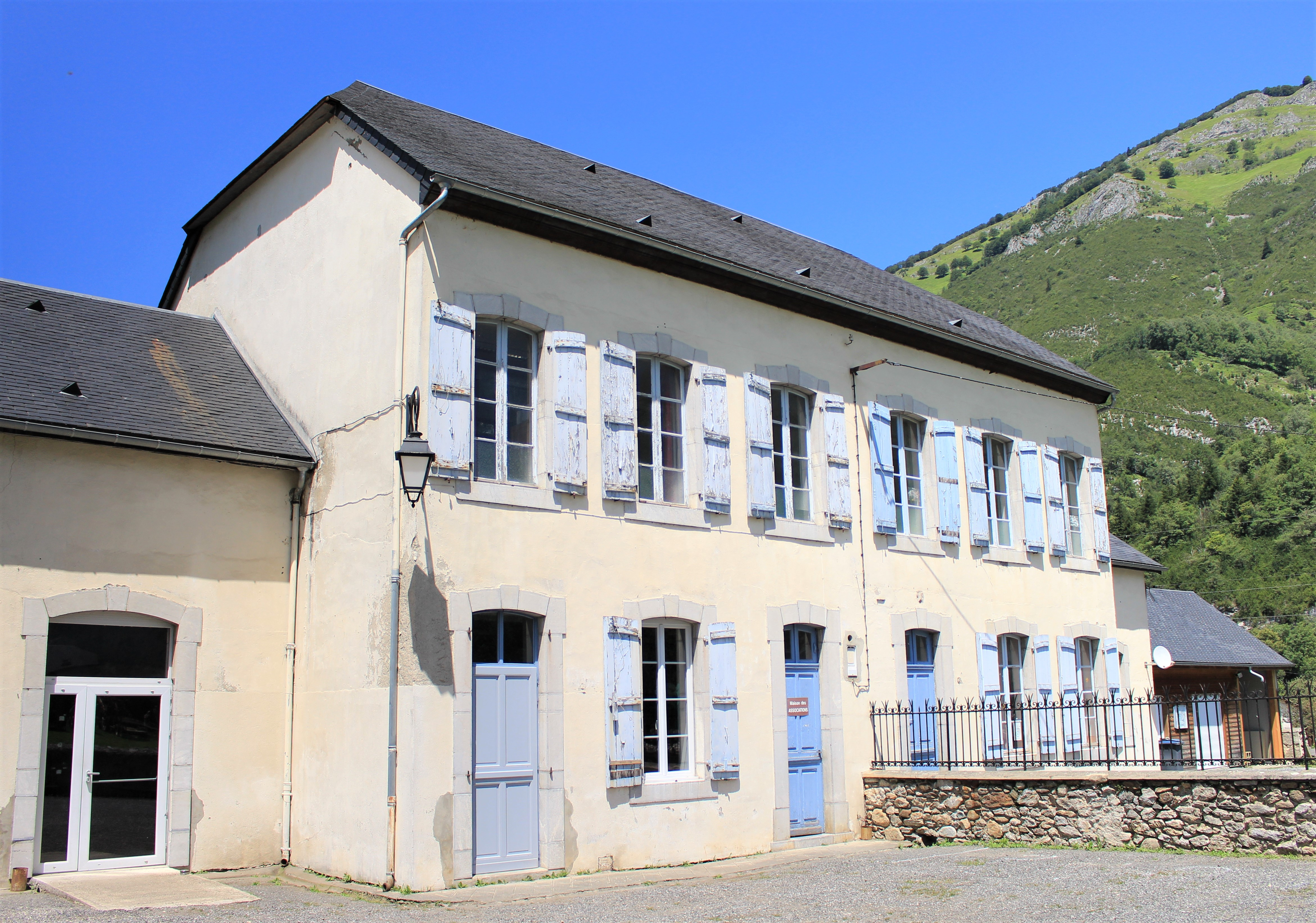
Galad's old school.

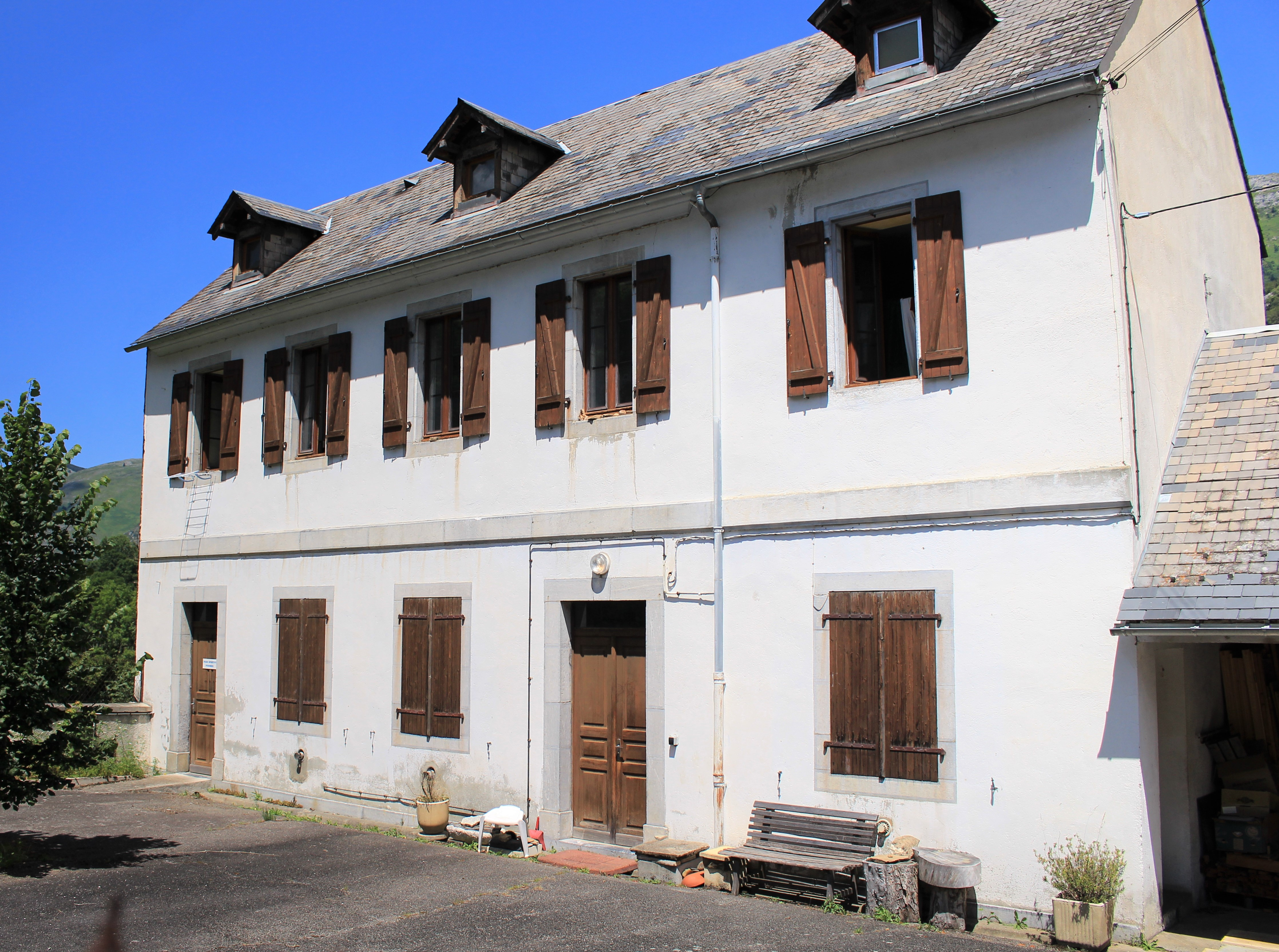
The old school of La Séoube.

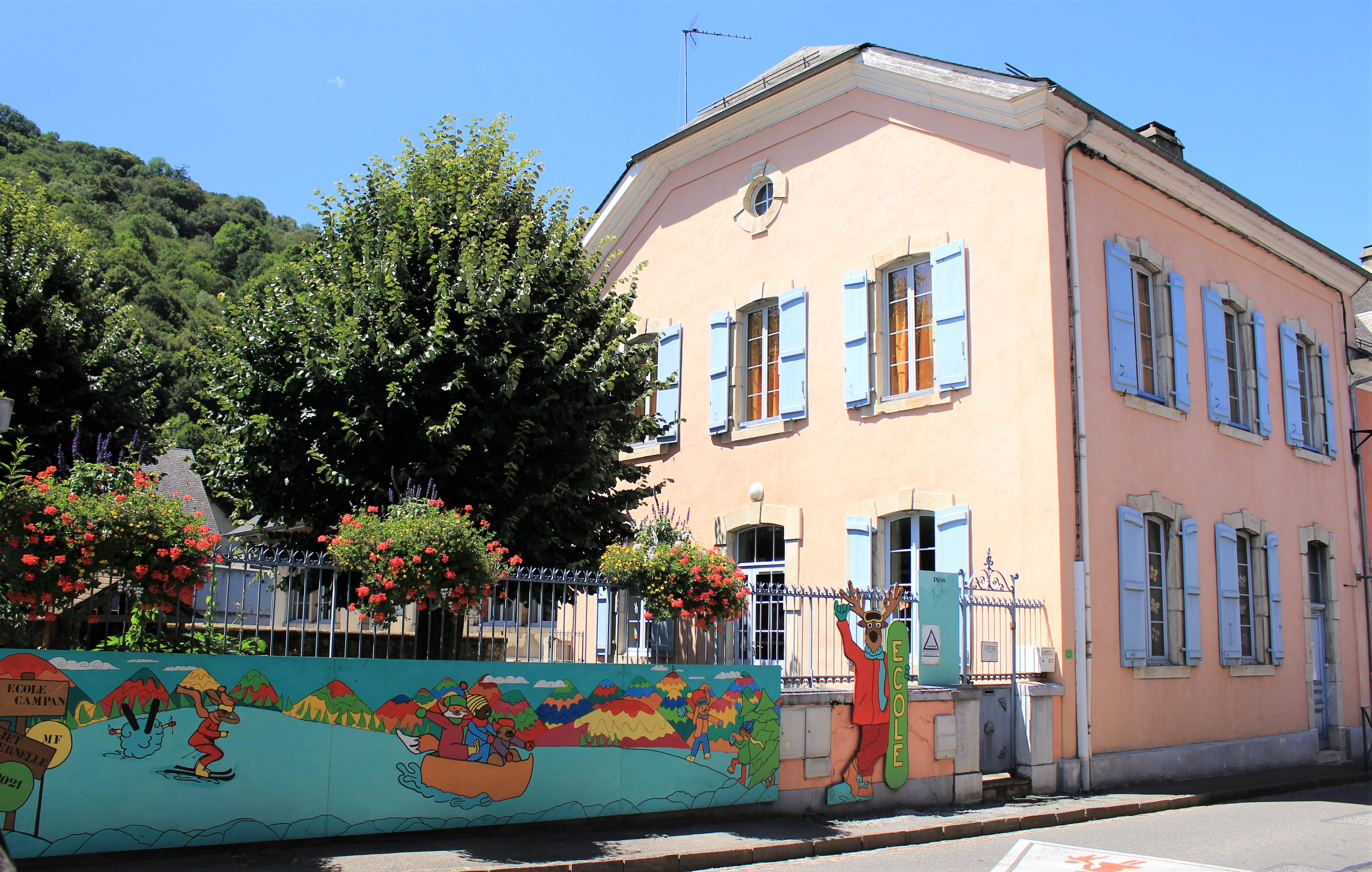
The Campan school.

== Economy ==
=== Population income and taxation ===
In 2011, the number of tax households in the commune was 679, and the median tax income per household was €24,872.

=== Businesses and commerce ===
As of December 31, 2011, Campan had 256 establishments: 74 in agriculture-forestry-fishing, 15 in industry, 28 in construction, 101 in trade-transportation-miscellaneous services, and 38 in the administrative sector.

In 2013, nine companies were established in Campan.

=== Others ===
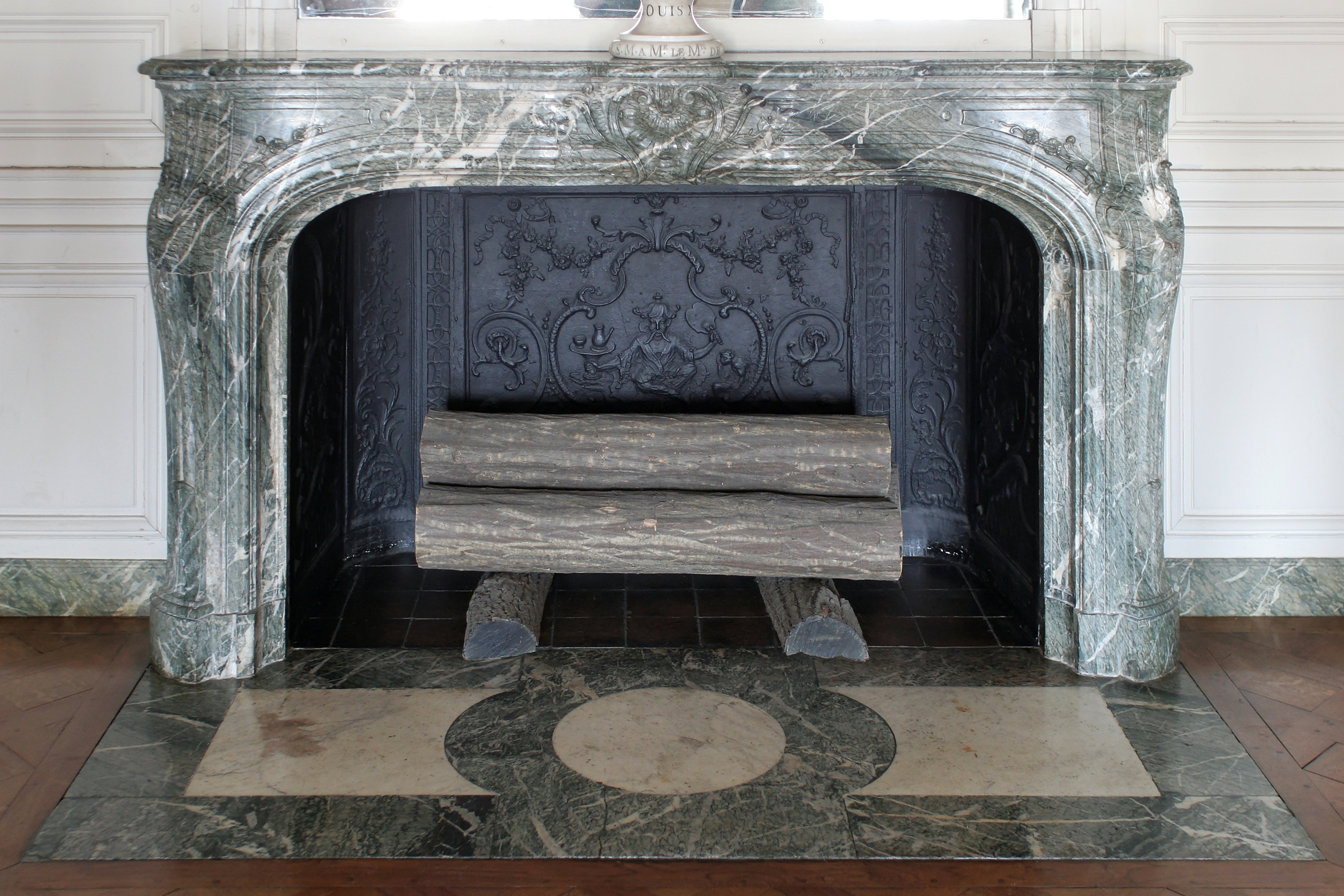
Campan marble fireplace, Palace of Versailles.

In the past, the main resources were wood, marble, and livestock farming, which produced milk, butter, and wool. Wood, butter, and wool are depicted in bas-relief on the Bourg war memorial. Even before the 18th century, butter was renowned for its quality. According to Larcher's Gleanings (1696-1777), the butter from the Campan Valley is "much better than anywhere else in the Bigorre mountains" (volume 9, page 60).

Since the end of the 20th century, marble has no longer been a resource for the commune. Currently, tourism supplements agricultural and forestry resources. Since 2005, a Pyrenean goat competition has been held annually during the Sainte-Marie-de-Campan fair.

== Places of interest ==
=== Cultural facilities ===
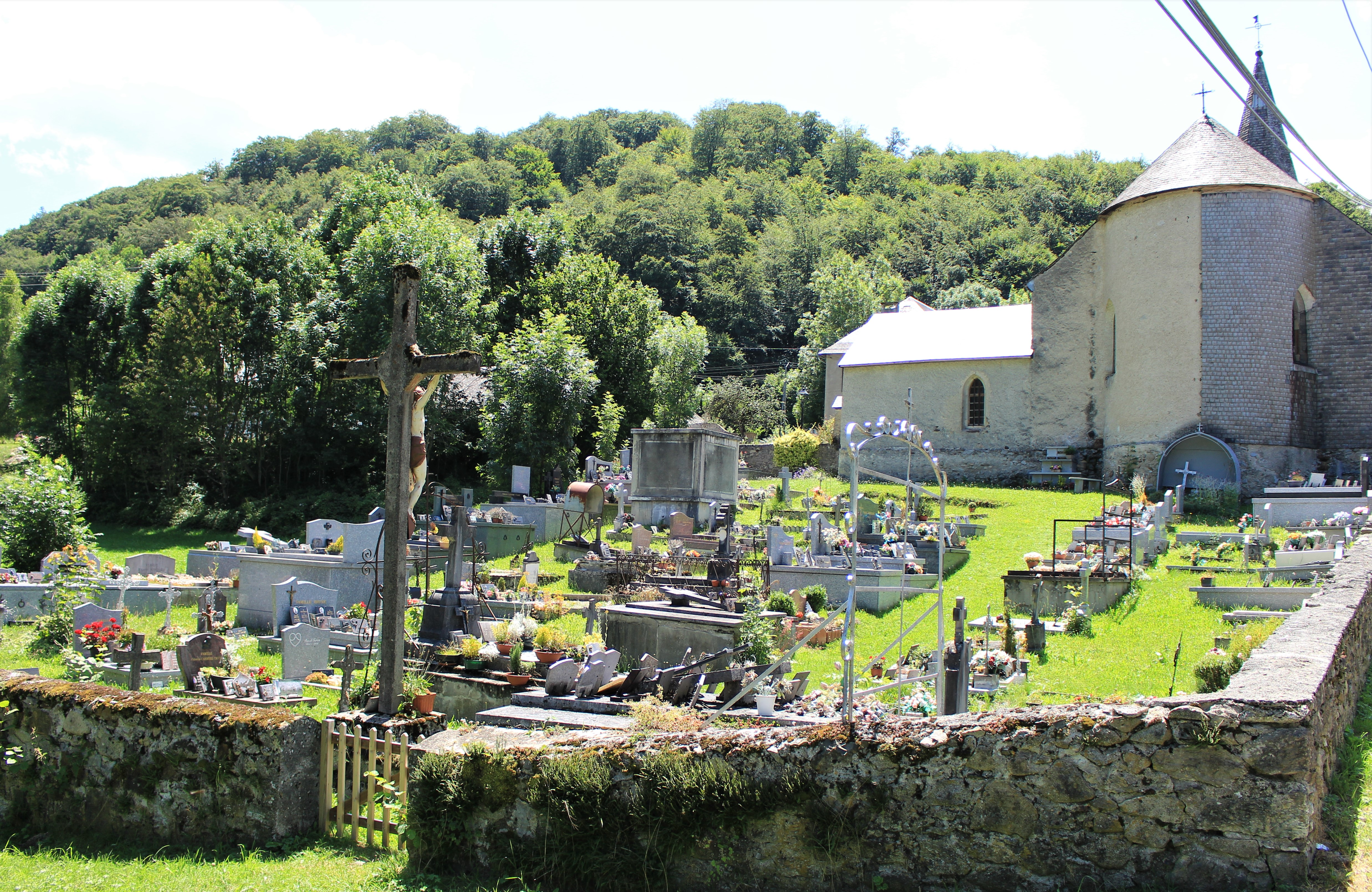
The cemetery at La Séoube.

The village, along with the hamlets of Galade, Sainte-Marie, and La Séoube, has public halls for community meetings and cultural events. The largest of these is the village hall, which was recently renovated to improve accessibility for people with reduced mobility.

In the village center, there is a museum called "Le Carrefour des Patrimoines" (The Crossroads of Heritage), created and managed by the "Société des Amis de Mme Campan" (Friends of Mrs. Campan Society), a non-profit organization established on February 11, 1997. Currently housed in the former village primary school, the museum presents the history of the valley through reproductions of photographs and a permanent exhibition of traditional objects and costumes. Guided tours are available upon request.

=== Artistic heritage ===
The Campan Valley boasts unique characteristics in its folk arts and traditions, whether in dances, songs, or costumes.

The book "Enta Dançar Bigorra," published by the Federation of Secular Organizations of the Hautes-Pyrénées, lists seven traditional dances collected by Marinette Aristow-Journoud: Eths berrets, Chiroli, Eth Vielh Jano, Mair mair, Berogina, L'escargòlh, and Eras cintas. These dances are mentioned in the writings of Philadelphe de Gerde. In Jean Poueigh's book "Chansons populaires des Pyrénées françaises, traditions, mœurs, usages" (Popular Songs of the French Pyrenees: Traditions, Customs, and Practices), which predates Ms. Aristow-Journoud's research, references to some of these dances as songs: Mair mair and Berogina.

These songs and dances are kept alive and presented to the public by the folk group "Les Pastourelles de Campan" during summer shows or special events.

=== Cultural events and festivities ===
==== Community festival ====
The patron saint festivals vary from one neighborhood to another.

The main village festival takes place on Saint John's Day, June 24th. In accordance with tradition, a large bonfire is lit and blessed by the priest of Campan. This is followed by a lantern parade and a fireworks display. The Sainte-Marie neighborhood festival takes place on August 15th, the Feast of the Assumption of the Virgin Mary.

==== The Mariolles Festival ====
In 1991, the Brotherhood of the Mariolles was founded and inducted its first members. The Mariolles, named in honor of Dominique Gaye-Mariolle, are chosen for their service to the Upper Adour Valley and/or the town of Campan, characterized by dynamism, determination, selflessness, and a sense of humor.

Each year, on the second Sunday of July, during the Mariolles Festival, new members are inducted. These newcomers are chosen by the Brotherhood members. By tacit agreement, active political figures are ineligible for induction. The Mariolles Festival runs from Friday evening to Sunday evening and features dances, musical meals, a parade, and folk performances. These performances are provided by Eths Autes and Les Pastourelles de Campan (respectively a traditional music group and a folk arts and traditions company), as well as by other folk groups from France and other countries.

It is during the Mariolles festival that the Mounaques are set up in the neighborhoods of Campan.

=== Religious heritage ===
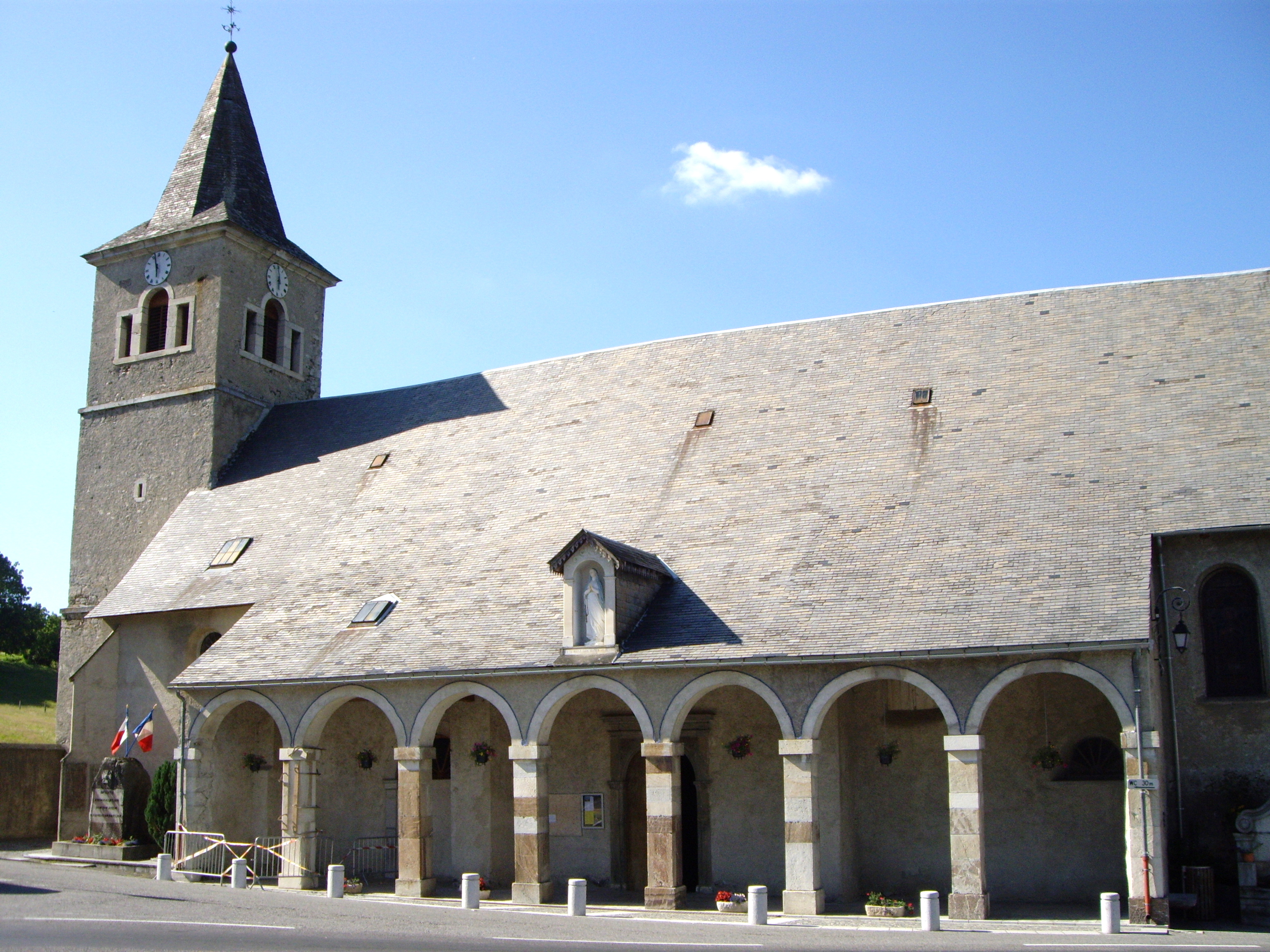
Church of Notre-Dame-de-l'Assomption in Sainte-Marie-de-Campan

- The church of Saint-Jean-Baptiste in Campan: it was constructed in the sixteenth century and contains a baroque altarpiece dating from the eighteenth century, from the school of the Ferrère brothers of Asté.
- The church Notre-Dame-de-l'Assomption in Sainte-Marie-de-Campan.
- The church Saint-Vincent-de-Paul in La Séoube.

=== The war memorial ===
Sculpted by the artist Edmond Chrètien of Bordeaux, and erected in 1926 at the front of the church, to the right of the south door, the monument to the dead of Campan is distinguished by its sober and touching appearance.

Unlike the heroic soldiers who decorate many of the war memorials in France, the statue that dominates this monument represents a meditating woman, her face practically invisible, who wears the traditional clothing of the people of the valley. The memorial pays homage to the dead of the wars of the twentieth century from each of the sections of the commune: Le Bourg, Sainte Marie and La Séoube.

Finally, some bas-reliefs evoke 'peace rediscovered' through representations of the three main goods of the commune: wood, butter and wool.

Selection of views of municipal war memorials.

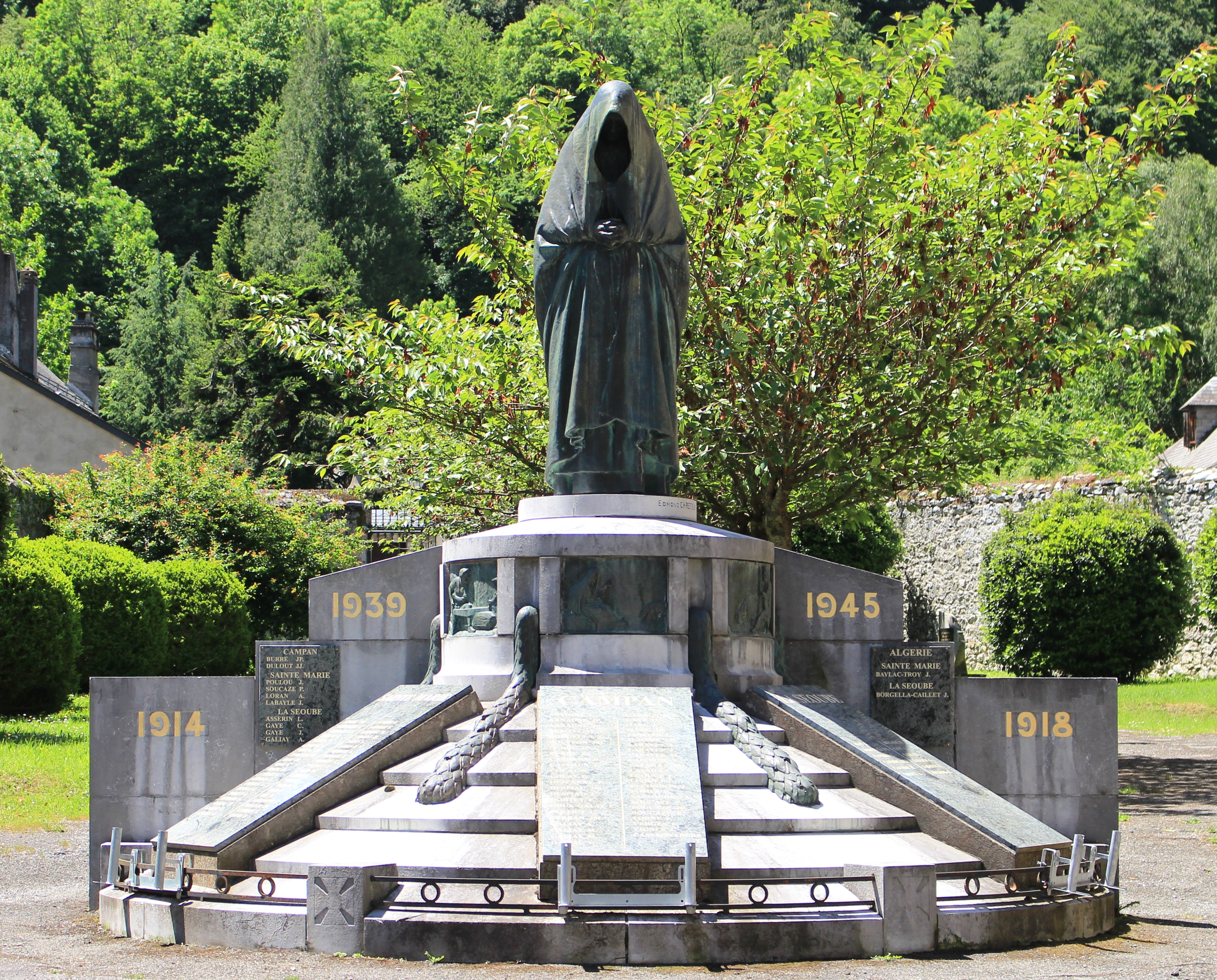
Campan

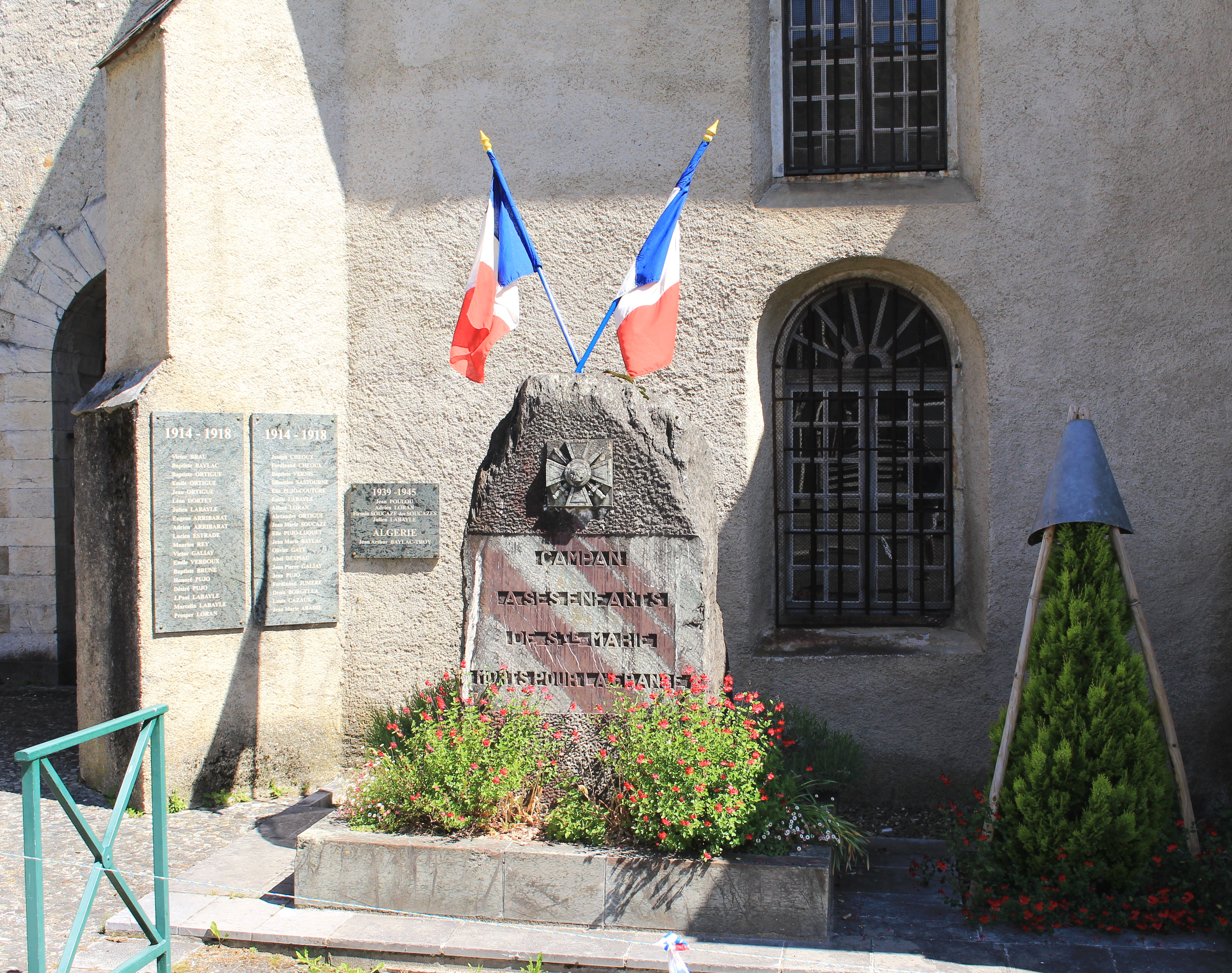
St-Marie-de-Campan

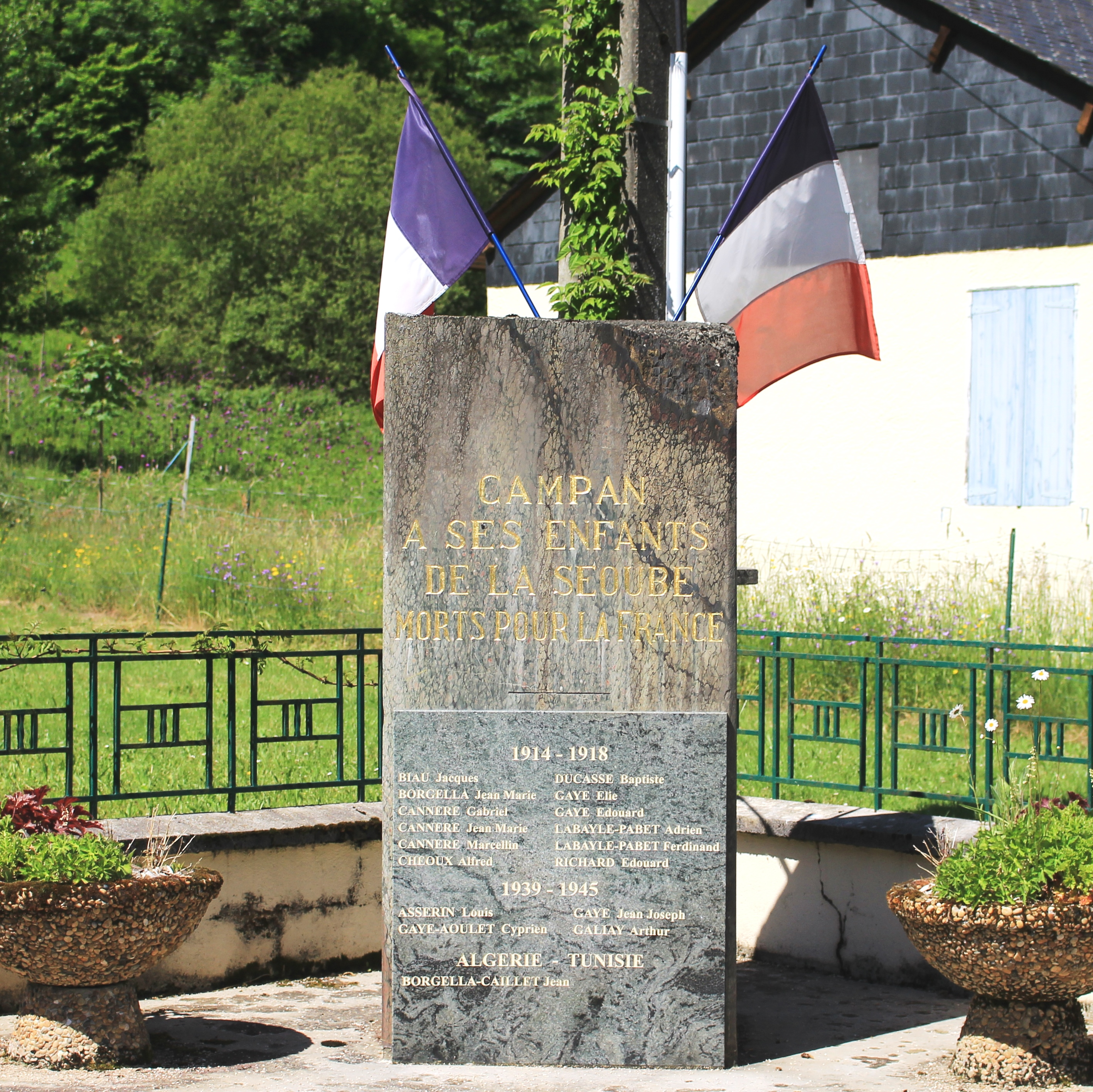
La Séoube

=== Les Mounaques of Campan ===
In the old days, when a man of the Campan valley got married in circumstances that were not normal, e.g., an old widower marrying a young girl, he was the object of a 'charivari' (i.e., pandemonium), an outbreak of very rough mockery. The couple was represented by coarse dolls, known as 'les Mounaques' (from the Occitan word 'monaca', meaning doll or puppet).

For some years, a workshop has been open in Campan manufacturing a collection of small 'mounaques'. Founded by Maryse Bouyrie and Marie-Madeleine Ortéga, initially situated at La Séoube, it has been located since 1999 at the heart of Campan, in a house provided by the municipal council, « la Clairefontaine ». In summer, displays of 'mounaques' can sometimes be seen around the town.

Mounaques in Campan

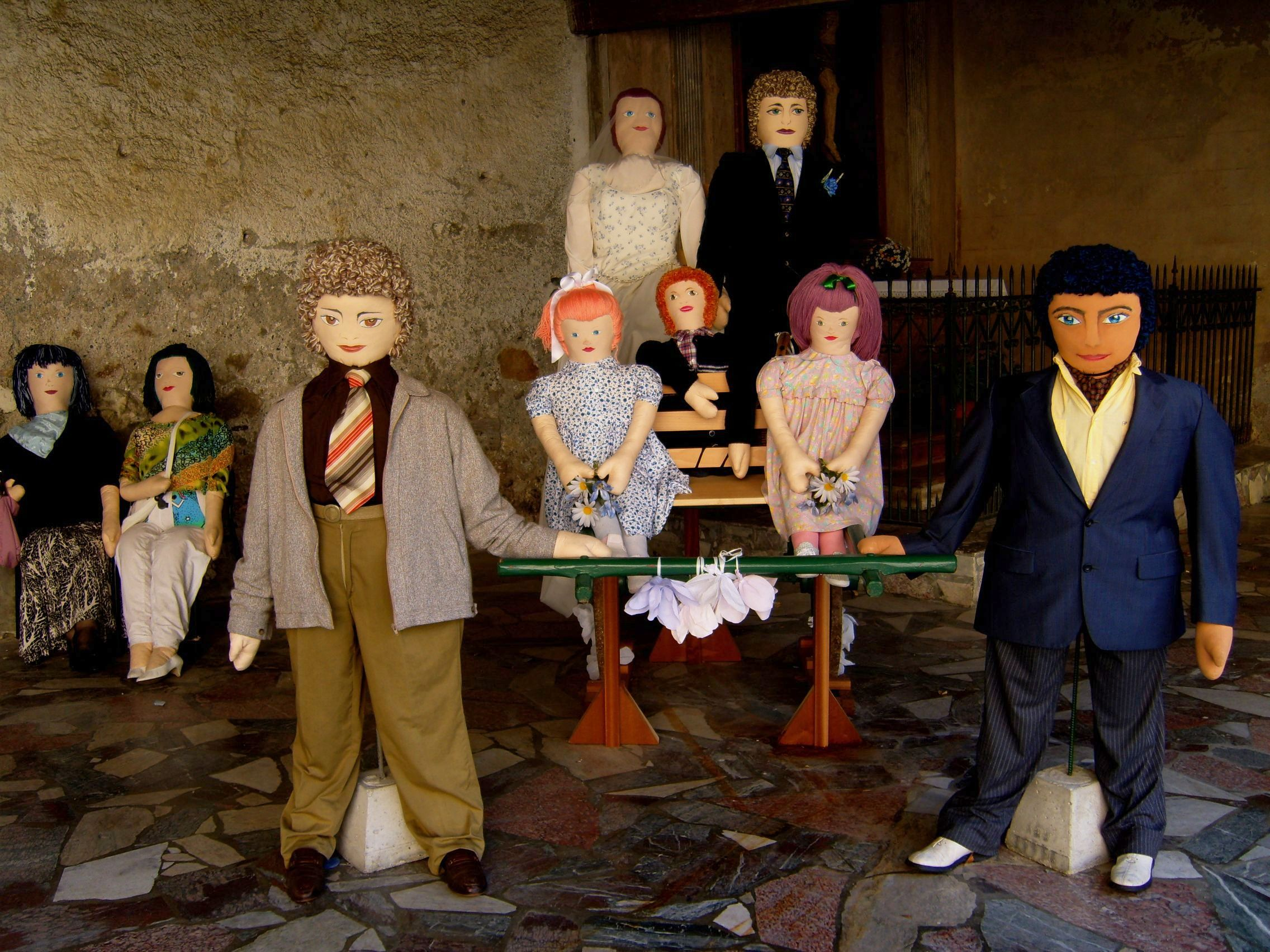

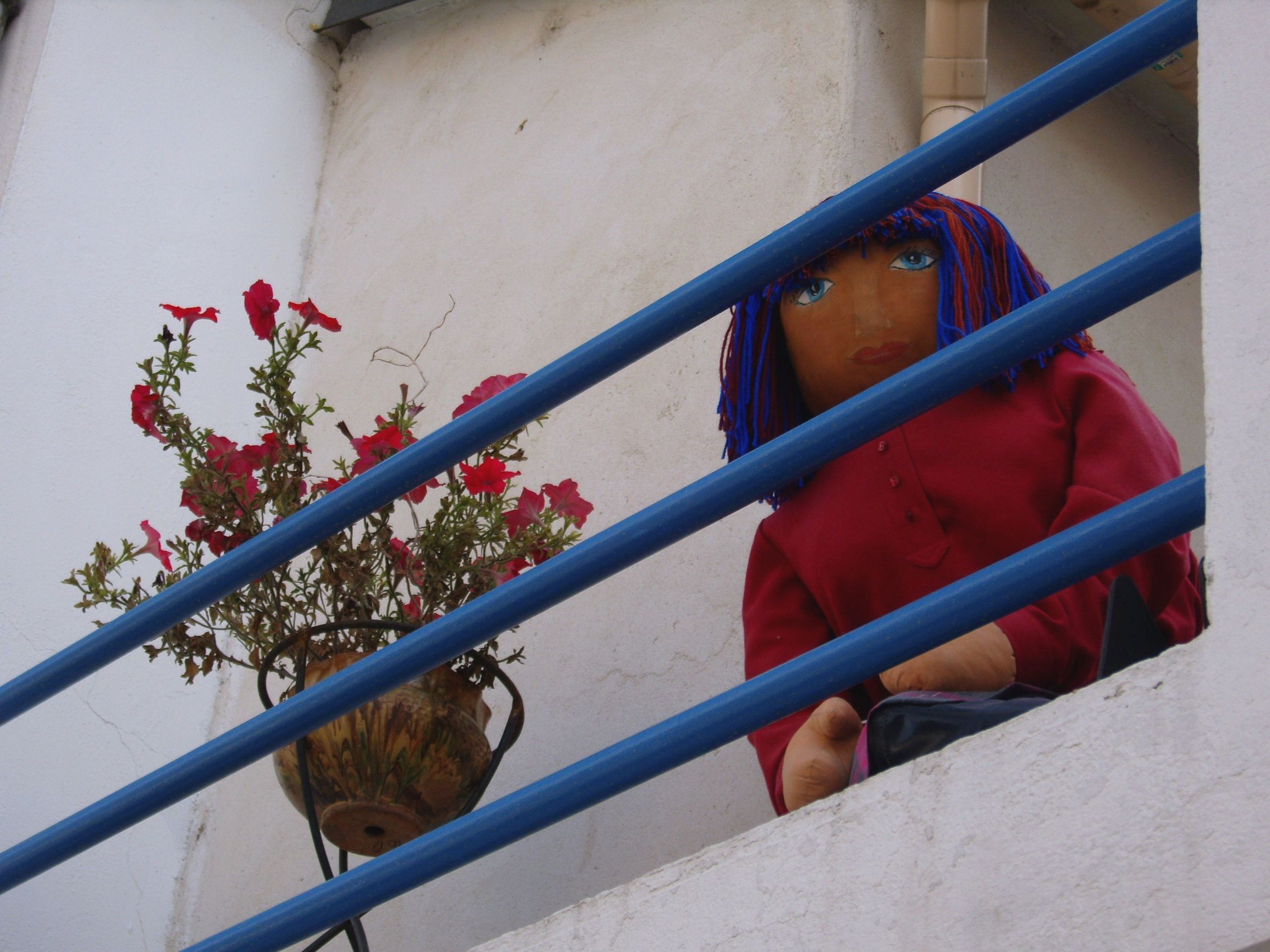

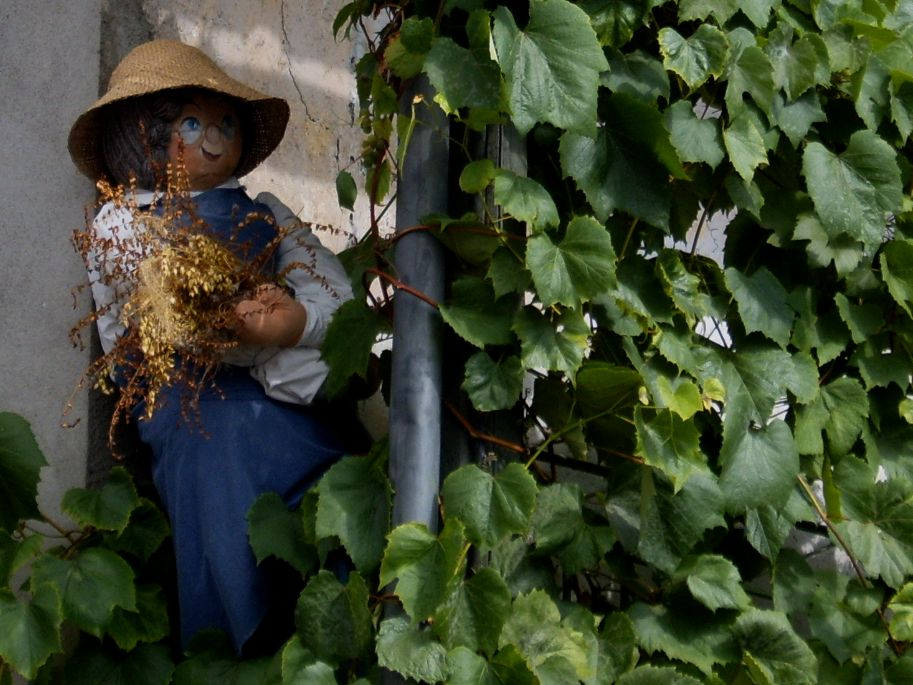

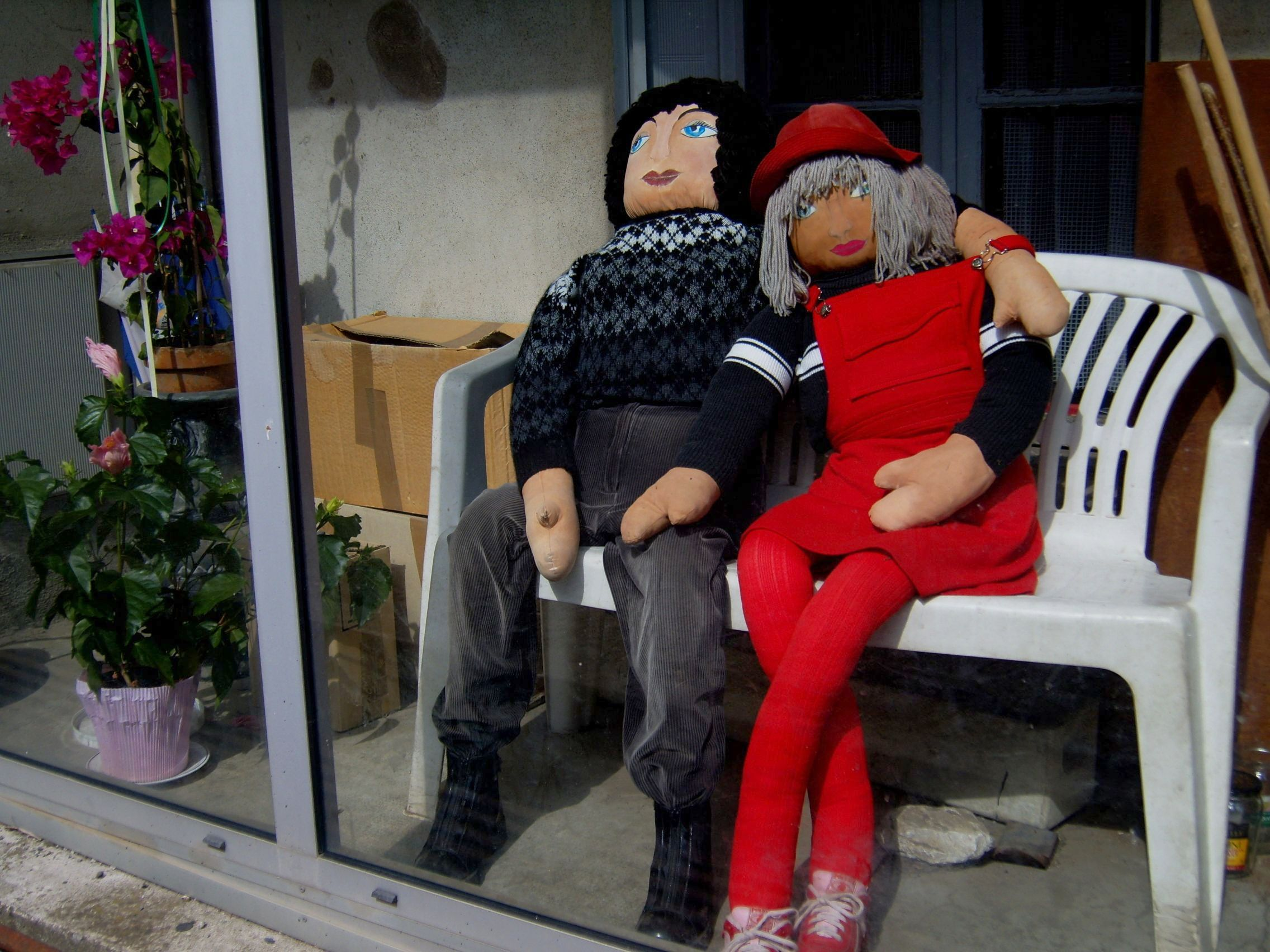

=== The Forge of Ste Marie de Campan ===
This is one of the high places of the Tour de France. The famous cyclist, Eugène Christophe, known as 'le Vieux Gaulois' (the Old Gaul), repaired the front forks of his bicycle there after they broke during the descent of the Tourmalet in the 1913 race. The rules of the race prevented him from obtaining assistance and he had to walk 15 km to do the repairs himself. This gave the leading pack an advance of four hours and Christophe's dreams of victory evaporated. A plaque recalls the event.

=== Payolle ===
The plateau of Payolle is used as a recreational location throughout the year. Common activities include skiing, hiking country trails, horse riding, fishing and go-karting down hillsides.

== The Cagots of Campan ==
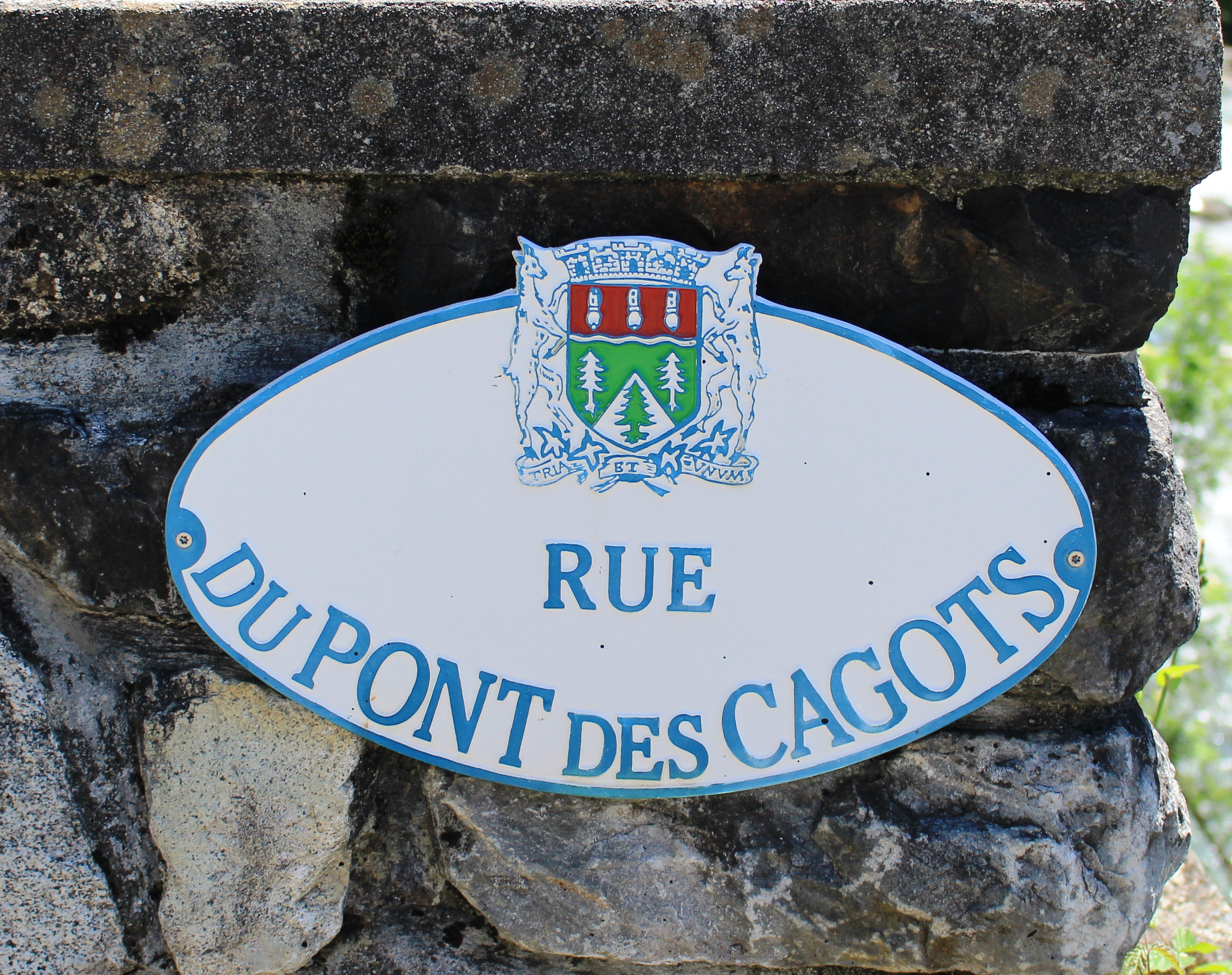
A sign for Rue du Pont des Cagots in Campan.

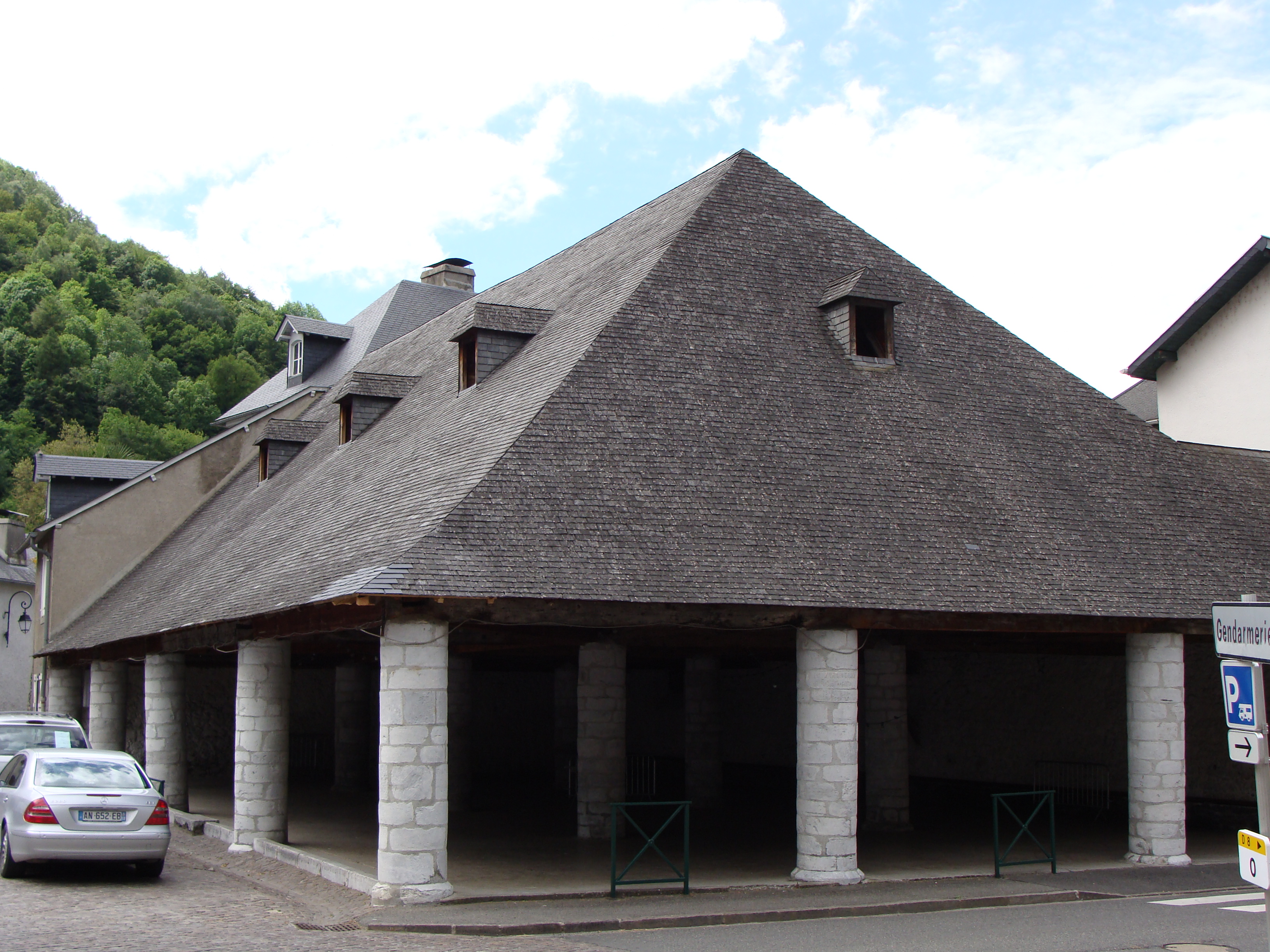
Halle de Campan which was built by the local Cagots.

Like many towns in the Pyrenees, Campan was home to a population of Cagots, socially ostracised craftspeople, who until the beginning of the 20th century were forced to live on the right bank of the Adour, separate from Campan proper. Nowadays, the bridge that connects the two shores is called the Pont des Cagots or the Pont des charpentiers. Records of the Cagots in Campan go back for more than eight centuries.

Around 1580, the Cagots had built a chapel, Saint-Sébastien, at a place called Pré de Ferrand, near the bridge. In 1597, a fire damaged the church of Campan, and the Cagots rebuilt the framework. On 19 November 1694, another violent fire destroyed the church, the hall, and 70 houses. The Cagots rebuilt the church and the Halle de Campan. Classified as a historical monument since 14 March 1927, the hall is the oldest in the Hautes-Pyrénées.

But the Cagots remained, like all Cagots, separated from the rest of the inhabitants: in the church of Saint-Jean-Baptiste, built by the Cagots, a chapel at the bottom of the nave was separated from the rest of the church, it corresponds to the space that was the Cagots were forced to stay in. This space contains a stoup reserved for Cagots, located on the right side of the old entrance porch, on the west side of the church opposite the round stoup intended for the non-Cagot population.

== Heraldry ==
Arms of Campan	Argent manteled vert, three fir trees intersecting one into the other, a chief gules charged with three bells or, collared in the field, supported by a wavy divide of the same. Devise / Cri Tria et unum. Details: The fir trees represent one of the elements that brought prosperity to the town: timber. The bells symbolize livestock farming, which relates to the valley's other resources: butter and wool. The threefold repetition of these elements represents the town's three main areas: the town center, the Sainte-Marie district, and the Séoube district. Heraldic conflict: the bells are not depicted with red collars. Official coat of arms verified with the town hall.

== The surrounding area ==
- The nearest town is Bagnères-de-Bigorre, a sub-prefecture of the Hautes-Pyrénées department and a spa town.
- The Médous caves are natural caves, with no trace of prehistoric human presence, carved by an underground river, a resurgence of the Adour.
- The Col d'Aspin (1,489 m) and the Col du Tourmalet (2,115 m) are mountain passes popular with cyclists.
- The La Mongie downhill ski resort and the Payolle-Campan cross-country ski resort are also nearby.
- The Baronnies, a natural region in the Pyrenean foothills, contains the Esparros chasm.
- The Pic du Midi de Bigorre (2,865 m) is home to a scientific observatory and is open to tourists year-round.
- The village of Nestier features the Mont-Arès Calvary (19th century) and a natural swimming pool.
- The city of Lourdes, a Marian city and center of Catholic pilgrimage.

== See also ==
- Col du Tourmalet
- Pic du Midi de Bigorre
- Communes of the Hautes-Pyrénées department

== Bibliography ==
- Jean-Jacques Agostini, Calendrier historique de Campan et son canton, Histodif, 1993, page 240. ISBN 2841260208
- Michel Grosclaude et Jean-François Le Nail, Dictionnaire toponymique des communes des Hautes Pyrénées intégrant les travaux de Jacques Boisgontier, Conseil Général des Hautes Pyrénées, 2000, page 348. ISBN 2951481012.
- Abbé Colomez, Histoire de la Province et Comté de Bigorre écrite vers 1735, Lafitte Reprints, page 285.
