= Montagnes Valdôtaines =

Regional anthem of Aosta Valley, Italy

Score of "Montagnes valdôtaines"

Montagnes valdôtaines - Orchestra

"Montagnes valdôtaines" is the official anthem of the Italian region of Aosta Valley.

== History ==
Music and lyrics were originally written by French composer Alfred Roland in 1832, and the original title of the song was "Tyrolienne des Pyrénées", or "Montagnes Pyrénées".

Lyrics were later adapted for the Aosta Valley by poet and composer Flaminie Porté, while the music was adapted by Teresio Colombotto.

It was officially recognized as the regional anthem in 2006.

== Lyrics ==
French lyrics

Montagnes valdôtaines
Vous êtes mes amours,
Hameaux, clochers, fontaines,
Vous me plairez toujours.

Rien n'est si beau que ma patrie,
Rien n'est si doux que mon amie.

Ô montagnards
Chantez en chœur de mon pays
La paix et le bonheur.

Haltelà, haltelà, haltelà
Les montagnards sont là.

English translation

Mountains of Aosta valley
ye are my beloved,
hamlets, bell towers, fountains,
I will always love you.

Nothing is more beautiful than my homeland,
nothing is sweeter than my friends.

O mountain men
sing all together of my country
the peace and the happiness

Halt, halt, halt there
The mountain men are there.
