= Lac de Caderolles =

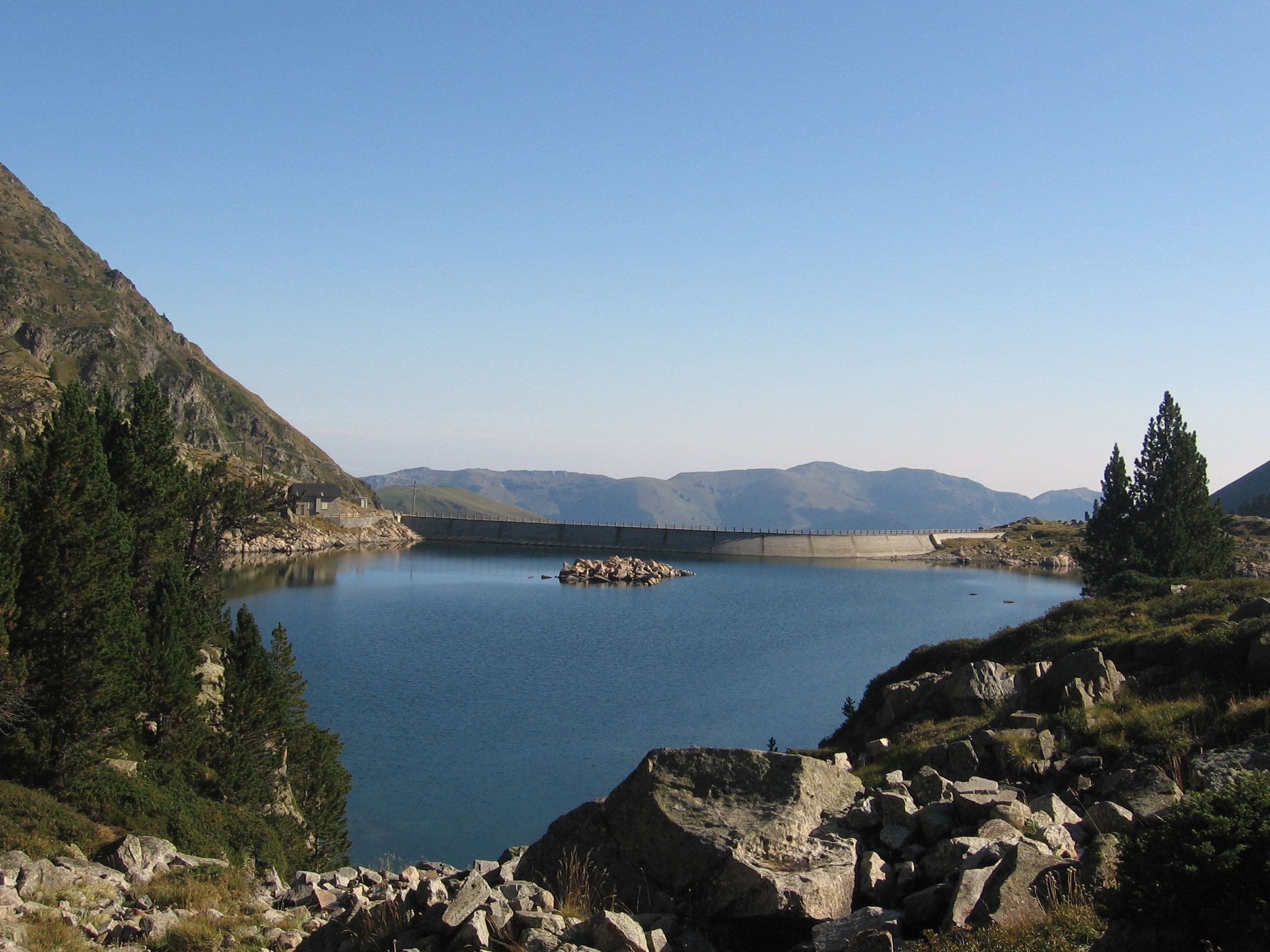

- Location within Pyrenees
- Location: Hautes-Pyrénées
- Coordinates: 42°53′43″N 0°12′19″E
- Primary outflows: Ruisseau du Garet
- Basin countries: France
- Surface area: 0.014 km^{2} (0.0054 sq mi)
- Max. depth: 6 m (20 ft)
- Surface elevation: 1,988 m (6,522 ft)

Lac de Caderolles (also known as Lac de la Mane) is a lake near Bagnères-de-Bigorre in Hautes-Pyrénées, France. At an elevation of 1988 m, its surface area is 0.014 km^{2}.
