= Beaudéan =

- Commune
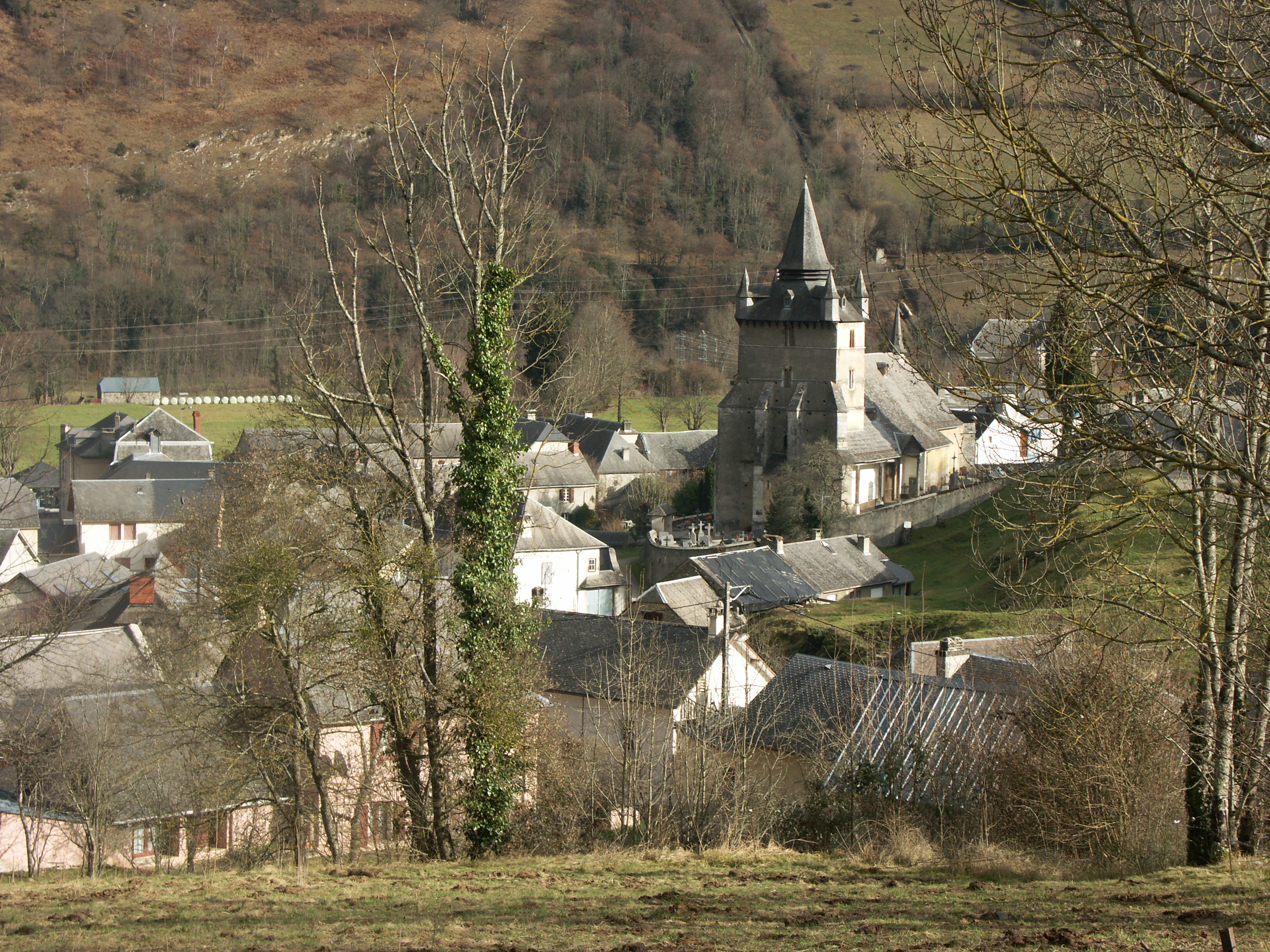
- Beaudéan and the church of Saint-Martin

- Coat of arms
- Location of Beaudéan
- Location within France Location within Occitanie
- Coordinates: 43°01′45″N 0°10′10″E
- Country: France
- Region: Occitania
- Department: Hautes-Pyrénées
- Arrondissement: Bagnères-de-Bigorre
- Canton: La Haute-Bigorre
- Intercommunality: Haute-Bigorre

Government
  - Mayor (2020–2026): Yves Laffaille
- Area^{1}: 16.7 km^{2} (6.4 sq mi)
- Elevation: 650 m (2,130 ft)
- Highest elevation: 2,262 m (7,421 ft)
- Lowest elevation: 611 m (2,005 ft)
- Population (2023): 383
  - Density: 22.9/km^{2} (59.4/sq mi)
- Time zone: UTC+01:00 (CET)
  - Summer (DST): UTC+02:00 (CEST)
- INSEE/Postal code: 65078 /65710
- ^{1} French Land Register data, which excludes lakes, ponds, glaciers > 1 km^{2} (0.386 sq mi or 247 acres) and river estuaries.

Beaudéan (French pronunciation: [bodeɑ̃]; Occitan: Beudian) is a commune in the Hautes-Pyrénées department in the Occitanie region of south-western France.

The inhabitants of the commune are known as Beaudéannais or Beaudéannaises.

== Geography ==
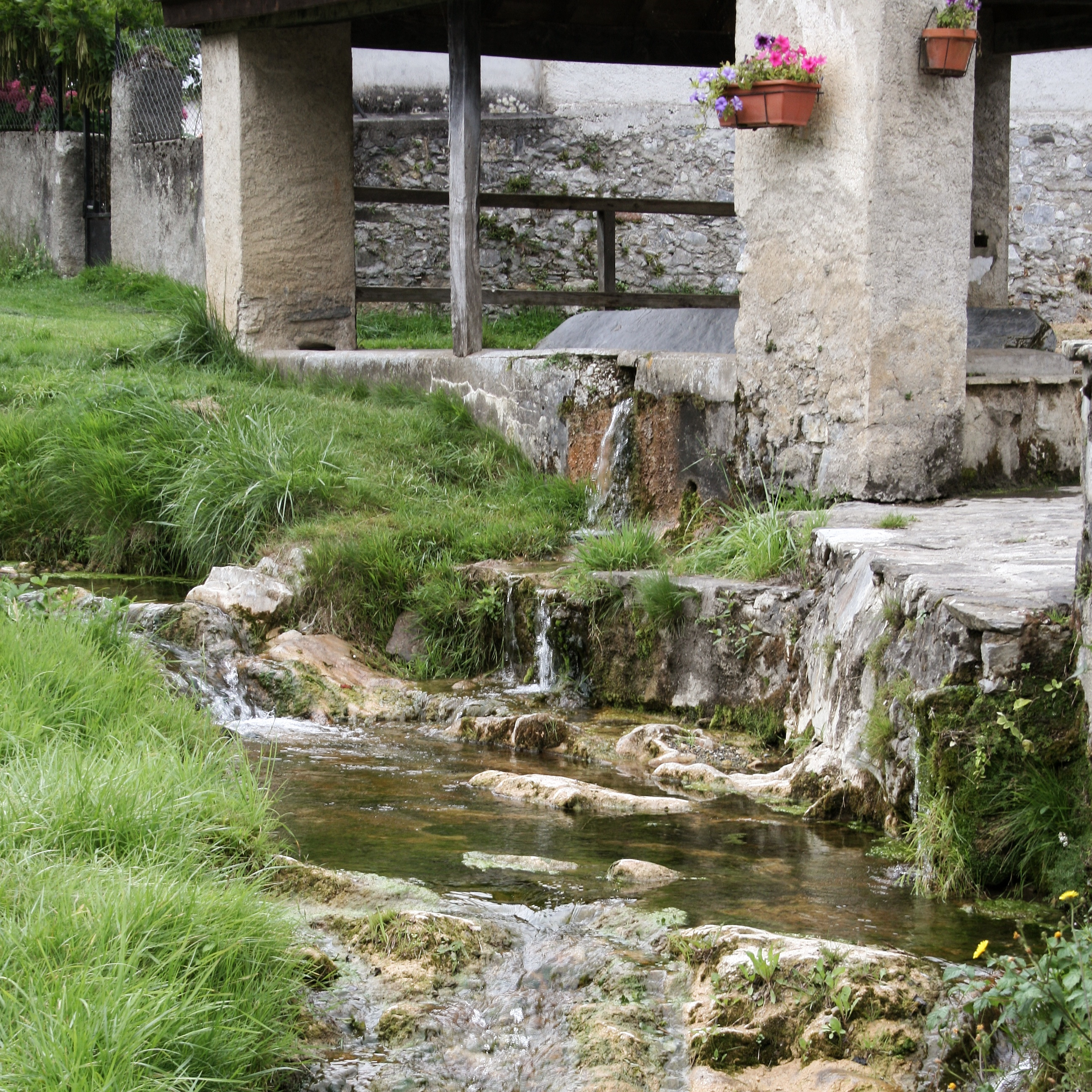
The Lavoir (Public laundry)

Beaudean is located at the mouth of the Lesponne valley and the Campan valley in the inter-communal cooperative of Haute-Bigorre some 20 km south by south-east of Tarbes and 5 km south of Bagnères-de-Bigorre. Access to the commune is by the D935 road from Pouzac in the north which passes through the eastern tip of the commune and the village and continues south-east to Campan. The D29 branches off the D935 in the commune and goes along the length of the commune south-west to end in Chiroulet. Apart from the village there is the hamlet of Serris. The commune is mixed forest and farmland in the north and rugged forested mountains in the south.

The Adour river forms the north-eastern border of the commune as it flows north-west eventually joining the Atlantic Ocean at Boucau. The Adour de Lesponne flows from the south-west of the commune, forming much of the western border as it flows north-east, gathering tributaries such as the Ruisseau du Brouilh (which forms the southern border of the commune), the Ruisseau de Narbios, the Hourquet, and the Ruisseau de Hount Hérède, to join the Adour at the eastern corner of the commune. The Serris river flows north-east through the commune and the village to join the Adour. The Ruisseau de Binaros forms most of the eastern border of the commune as it flows north to join the Adour de Lesponne in the narrow "neck" of the commune.

== Toponymy ==
Historical names:

- In Beldeyano, Latin (c. 1090, Larcher, Cartulary of Saint-Pé).
- Arnaldus de Beudean, Latin and Gascon (1283, Procès Bigorre).
- Beudeaa, (1285, Montre Bigorre).
- apud Beudeanum, Latin (1300, Enquête Bigorre).
- De Baudeano, Latin (1313 Debita regi Navarre; 1342, Pouillé of Tarbes).
- de Veudeano, Latin (1379 Procuration of Tarbes).
- Beudean (1429, Censier of Bigorre).
- Baudean, (1760, Larcher, Pouillé of Tarbes).

Beaudéan appears as Beaudean on the 1750 Cassini Map and the same on the 1790 version.

Beaudéan comes from the name of a domain. The Germanic personal name Bald-win (Latinised as Baldinus) with the suffix -anum.

=== Heraldry ===
Arms of Beaudéan	Blazon: Quarterly, 1 and 3 Or, a fir tree Vert; 2 and 4 Argent, a helm Gules in profile sinister between 2 bears standing and confronting of Sable.

== Administration ==
List of Successive Mayors

From	To	Name	Party
1989	2020	Jacques Brune	PRG
2020	2026	Yves Laffaille	

=== Judicial and administrative proceedings ===
Beaudéan falls within the area of the Tribunal d'instance (District court) of Tarbes, the Tribunal de grande instance (High Court) of Tarbes, the Cour d'appel Court of Appeal of Pau, the Tribunal pour enfants (Juvenile court) of Tarbes, the Conseil de prud'hommes (Labour Court) of Tarbes, the Tribunal de commerce (Commercial Court) of Tarbes, the Tribunal administratif (Administrative tribunal) of Pau, and the Cour administrative d'appel (Administrative Court of Appeal) of Bordeaux

== Demography ==
Historical population

Year	Pop.	±% p.a.
1793	723	—
1800	713	−0.20%
1806	810	+2.15%
1821	763	−0.40%
1831	865	+1.26%
1836	972	+2.36%
1841	1,000	+0.57%
1846	998	−0.04%
1851	976	−0.44%
1856	894	−1.74%
1861	875	−0.43%
1866	895	+0.45%
1872	894	−0.02%
1876	853	−1.17%
1881	780	−1.77%
1886	766	−0.36%
1891	703	−1.70%
1896	731	+0.78%

Year	Pop.	±% p.a.
1901	728	−0.08%
1906	688	−1.12%
1911	634	−1.62%
1921	524	−1.89%
1926	505	−0.74%
1931	552	+1.80%
1936	505	−1.76%
1946	485	−0.40%
1954	474	−0.29%
1962	453	−0.56%
1968	472	+0.69%
1975	378	−3.12%
1982	354	−0.93%
1990	410	+1.85%
1999	378	−0.90%
2007	391	+0.42%
2012	391	+0.00%
2017	395	+0.20%

Source: EHESS and INSEE

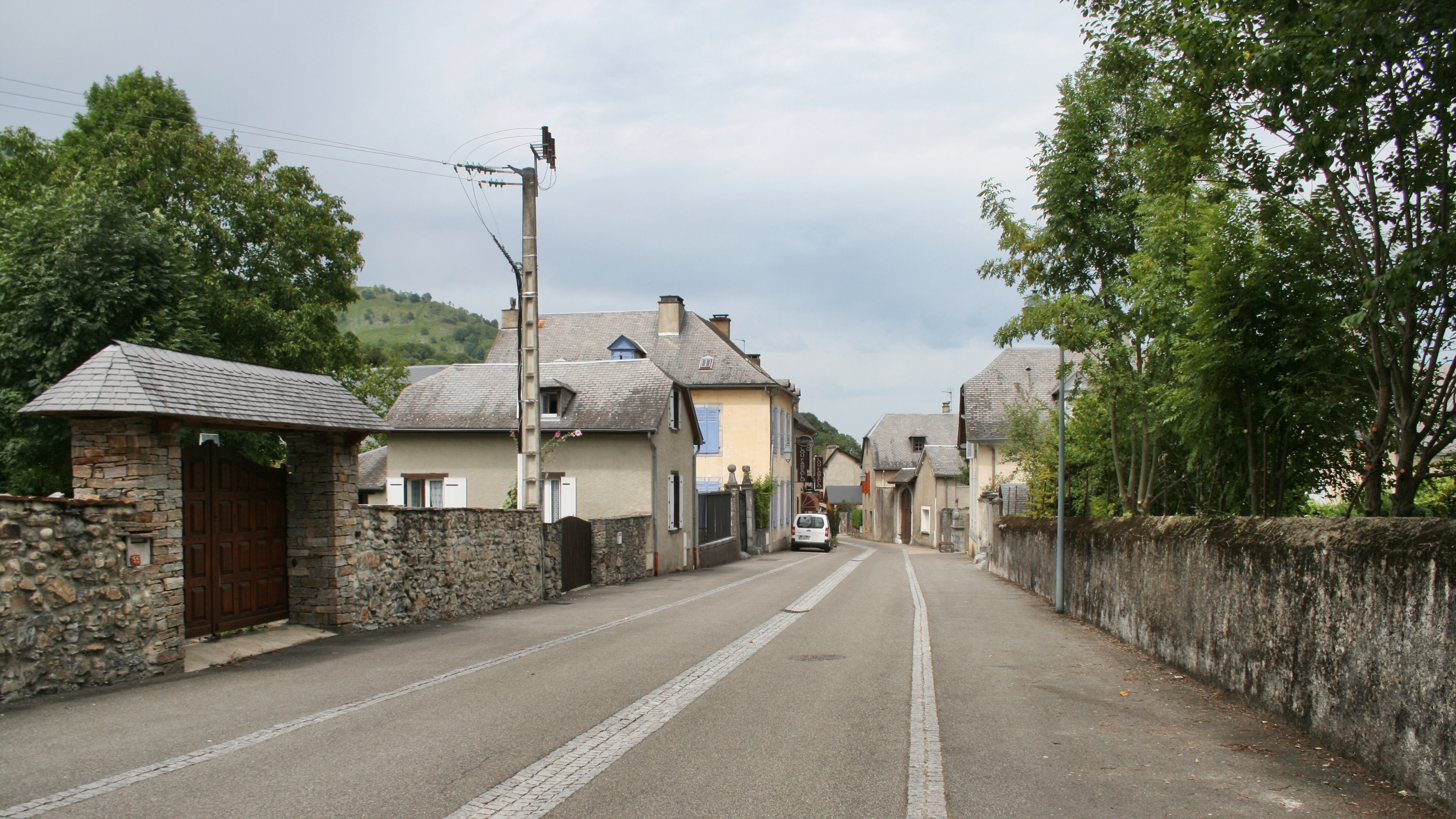
The main street

== Culture and heritage ==
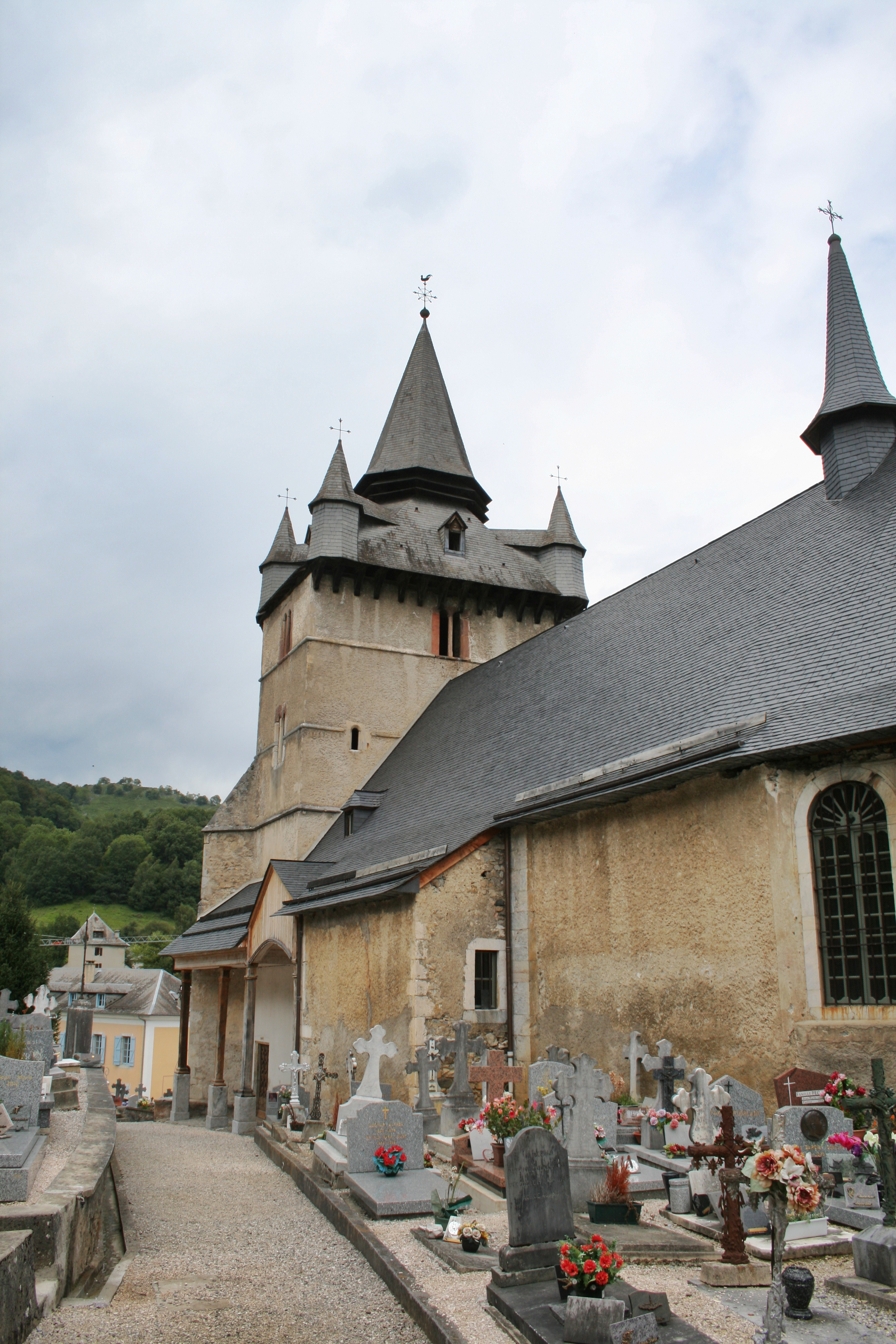
The Church of Saint Martin

=== Civil heritage ===
- A Museum in the house where Dominique Jean Larrey, was born traces the history of military surgery.

=== Religious heritage ===
The Church of Saint Martin (15th century) is registered as an historical monument. is It is characterized by a bell tower with four corbelled turrets. The Church contains several items that are registered as historical objects:

- A Hilarri (18th century)
- A Retable and Tabernacle (18th century)
- 2 Candlesticks (18th century)
- The Choir enclosure (18th century)

== Notable people linked to the commune ==
- Dominique Jean Larrey (1766-1842), a French surgeon in Napoleon's army, was born in the village.

== See also ==
- Communes of the Hautes-Pyrénées department
