= Astugue =

- Commune
- Coat of arms
- Location of Astugue
- Location within France Location within Occitanie
- Coordinates: 43°05′37″N 0°04′20″E
- Country: France
- Region: Occitania
- Department: Hautes-Pyrénées
- Arrondissement: Bagnères-de-Bigorre
- Canton: La Haute-Bigorre
- Intercommunality: CC Haute-Bigorre

Government
  - Mayor (2020–2026): Serge Marquerie
- Area^{1}: 7.96 km^{2} (3.07 sq mi)
- Elevation: 650 m (2,130 ft)
- Highest elevation: 733 m (2,405 ft)
- Lowest elevation: 391 m (1,283 ft)
- Population (2023): 263
  - Density: 33.0/km^{2} (85.6/sq mi)
- Time zone: UTC+01:00 (CET)
  - Summer (DST): UTC+02:00 (CEST)
- INSEE/Postal code: 65043 /65200
- ^{1} French Land Register data, which excludes lakes, ponds, glaciers > 1 km^{2} (0.386 sq mi or 247 acres) and river estuaries.

Astugue (French pronunciation: [astyɡ]; Occitan: Astuga) is a commune in the Hautes-Pyrénées department in southwestern France.

== Population ==
Historical population
| Year | Pop. | ±% p.a. |
|---|---|---|
| 1968 | 225 | — |
| 1975 | 185 | −2.76% |
| 1982 | 171 | −1.12% |
| 1990 | 204 | +2.23% |
| 1999 | 219 | +0.79% |
| 2007 | 310 | +4.44% |
| 2012 | 280 | −2.02% |
| 2017 | 258 | −1.62% |
| 2023 | 263 | +0.32% |
Source: INSEE

== See also ==
- Communes of the Hautes-Pyrénées department
