= Tony Poncet =

French opera singer

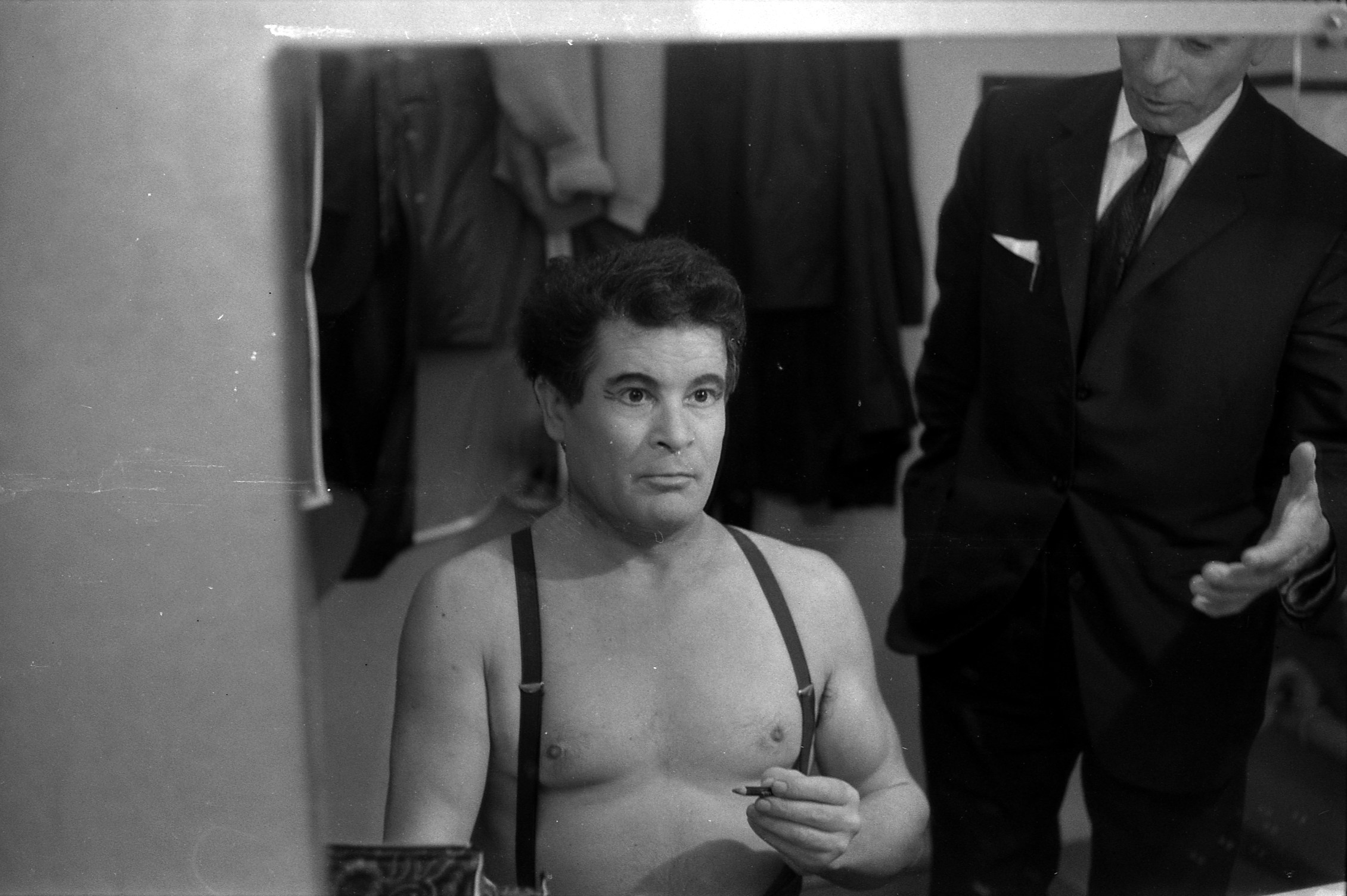

Tony Poncet (23 December 1918 – 13 November 1979) was a Spanish-born, French-raised opera tenor. The peak of his career spanned the 1956-to-1966 period, during which time he made a number of recordings and enjoyed a nationwide reputation as an exciting exponent of dramatic roles in the French and Italian operatic repertoires.

== Career ==
Born Antonio Poncé Miron in María, Spain, he came to France with his financially strapped family in 1922 and settled in Bagnères-de-Bigorre. He left school at 13, did manual work and found labouring jobs but, more importantly, began singing as an amateur in 1933 in a travelling choir called Les chanteurs montagnards d'Alfred Roland.

Poncet served with the French army in World War Two, was captured by the Germans and imprisoned. Following his liberation by American forces he returned to France and was awarded a military veterans' scholarship in 1947 to study voice at the Paris Conservatory. At the conservatory, he received lessons from Fernand Francell, Gabriel Dubois and Louise Vuillermoz.

He won first prize in the dramatic tenor category at a singing competition held in Cannes in 1954 and embarked on a concert tour that took him to the United States, Mexico and Canada. Upon his return, he was engaged to sing at several provincial opera theatres in France (Lyon, Avignon, Toulouse and so on), but it was in Belgium that he scored his first big successes, notably at Liège, Ghent and Brussels.

Poncet made his debuts at both the Opéra-Comique and the Palais Garnier in Paris in 1957. He specialised in the demanding lead tenor roles of such 19th-century French grand operas as La Juive, Les Huguenots, La favorite, L'Africaine, Faust and Hérodiade. In these particular works, his excitingly powerful and ringing high notes could be exhibited to great advantage. He was also admired in a number of Italian operatic works, including Il trovatore, Aida, Cavalleria rusticana and Pagliacci.

His voice declined somewhat in power and his career therefore began to falter in the mid-1960s and he returned to the provincial circuit. In 1969, however, he re-emerged on the world scene, undertaking the role of Raoul in a concert version of Les Huguenots at Carnegie Hall, opposite soprano Beverly Sills; but by now his singing was in obvious decline, and the New York music critics proved hostile. His last performance occurred in Toulouse in 1974.

Poncet was one of the few post-war French tenors capable of singing heroic roles in a manner at all reminiscent of the great Gallic spinto tenors and dramatic tenors of previous generations—the likes of Gilbert-Louis Duprez, Jean-Alexandre Talazac, Agustarello Affre, Léon Escalaïs, Charles Dalmorès, Paul Franz, César Vezzani, Georges Thill and José Luccioni (not to mention the Francophone Pole Jean de Reszke and the Francophone Belgian Fernand Ansseau). Of small stature and blessed with limited acting skills, the steely power of Poncet's voice—coupled with his impressive upper register (which ascended to the high D in his prime)—made up to a certain extent for his lack of stage credibility.

Poncet died of cancer in Libourne, Aquitaine, at the age of 60. His voice may be heard on recordings, a few of which have been reissued on CD. His daughter, Mathilde Poncé, has written a biography of her father entitled Tony Poncet: Tenor de l'Opera (Editions L'Hamattan, 2009), from which some of the information included in this entry has been drawn.

== Sources ==
- Le guide de l'opéra, Roland Mancini and Jean-Jacques Rouveroux, Fayard, 1986.
