= Asté =

- Commune
- Coat of arms
- Location of Asté
- Location within France Location within Occitanie
- Coordinates: 43°02′31″N 0°10′08″E
- Country: France
- Region: Occitania
- Department: Hautes-Pyrénées
- Arrondissement: Bagnères-de-Bigorre
- Canton: La Haute-Bigorre
- Intercommunality: CC Haute-Bigorre

Government
  - Mayor (2020–2026): Thierry Broca
- Area^{1}: 26.67 km^{2} (10.30 sq mi)
- Elevation: 600 m (2,000 ft)
- Highest elevation: 1,804 m (5,919 ft)
- Lowest elevation: 578 m (1,896 ft)
- Population (2023): 568
  - Density: 21.3/km^{2} (55.2/sq mi)
- Time zone: UTC+01:00 (CET)
  - Summer (DST): UTC+02:00 (CEST)
- INSEE/Postal code: 65042 /65200
- ^{1} French Land Register data, which excludes lakes, ponds, glaciers > 1 km^{2} (0.386 sq mi or 247 acres) and river estuaries.

Asté (French pronunciation: [aste]; Occitan: Astèr) is a commune in the Hautes-Pyrénées department, France.

== Population ==
Historical population
Year	Pop.	±% p.a.
1968	563	—
1975	513	−1.32%
1982	504	−0.25%
1990	456	−1.24%
1999	484	+0.66%
2007	525	+1.02%
2012	537	+0.45%
2017	559	+0.81%
2023	568	+0.27%
Source: INSEE

== See also ==
- Communes of the Hautes-Pyrénées department
