= Antist =

- Commune
- Coat of arms
- Location of Antist
- Location within France Location within Occitanie
- Coordinates: 43°07′07″N 0°07′42″E
- Country: France
- Region: Occitania
- Department: Hautes-Pyrénées
- Arrondissement: Bagnères-de-Bigorre
- Canton: La Haute-Bigorre
- Intercommunality: Haute-Bigorre

Government
  - Mayor (2020–2026): Florent Anglade
- Area^{1}: 2.43 km^{2} (0.94 sq mi)
- Elevation: 550 m (1,800 ft)
- Highest elevation: 576 m (1,890 ft)
- Lowest elevation: 434 m (1,424 ft)
- Population (2023): 189
  - Density: 77.8/km^{2} (201/sq mi)
- Time zone: UTC+01:00 (CET)
  - Summer (DST): UTC+02:00 (CEST)
- INSEE/Postal code: 65016 /65200
- ^{1} French Land Register data, which excludes lakes, ponds, glaciers > 1 km^{2} (0.386 sq mi or 247 acres) and river estuaries.

Antist is a commune in the Hautes-Pyrénées department in southwestern France.

== Population ==
Historical population
Year	Pop.	±% p.a.
1968	91	—
1975	88	−0.48%
1982	99	+1.70%
1990	111	+1.44%
1999	106	−0.51%
2007	132	+2.78%
2012	140	+1.18%
2017	181	+5.27%
2023	189	+0.72%
Source: INSEE

== See also ==
- Communes of the Hautes-Pyrénées department
