= Julián Bourdeu =

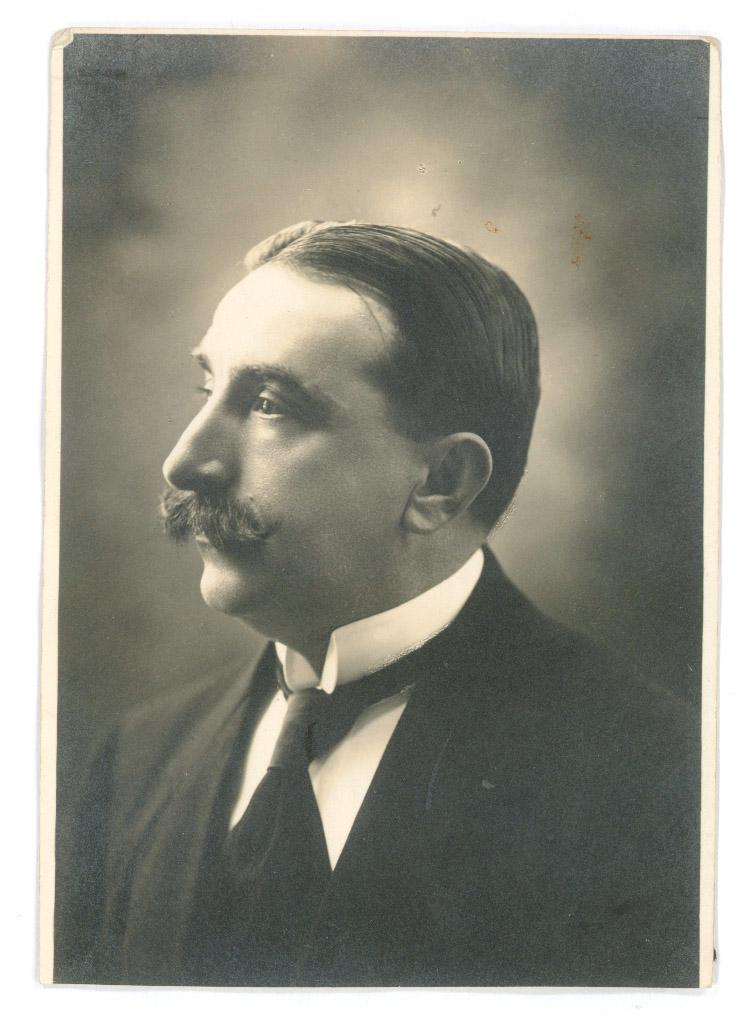
Julián Bourdeu around 1910

Julián Bourdeu (Bagnères-de-Bigorre, France, 1870 - Buenos Aires, Argentina, 1932) was an active neighbour of the city of Buenos Aires promoter of progress and culture, a pioneer of the Villa Crespo quarter where he was the founder of various institutions. He was also active in other quarters of the city (such as Villa Talar). Judge of the Peace, journalist and a Police Commissioner.

Bourdeu arrived in Buenos Aires in 1888 and was the first Chief Accountant of the Fábrica Nacional de Calzado (National Shoe Factory). The establishing of the factory in that year led to the creation of Villa Crespo (initially called "San Bernardo"), one of the pioneer towns in Buenos Aires. Bourdeu therefore became one of the pioneers in that zone. The following year Bourdeu was Justice of the Peace, and the founder or co-founder of many institutions, the newspaper"El Progreso" (1895), Biblioteca Popular de San Bernardo (San Bernardo Public Library, 1910, presently "Biblioteca Popular Alberdi") and the first director or president of many others. Prior to the 1904 presidential elections, Julian Bourdeu was elected as a member of the college that voted Manuel Quintana as President of the Republic and elected national senators for the capital, the Argentine electoral system at the time being indirect.

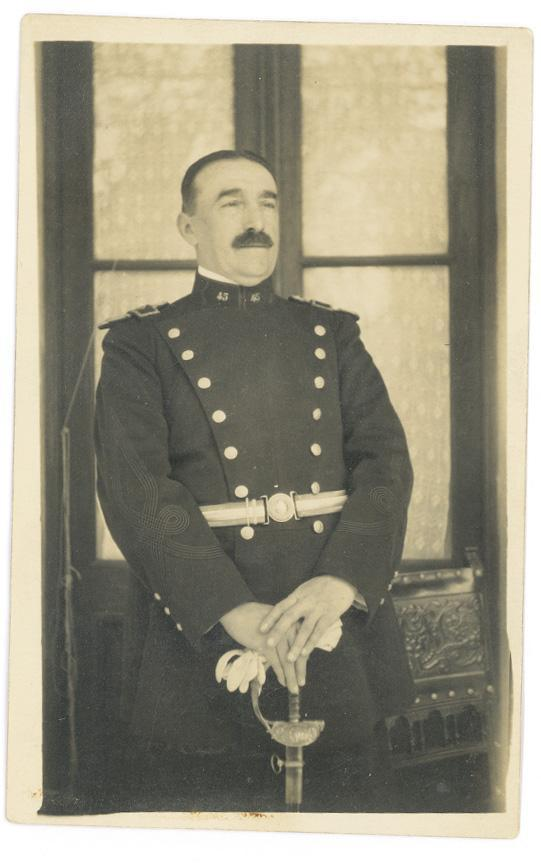
Bourdeu in uniform of Policía de la Capital Commissary

In 1904, an act was passed in order to improve the relations between the law enforcement authorities and the community and, as a consequence, a number of notable citizens were asked to join the ranks of the Police. Bourdeu was appointed Commissary of the Capital Police (in the city of Buenos Aires), a force that, in 1947, became the Policía Federal Argentina. Simultaneously with his police role he took significant and constant action in all areas related to community culture and development in many neighbourhoods of the city of Buenos Aires.

Julien Bourdeu died in Buenos Aires in February 1932.
