= Conservatoire botanique Pyrénéen =

Botanical conservatory in Midi-Pyrénées, France

Coordinates: 43.0517°N 0.1464°E

The Conservatoire botanique Pyrénéen, also known as the Conservatoire botanique national Midi-Pyrénées, is a botanical conservatory specializing in flora of the Pyrenees. It is located in the Vallon de Salut, BP315, Bagnères-de-Bigorre, Hautes-Pyrénées, Midi-Pyrénées, France, and open to the public Friday afternoons in the warmer months.

The conservatory was established in 1999 to preserve the endemic plant species of the Pyrenees. It is primarily a research establishment but also contains the herbarium collections of Louis Ramond de Carbonnières, Pierrine Gaston-Sacaze, Pierre Le Brun, and Georges Bosc, totalling some 30,000 specimens.

== See also ==
- List of botanical gardens in France
