= Neuilh =

- Commune
- Coat of arms
- Location of Neuilh
- Location within France Location within Occitanie
- Coordinates: 43°04′41″N 0°04′25″E
- Country: France
- Region: Occitania
- Department: Hautes-Pyrénées
- Arrondissement: Bagnères-de-Bigorre
- Canton: La Haute-Bigorre
- Intercommunality: CC de la Haute-Bigorre

Government
  - Mayor (2023–2026): Walter Redoules
- Area^{1}: 2.39 km^{2} (0.92 sq mi)
- Elevation: 689 m (2,260 ft)
- Highest elevation: 860 m (2,820 ft)
- Lowest elevation: 474 m (1,555 ft)
- Population (2023): 93
  - Density: 39/km^{2} (100/sq mi)
- Time zone: UTC+01:00 (CET)
  - Summer (DST): UTC+02:00 (CEST)
- INSEE/Postal code: 65328 /65200
- ^{1} French Land Register data, which excludes lakes, ponds, glaciers > 1 km^{2} (0.386 sq mi or 247 acres) and river estuaries.

Neuilh (French pronunciation: [nœj]; Occitan: Nulh) is a commune in the Hautes-Pyrénées department in south-western France.

== See also ==
- Communes of the Hautes-Pyrénées department
