= Canton of La Haute-Bigorre =

Coordinates: 43.07°N 0.15°E

The canton of La Haute-Bigorre is an administrative division of the Hautes-Pyrénées department, southwestern France. It was created at the French canton reorganisation which came into effect in March 2015. Its seat is in Bagnères-de-Bigorre.

It consists of the following communes:

1. Antist
2. Asté
3. Astugue
4. Bagnères-de-Bigorre
5. Beaudéan
6. Campan
7. Gerde
8. Hiis
9. Labassère
10. Montgaillard
11. Neuilh
12. Ordizan
13. Pouzac
14. Trébons
