= Montgaillard, Hautes-Pyrénées =

Montgaillard
- Commune
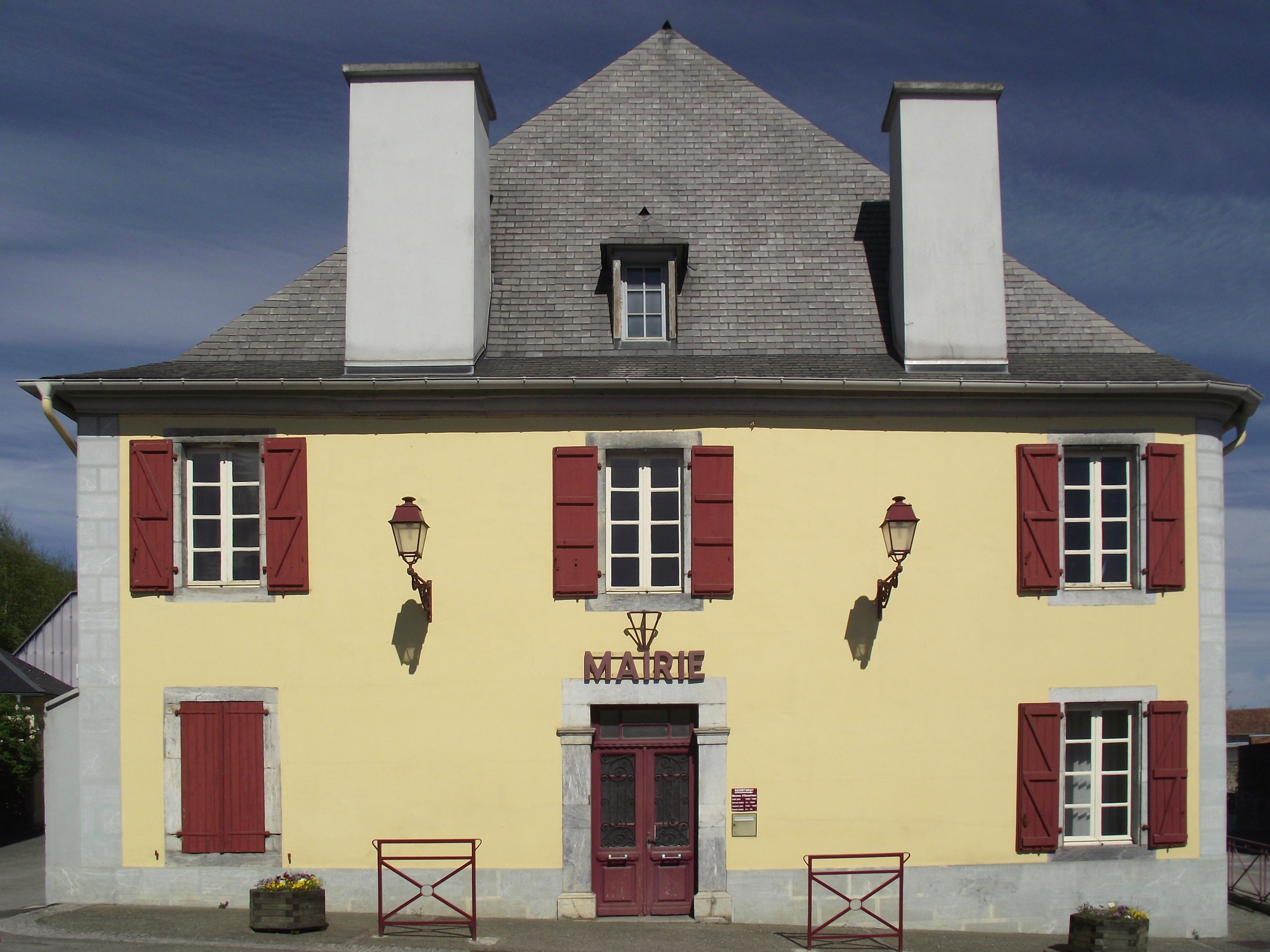
- The town hall

- Coat of arms
- Location of Montgaillard
- Location within France Location within Occitanie
- Coordinates: 43°07′32″N 0°06′32″E
- Country: France
- Region: Occitania
- Department: Hautes-Pyrénées
- Arrondissement: Bagnères-de-Bigorre
- Canton: La Haute-Bigorre
- Intercommunality: CC de la Haute-Bigorre

Government
  - Mayor (2020–2026): Dominique Pujol
- Area^{1}: 9.64 km^{2} (3.72 sq mi)
- Elevation: 430 m (1,410 ft)
- Highest elevation: 602 m (1,975 ft)
- Lowest elevation: 419 m (1,375 ft)
- Population (2023): 816
  - Density: 84.6/km^{2} (219/sq mi)
- Time zone: UTC+01:00 (CET)
  - Summer (DST): UTC+02:00 (CEST)
- INSEE/Postal code: 65320 /65200
- ^{1} French Land Register data, which excludes lakes, ponds, glaciers > 1 km^{2} (0.386 sq mi or 247 acres) and river estuaries.

Montgaillard (French pronunciation: [mɔ̃ɡajaʁ]; Occitan: Montgalhard) is a commune in the Hautes-Pyrénées department in south-western France.

== See also ==
- Communes of the Hautes-Pyrénées department
