= Gerde, Hautes-Pyrénées =

Gerde
- Commune
- Coat of arms
- Location of Gerde
- Location within France Location within Occitanie
- Coordinates: 43°03′21″N 0°10′05″E
- Country: France
- Region: Occitania
- Department: Hautes-Pyrénées
- Arrondissement: Bagnères-de-Bigorre
- Canton: La Haute-Bigorre
- Intercommunality: Haute-Bigorre

Government
  - Mayor (2020–2026): Gisèle Dubarry
- Area^{1}: 6.93 km^{2} (2.68 sq mi)
- Elevation: 568 m (1,864 ft)
- Highest elevation: 1,033 m (3,389 ft)
- Lowest elevation: 550 m (1,800 ft)
- Population (2023): 1,196
  - Density: 173/km^{2} (447/sq mi)
- Time zone: UTC+01:00 (CET)
  - Summer (DST): UTC+02:00 (CEST)
- INSEE/Postal code: 65198 /65200
- ^{1} French Land Register data, which excludes lakes, ponds, glaciers > 1 km^{2} (0.386 sq mi or 247 acres) and river estuaries.

Gerde (French pronunciation: [ʒɛʁd]; Occitan: Gerda) is a commune in the Hautes-Pyrénées department in south-western France.

== See also ==
- Communes of the Hautes-Pyrénées department
