= Alfred Hector Roland =

French composer and poet

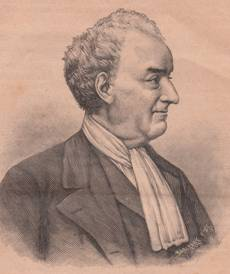

Background information
- Born: 1797
- Died: 13 March 1874 (aged 76–77)
- Occupations: Composer, Poet

Alfred Hector Roland (22 January 1797, Paris — 13 March 1874, Grenoble) was a French composer, poet and founder of the Conservatory of Music of Bagnères-de-Bigorre in South Western France.
