= Pouzac =

- Commune
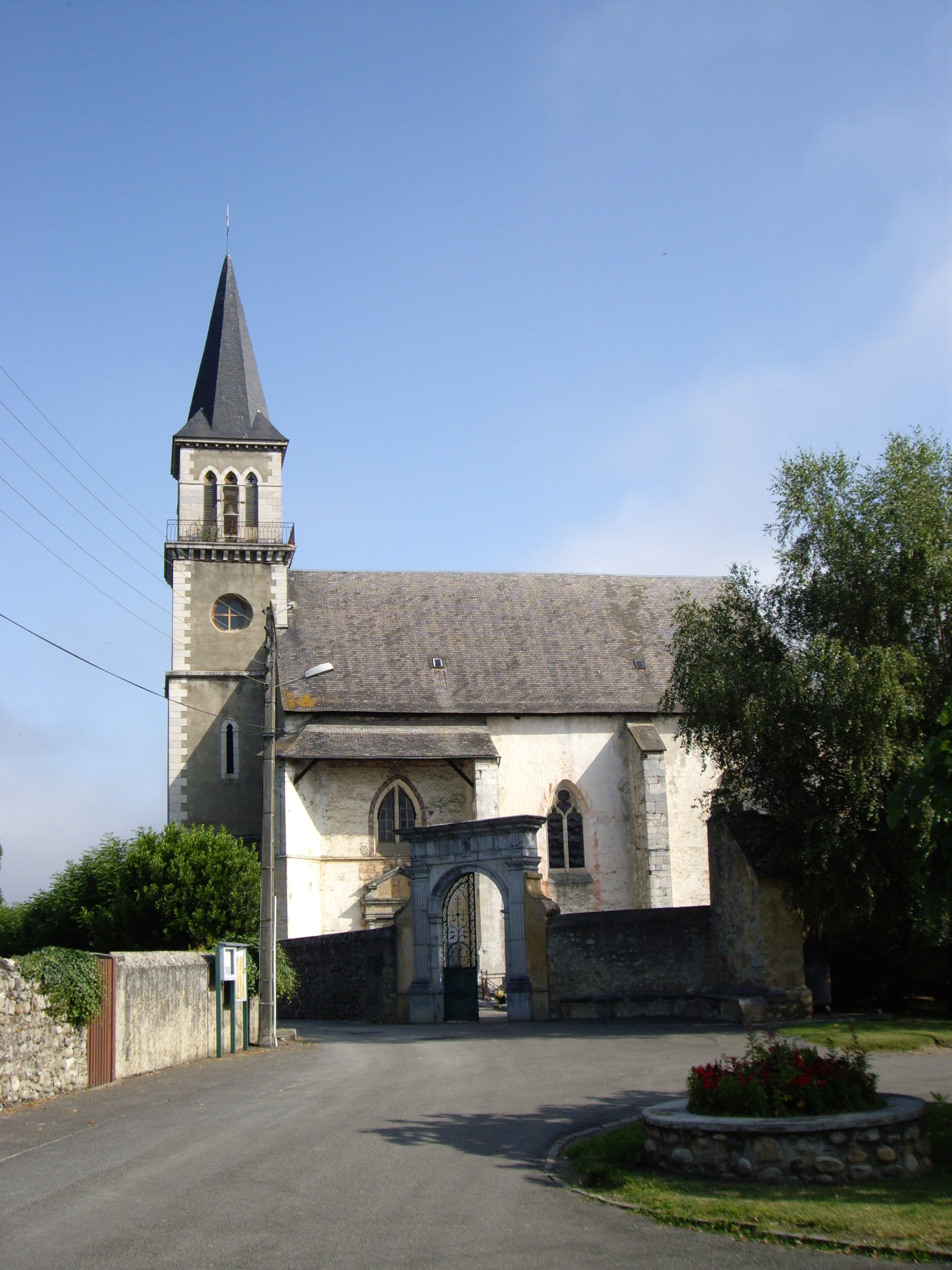
- The church of Saint-Saturnin

- Coat of arms
- Location of Pouzac
- Location within France Location within Occitanie
- Coordinates: 43°05′13″N 0°08′10″E
- Country: France
- Region: Occitania
- Department: Hautes-Pyrénées
- Arrondissement: Bagnères-de-Bigorre
- Canton: La Haute-Bigorre
- Intercommunality: CC de la Haute-Bigorre

Government
  - Mayor (2020–2026): Patricia Sentubery-Chagnot
- Area^{1}: 7.58 km^{2} (2.93 sq mi)
- Elevation: 505 m (1,657 ft)
- Highest elevation: 753 m (2,470 ft)
- Lowest elevation: 486 m (1,594 ft)
- Population (2023): 1,099
  - Density: 145/km^{2} (376/sq mi)
- Time zone: UTC+01:00 (CET)
  - Summer (DST): UTC+02:00 (CEST)
- INSEE/Postal code: 65370 /65200
- ^{1} French Land Register data, which excludes lakes, ponds, glaciers > 1 km^{2} (0.386 sq mi or 247 acres) and river estuaries.

Pouzac (French pronunciation: [puzak]; Occitan: Posac) is a commune in the Hautes-Pyrénées department in south-western France.

== See also ==
- Communes of the Hautes-Pyrénées department
