= Lannemezan =

- Commune
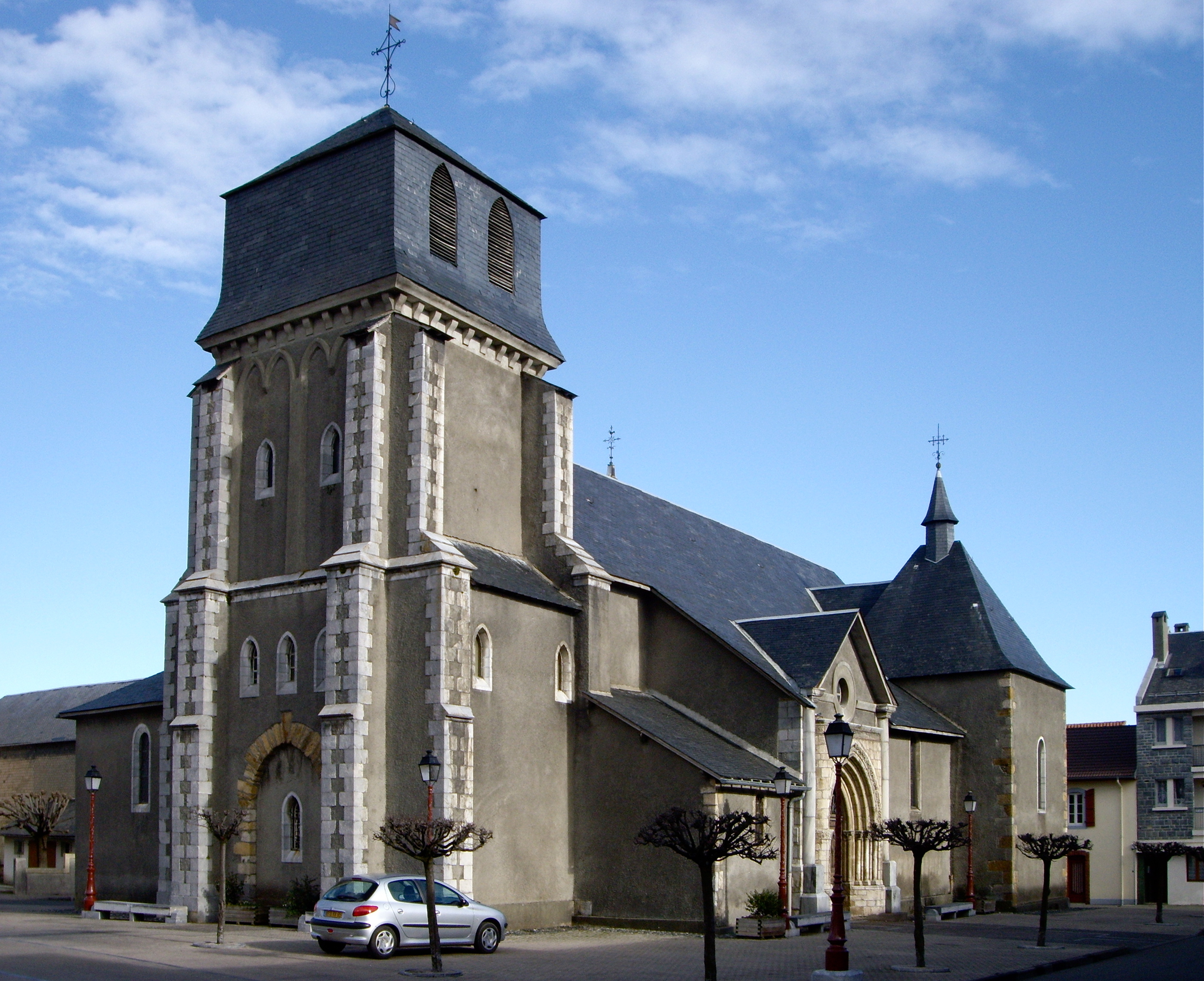
- A general view of the church of Saint Jean-Baptiste

- Coat of arms
- Location of Lannemezan
- Location within France Location within Occitanie
- Coordinates: 43°07′N 0°23′E
- Country: France
- Region: Occitania
- Department: Hautes-Pyrénées
- Arrondissement: Bagnères-de-Bigorre
- Canton: La Vallée de la Barousse
- Intercommunality: Plateau de Lannemezan

Government
  - Mayor (2020–2026): Bernard Plano
- Area^{1}: 19.03 km^{2} (7.35 sq mi)
- Elevation: 610 m (2,000 ft)
- Highest elevation: 647 m (2,123 ft)
- Lowest elevation: 442 m (1,450 ft)
- Population (2023): 5,811
  - Density: 305.4/km^{2} (790.9/sq mi)
- Time zone: UTC+01:00 (CET)
  - Summer (DST): UTC+02:00 (CEST)
- INSEE/Postal code: 65258 /65300
- ^{1} French Land Register data, which excludes lakes, ponds, glaciers > 1 km^{2} (0.386 sq mi or 247 acres) and river estuaries.

Lannemezan (French pronunciation: [lanməzɑ̃]; Gascon Occitan Lanamesa, "heath of the middle") is a commune in the Hautes-Pyrénées department and the Occitanie region in south-western France. The inhabitants are called Lannemezanais.

Lannemezan is the largest city in the Communauté de communes du Plateau de Lannemezan.

== Geography ==
The Petite Baïse has its source in the commune.

Lannemezan is around 30 kilometres (19 mi) east of Tarbes, and around 100 km south-west of Toulouse.

=== Geology and relief ===
Over 50 million years, driven by movements of compression, low relief which constitutes the Pre-Pyrenees has risen. Glaciers and streams that cascade down its slopes subject to mountain erosion which flows off from the foot of it. While continuing to rise, the mountain has erected the cluster of its deposits and thus forms the Plateau de Lannemezan, head of a gigantic piémont which puts its mark upon much of the southwest, up the Garonne at more than 100 kilometres (62 mi) to the north. High up and submitted to the four winds, the site already assigns itself an identity that would assist in its history and reputation.

The soil is composed of uncultivated and barren land, dotted with woodlands, coppicing, cut of marshes and heath. The terrain is of limestone origin with a topsoil up to 20 centimetres (7.9 in) deep. Peat moor is exploited near La Barthe-de-Neste. Analysis of the soil in the commune of Lannemezan shows the results presented in the following table.

Depth (cm)	% Clays	% Silts		% Sands		% of organic material in the layer
Depth (cm)	Totals (<2 μm)	Fines (2 to 20 μm)	Coarse (20 to 50 μm)	Fines (50 to 200 μm)	Coarse (200 to 2,000 μm)	% of organic material in the layer
0 to 20 cm (0.0 to 7.9 in)	25%	22%	10%	21%	19%	7.7%
20 to 55 cm (7.9 to 21.7 in)	26%	20%	11%	22%	20%	3.7%
55 to 100 cm (22 to 39 in)	17%	18%	8%	25%	32%	–
100 to 235 cm (39 to 93 in)	26%	17%	8%	21%	30%	–

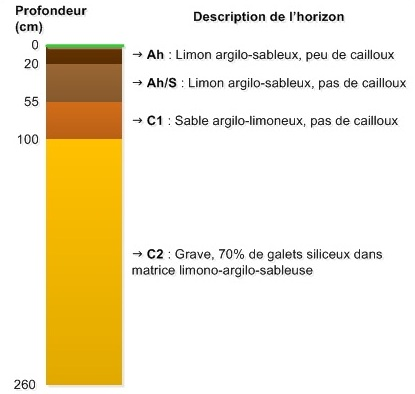
Subsoil characteristic of Lannemezan and its plateau

The plateau rises to over 600 metres (2,000 ft) above sea level in the vicinity of Lannemezan. The top of the foothills face the Pyrenean part of the Neste Valley, the river which then turns east at the foot of the plateau. Other rivers (Gers, Baïse, etc.), flow radially from this point to the northwest, north and northeast, and the altitude of the plateau decreases gradually. On the south side, this plateau is still connected to the Pyrenean massif by a narrow tongue of land between Izaux and Avezac. Otherwise, it ends to the southwest and the southeast by a steep overhang and residual hills (Capvern, Mauvezin, etc.) facing the Pyrenees.

=== Natural vegetation ===
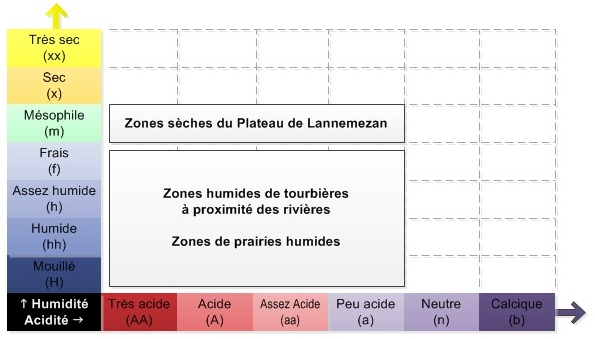
Diagram of the humidity/acidity (pH) of the vegetation on the plateau of Lannemezan

The natural vegetation of Lannemezan and its small region is characterised by a heathland landscape, although moisture of soils is highly variable depending on their location (particularly in relation to their proximity to water courses).

Thus, in wet areas near the rivers extend many bogs characterised by dwarf gorse (Ulex minor), St. John's wort (Hypericum elodes L.) marshes or wet meadows which extend Medusa's trumpets (Narcissus bulbocodium L.), of oatgrass (Arrhenatherum longifolium) or alder (Alnus).

In drier areas grow more woody species such as Pyrenean oak, also known under the name of tauzin oak (Quercus pyrenaica), as well as pedunculated oak (Quercus robur) or chestnut (Castanea sativa Mill).

In all cases, the soils are rather acidic type with adjustable humidity, which imposes certain constraints for the development of plant species. These development constraints are represented on the adjoining humidity/acidity chart.

=== Hydrography ===
Eighteen rivers have their sources on the Plateau de Lannemezan or pass through the territory of the commune. The main are listed in the following table.

Rivier	Length	Location of the source	Confluence	Location of the confluence
The Baïse	188 kilometres (117 mi)	Capvern (Hautes-Pyrénées)	Garonne (left bank)	Penne-d'Agenais (Lot-et-Garonne)
The Petite Baïse (ou Baïse devant)	75 kilometres (47 mi)	Lannemezan (Hautes-Pyrénées)	Baïse (right bank)	L'Isle-de-Noé (Gers)
The Baïse Darré	11 kilometres (6.8 mi)	Avezac-Prat-Lahitte (Hautes-Pyrénées)	Petite Baïse (left bank)	Clarens (Hautes-Pyrénées)
The Sole	20 kilometres (12 mi)	Tajan (Hautes-Pyrénées)	Petite Baïse (right bank)	Guizerix (Hautes-Pyrénées)
The Galavette	13 kilometres (8.1 mi)	Lannemezan (Hautes-Pyrénées)	Petite Baïse (right bank)	Galez (Hautes-Pyrénées)
The Baïsole	47 kilometres (29 mi)	Lagrange (Hautes-Pyrénées)	Baïse (right bank)	L'Isle-de-Noé (Gers)
The Gers	175 kilometres (109 mi)	Lannemezan (Hautes-Pyrénées)	Garonne (left bank)	Agen (Lot-et-Garonne)
The Neste	73 kilometres (45 mi)	Arreau (Hautes-Pyrénées); Réunion des Neste d'Aure and Neste du Louron	Garonne (left bank)	Montréjeau (Haute-Garonne)
The Save	148 kilometres (92 mi)	La Barthe-de-Neste (Hautes-Pyrénées)	Garonne (left bank)	Grenade (Haute-Garonne)
The Arrats	131 kilometres (81 mi)	Plateau de Lannemezan (Hautes-Pyrénées)	Garonne (left bank)	Valence-d'Agen (Tarn-et-Garonne)
The Bouès	63 kilometres (39 mi)	Capvern (Hautes-Pyrénées)	Arros (right bank)	Beaumarchés (Gers)
The Gimone	136 kilometres (85 mi)	Plateau de Lannemezan (Hautes-Pyrénées)	Garonne (left bank)	Castelferrus (Tarn-et-Garonne)
The Gesse	53 kilometres (33 mi)	Plateau de Lannemezan (Hautes-Pyrénées)	Save (left bank)	Espaon (Gers)
The Louge	100 kilometres (62 mi)	Plateau de Lannemezan (Hautes-Pyrénées)	Garonne (left bank)	Muret (Haute-Garonne)

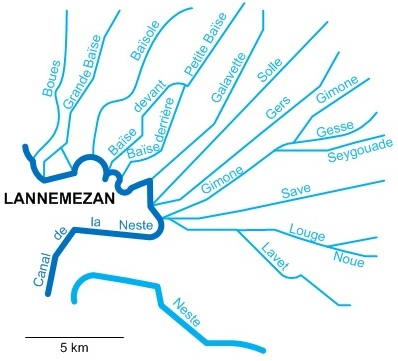
Rivers originating on the Plateau de Lannemezan

=== Natural risks and disasters ===
The commune is placed under supervision in relation to some possible natural and technological hazards:

- Flood
- Industrial risk
- Earthquake: Zone of seismicity 1B
- Transport of dangerous goods

Recent natural disasters on the commune are as follows, since 1980 (from most recent to oldest):

Date	Natural disaster observed in Lannemezan
24 May 2007	Floods and mudslides
27 July 2006	Floods and mudslides
1 July 2003 to 30 September 2003	Consecutive differential landslides due to drought and soil rehydration
25 December 1999 to 29 December 1999	Floods, mudslides and landslides
6 November 1982 to 10 November 1982	Storm

=== Location ===
General location:

Lannemezan is a bastide situated in the centre of the Plateau de Lannemezan between Tarbes and Toulouse on the Petite Baïse. Between the Atlantic and Mediterranean, at the outlet of the valleys of the Pyrenees, Lannemezan imposes itself as a privileged strategic its geographical position city.

Lannemezan is located at the east of the department of the Hautes-Pyrénées, 12 kilometres (7.5 mi) from the border with Haute-Garonne to the east, 40 kilometres (25 mi) from the border with Gers in the north and 75 kilometres (47 mi) from the border with Spain to the south (Aragnouet-Bielsa Tunnel).

=== Bordering communes ===
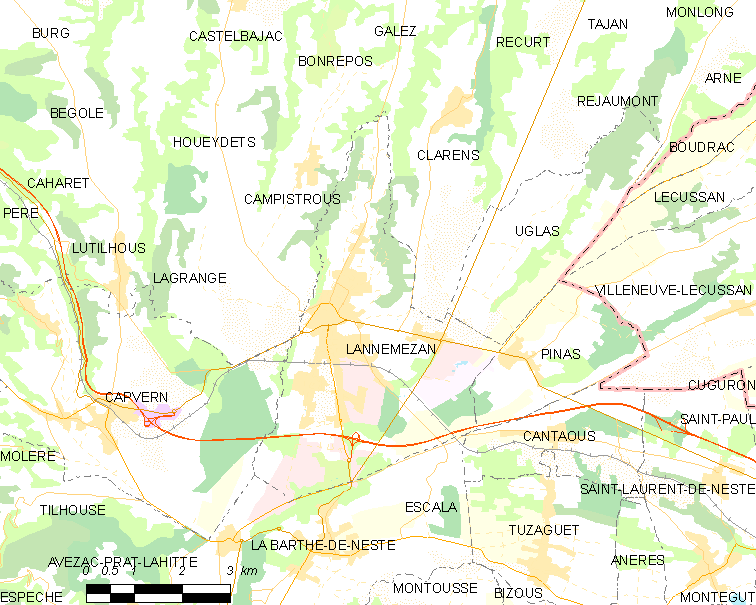
Map of the commune of Lannemezan and nearby communes

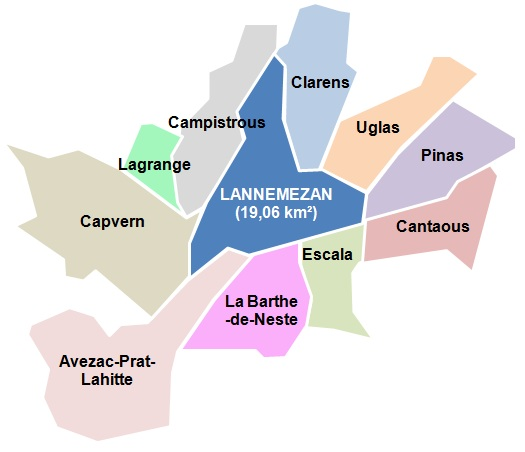
Neighbouring communes of Lannemezan

Spatially, Lannemezan is wedged between the following nine communes: Campistrous to the northwest, Clarens in the northeast, Capvern to the west, Uglas and Pinas to the east, Avezac-Prat-Lahitte in the southwest, La Barthe-de-Neste and Escala to the south, and Cantaous to the southeast.

==== Distance to some large French cities ====
The orientation and location of Lannemezan, compared to some large French cities, is given in the following table (distances are given as the fastest route by road):

City	Tarbes	Toulouse	Bayonne	Bordeaux	Montpellier	Marseille	Nantes	Lyon	Nice	Paris	Brest	Lille	Strasbourg
Distance	37 km (23 mi)	126 km (78 mi)	190 km (120 mi)	268 km (167 mi)	359 km (223 mi)	524 km (326 mi)	609 km (378 mi)	656 km (408 mi)	688 km (428 mi)	801 km (498 mi)	907 km (564 mi)	1,017 km (632 mi)	1,147 km (713 mi)
Direction	(W)	(NE)	(W)	(NW)	(E-NE)	(E-NE)	(N-NW)	(NE)	(E)	(N-NE)	(N-NW)	(N)	(NE)

=== Area ===
The city of Lannemezan has an area of 1,903 hectares (4,700 acres), which is ranked:

Territory	Ranking of Lannemezan by area
France	8,732nd / 36,683
Midi-Pyrénées	687th / 3,021
Hautes-Pyrénées	41st / 474
Arrondissement of Bagnères-de-Bigorre	20th / 160
Canton of Lannemezan	2nd / 26

=== Altitude ===
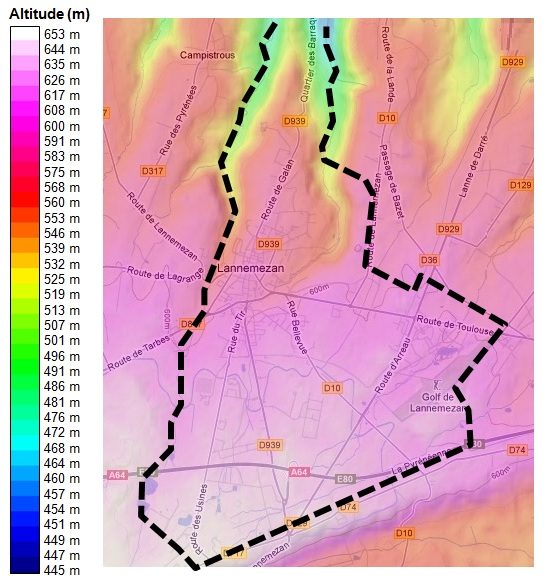
Elevations observed in the town of Lannemezan: Minimum: 442 metres (1,450 ft) Maximum: 647 metres (2,123 ft) Average: 545 metres (1,788 ft)

Changes in altitude are important on the territory of the commune. The minimum altitude is 442 metres (1,450 ft), the maximum altitude is 647 metres (2,123 ft). The average elevation is 545 metres (1,788 ft), and the Town Hall lies Meanwhile, 580 metres (1,900 ft).

=== Climate ===
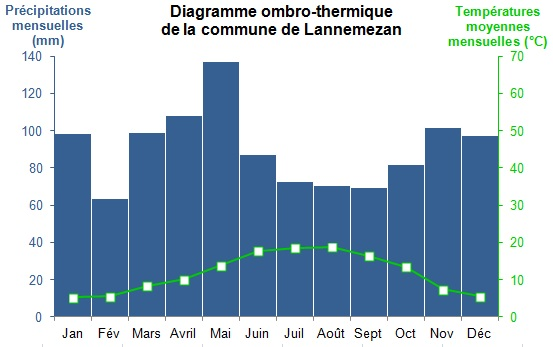
Diagram of the temperature in the shade in Lannemezan. Using a double scale for the height of precipitation, there is a lack of overflow of the temperature curve (green) compared to precipitation (blue) showing the absence of periods of drought in the commune

Tarbes-Ossun weather station 'normals' reveal a rather cool climate, rainy in winter and hot and stormy in summer. The average annual temperature 12 °C (54 °F) is relatively low for such latitude, with a fairly low seasonal amplitude, 6 °C (43 °F) on average during the winter and 19 °C (66 °F) during the summer. However, the winter temperature has reached a record low of −21 °C (−6 °F) in January 1985 and has also exceeded 39 °C (102 °F) in midsummer. These high temperatures are typical of the foehn wind, due to the relief of the Pyrenees.

In Tarbes, fog and strong winds are rare. These climate characteristics of Tarbes are found in the north of the department, but with more fog in winter, and warmer daytime temperatures and lower precipitation in the summer. Conversely on the closer terrain the average quantities of precipitation increase. This varies greatly depending on exposure and slopes, but become abundant near the border ridges. The area between plain and mountain has a more humid climate and less sunny than the rest of the department. In the mountains the sun shines frequently above a sea of clouds and the wind blows stronger and more often than on the plain (breezes and sometimes very strong winds from the south).

The climate of the Hautes-Pyrenees is characterised by a rainy and cool springtime, especially snowy at altitude; weather from the northwest is blocked by the relief and a phenomenon of precipitation at altitude has the consequence of strong accumulations of snow at altitude until mid-May. Summer is mild but stormy, autumn is generally sunny and pleasant, usually followed by a relatively mild winter on the plains and cold above 300–400 metres (980–1,310 ft).

Records of temperatures and precipitation are collected in the following table:

Climate data for Lannemezan (1991−2020 normals, extremes 1970−present)
Month	Jan	Feb	Mar	Apr	May	Jun	Jul	Aug	Sep	Oct	Nov	Dec	Year
Record high °C (°F)	21.4 (70.5)	23.6 (74.5)	25.6 (78.1)	28.0 (82.4)	30.9 (87.6)	35.0 (95.0)	37.1 (98.8)	37.2 (99.0)	33.0 (91.4)	30.3 (86.5)	25.8 (78.4)	24.1 (75.4)	37.2 (99.0)
Mean daily maximum °C (°F)	9.3 (48.7)	10.1 (50.2)	13.3 (55.9)	15.1 (59.2)	18.4 (65.1)	21.9 (71.4)	23.8 (74.8)	24.3 (75.7)	21.3 (70.3)	17.7 (63.9)	12.3 (54.1)	10.2 (50.4)	16.5 (61.7)
Daily mean °C (°F)	5.1 (41.2)	5.6 (42.1)	8.4 (47.1)	10.2 (50.4)	13.6 (56.5)	17.1 (62.8)	19.0 (66.2)	19.4 (66.9)	16.3 (61.3)	13.0 (55.4)	8.1 (46.6)	6.0 (42.8)	11.8 (53.2)
Mean daily minimum °C (°F)	0.8 (33.4)	1.1 (34.0)	3.5 (38.3)	5.3 (41.5)	8.9 (48.0)	12.3 (54.1)	14.1 (57.4)	14.4 (57.9)	11.4 (52.5)	8.4 (47.1)	3.9 (39.0)	1.8 (35.2)	7.2 (45.0)
Record low °C (°F)	−17.0 (1.4)	−14.1 (6.6)	−10.7 (12.7)	−3.9 (25.0)	−1.1 (30.0)	2.1 (35.8)	6.4 (43.5)	5.7 (42.3)	2.0 (35.6)	−2.8 (27.0)	−10.0 (14.0)	−11.3 (11.7)	−17.0 (1.4)
Average precipitation mm (inches)	113.0 (4.45)	92.0 (3.62)	100.8 (3.97)	121.7 (4.79)	130.1 (5.12)	92.2 (3.63)	82.9 (3.26)	71.7 (2.82)	76.6 (3.02)	89.9 (3.54)	136.6 (5.38)	112.3 (4.42)	1,219.8 (48.02)
Average precipitation days (≥ 1.0 mm)	11.9	11.0	11.4	13.0	13.3	11.1	9.8	9.5	9.0	10.5	12.6	11.3	134.3
Source: Météo-France

==== Sunshine and rainfall (since 1999) ====
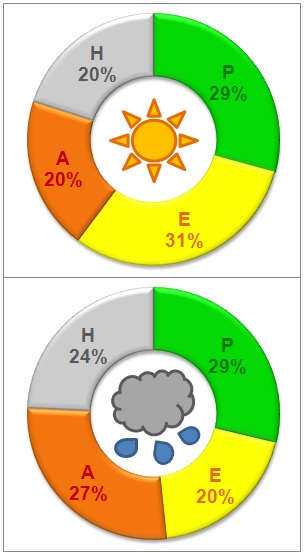
By French season, annual duration of sunshine (top) and the annual amount of precipitation (bottom) in Lannemezan.

Sunshine and precipitation values are visible in the following table:

Criteria		1999	2000	2001	2002	2003	2004	2005	2006	2007	2008	2009	2010	2011	Average (1999–2011)	Minimum (year)	Maximum (year)
Sunshine (hours)	Total	1,795	2,018	1,977	1,768	2,006	1,876	2,221	2,119	1,959	1,835	2,013	1,945	2,087	1,969	1,768 (2002)	2,221 (2005)
Sunshine (hours)	Winter	349	471	350	449	413	369	465	375	346	412	467	326	409	395	326 (2010)	471 (2000)
Sunshine (hours)	Spring	509	563	582	495	588	579	698	616	524	500	560	605	630	575	495 (2002)	698 (2005)
Sunshine (hours)	Summer	555	658	607	495	681	558	653	665	614	601	608	626	596	610	495 (2002)	681 (2003)
Sunshine (hours)	Autumn	382	326	438	329	324	370	405	463	475	322	378	388	452	389	322 (2008)	475 (2007)
Precipitation (mm)	Total	1,172	1,129	874	1,198	885	992	891	826	1,029	1,192	1,125	944	979	1,013	826 (2006)	1,198 (2002)
Precipitation (mm)	Winter	283	189	324	221	229	288	132	261	266	342	281	214	205	246	132 (2005)	342 (2008)
Precipitation (mm)	Spring	331	412	281	349	207	204	258	199	390	383	308	260	234	291	199 (2006)	412 (2000)
Precipitation (mm)	Summer	283	205	150	231	178	238	246	189	162	146	139	157	292	198	139 (2009)	292 (2011)
Precipitation (mm)	Autumn	275	324	119	398	270	263	255	176	211	322	397	312	248	277	119 (2001)	398 (2002)

==== Extreme temperatures and precipitation records (since 1999) ====
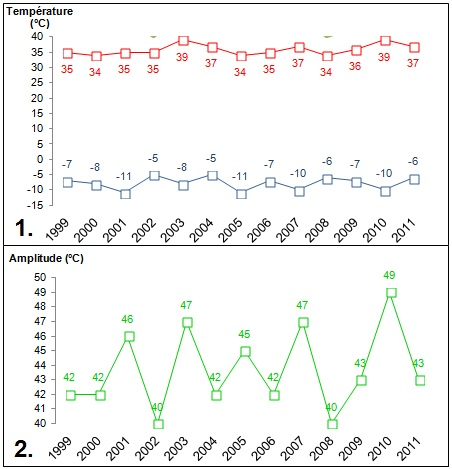
1: Extreme temperatures observed between 1999 and 2011. 2: Amplitudes of temperatures between 1999 and 2011

Records of temperatures and precipitation amounts, between 1999 and 2011, are listed in the following table:

Records		1999	2000	2001	2002	2003	2004	2005	2006	2007	2008	2009	2010	2011	Record (Year)
Temperature (°C)	High (°C)	35	34	35	35	39	37	34	35	37	34	36	39	37	39 (2003 & 2010)
Temperature (°C)	Low (°C)	−7	−8	−11	−5	−8	−5	−11	−7	−10	−6	−7	−10	−6	-11 (2005)
Monthly precipitation (mm/month)	Max.	155	165	176	181	136	176	139	151	171	218	233	184	127	233 (2009)
Monthly precipitation (mm/month)	Min.	27	5	18	21	12	6	0	18	28	13	29	28	26	0 (2005)

==== Lannemezan climate according to the Köppen classification ====
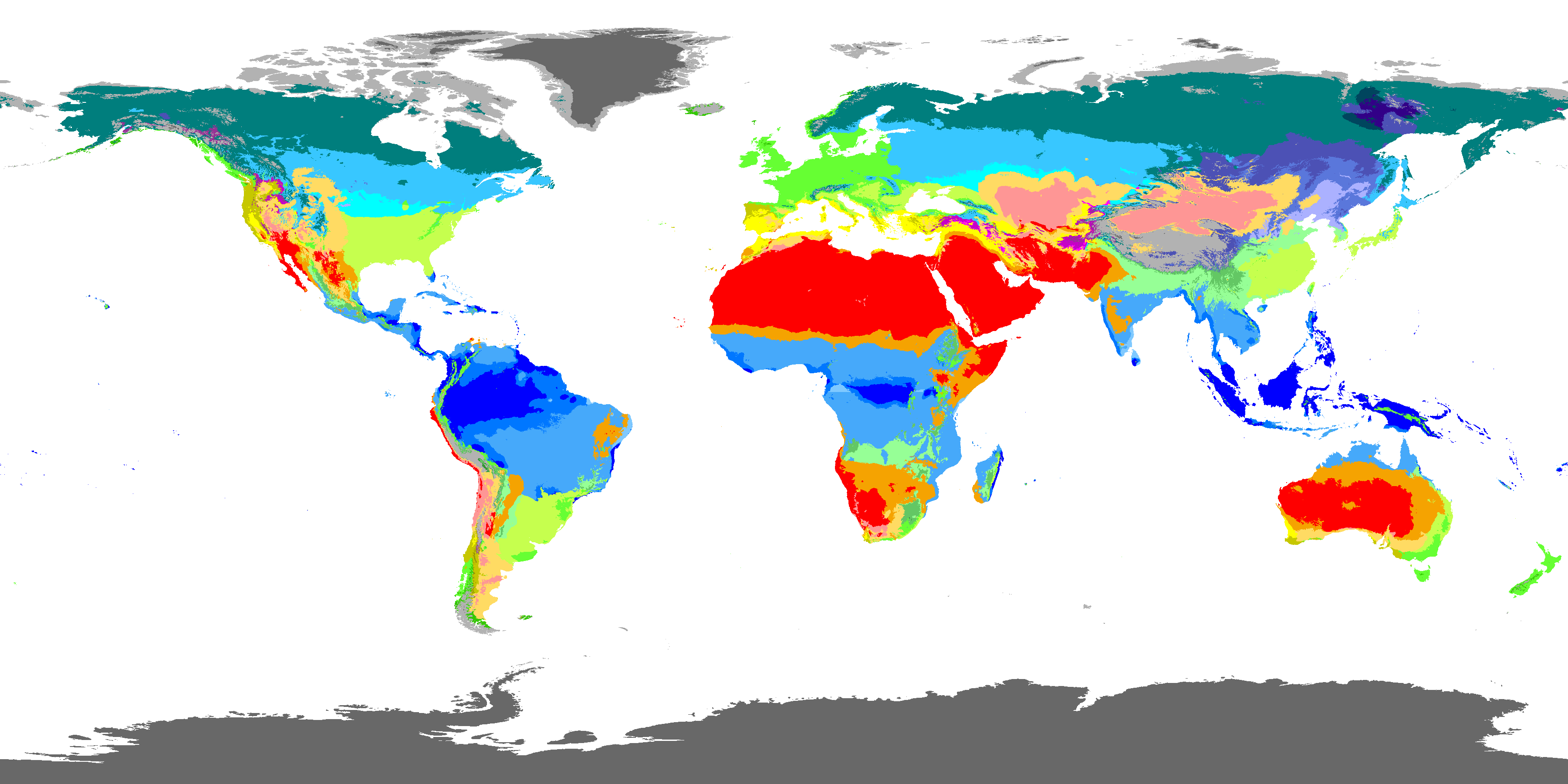
The Köppen classification

According to the Köppen classification, the town of Lannemezan is located in the "Cfb" category:

The C (1st letter) expresses the climate: A temperate climate:

- The three coldest months average temperatures between −3 °C (27 °F) and 18 °C (64 °F) (5.43 °C (41.77 °F) in Lannemezan)
- Average temperature of the hottest month above 10 °C (50 °F) (18.8 °C (65.8 °F) in Lannemezan)
- The seasons of summer and winter are well defined

The f (2nd letter) expresses the rainfall:

- Humid climate
- Precipitation every month of the year
- No dry season

The b (3rd letter) expresses the temperature variations: been temperate:

- Average temperature of the warmest month of less than or equal to 22 °C (72 °F) (18.8 °C (65.8 °F) in Lannemezan)
- Average temperatures of the four hottest months above 10 °C (50 °F) (17.90 °C (64.22 °F) in Lannemezan)

=== Channels of communication ===
==== Road Network ====
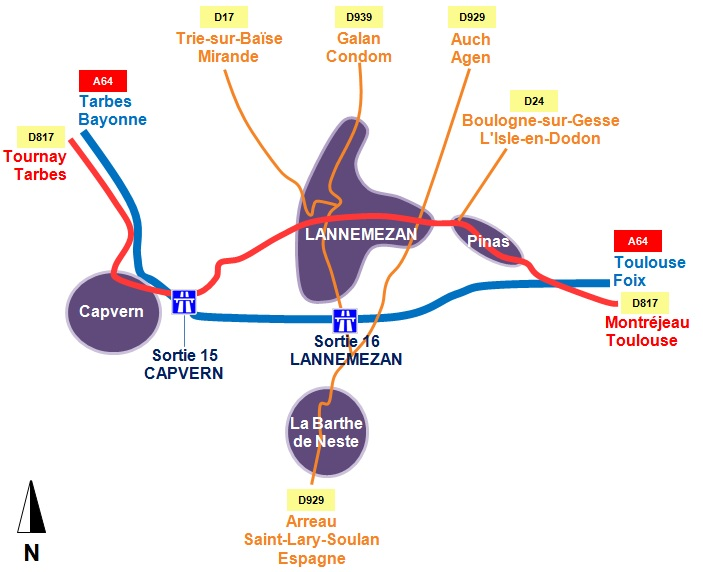
Main roads in Lannemezan

Lannemezan is a town in transition, served by many roads. The majority of these are in the north/south and east/west directions. Here are the details:

Orientation of axis	Route	Axis	Previous commune	Following commune
East/West (Toulouse to Bayonne)	A64 E80 : Autoroute La Pyrénéenne; 15 Capvern (west); 16 Lannemezan (south)	Toulouse / Bayonne	17 Montréjeau	14 Tournay
East/West (Toulouse to Bayonne)	D817 (ex N117)	Toulouse / Bayonne	Pinas	Capvern
North/South (Gers to Spain)	D929	Auch / Arreau	Uglas	La Barthe-de-Neste
North/South (Gers to Spain)	D939	Galan / Lannemezan	Galez	–
North/South (Gers to Spain)	D24	Boulogne-sur-Gesse / Lannemezan	Villeneuve-Lécussan	–
North/South (Gers to Spain)	D17	Trie-sur-Baïse / Lannemezan	Campistrous	–

==== Rail network ====
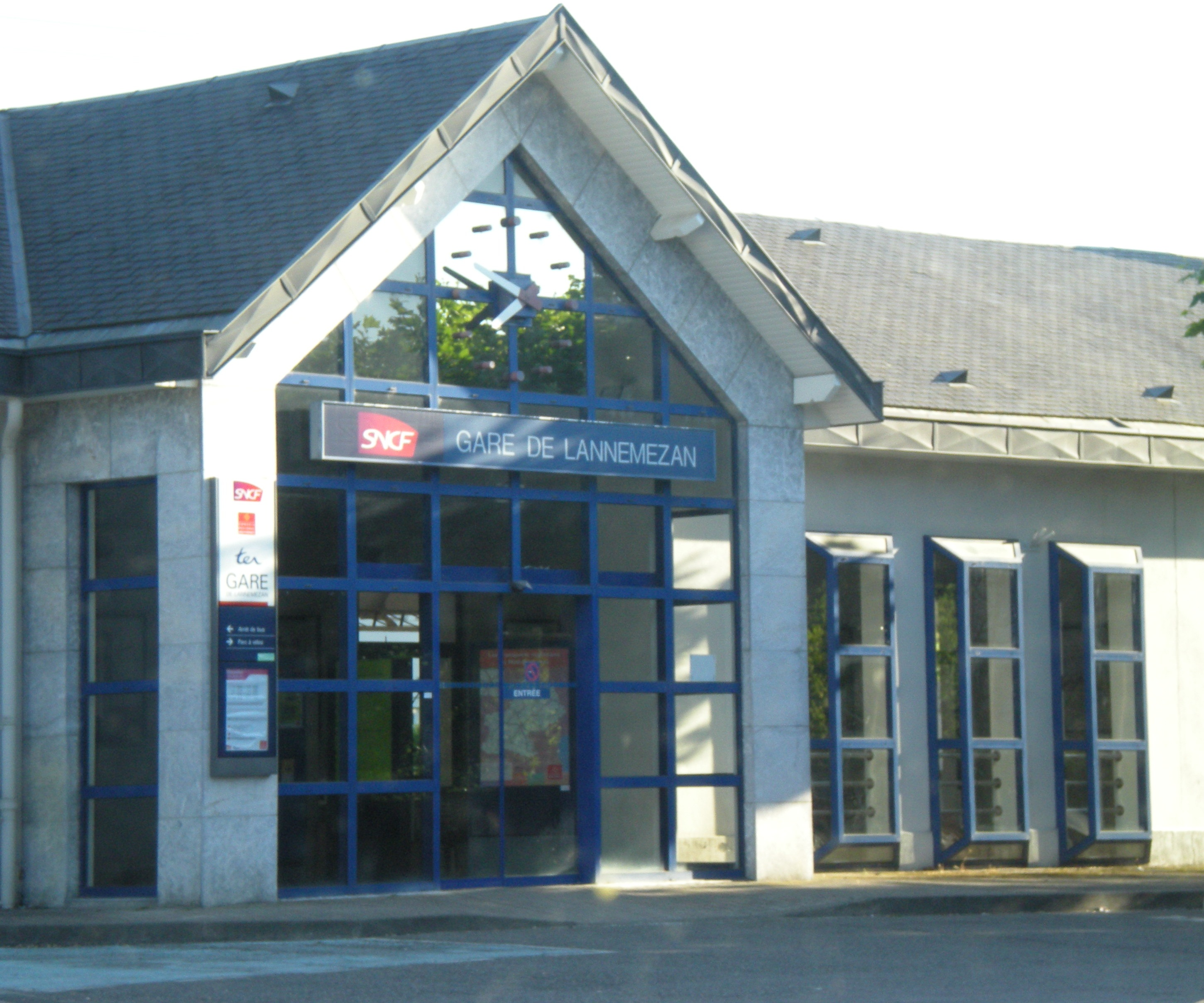
Lannemezan SNCF railway station, on the Bayonne-Toulouse line

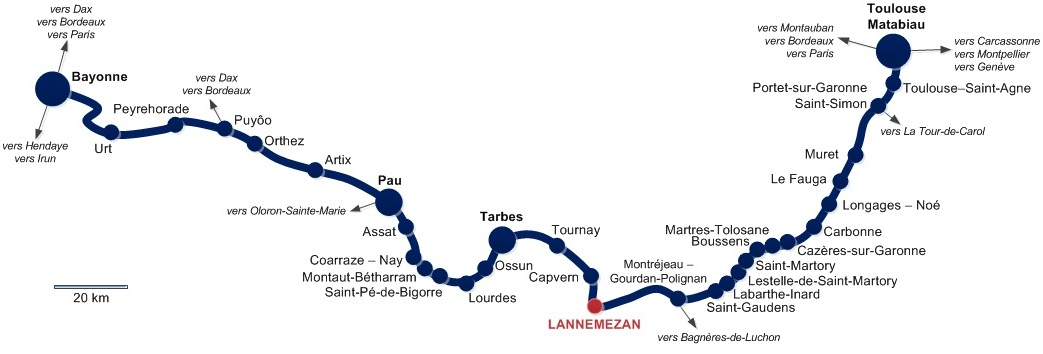
Location of Lannemezan on the Bayonne-Toulouse line

Lannemezan is located on the Toulouse-Bayonne line. The SNCF Gare de Lannemezan is situated on Avenue de la Gare, and is on the line from Toulouse to Bayonne, 1.7 kilometres (1.1 mi) from the city centre. The previous station is that of Montréjeau-Gourdan-Polignan coming from Toulouse, the next station is that of Capvern. Another line ran from Lannemezan to Arreau-Cadéac station, but it is no longer in service. The different types of train currently serving Lannemezan station are:

Type of train	Line	Preceding station	Following station
Intercités	Toulouse-Matabiau / Hendaye	Montréjeau-Gourdan-Polignan	Tarbes
TER Occitanie	Toulouse-Matabiau / Pau	Montréjeau-Gourdan-Polignan	Capvern

A proposed central crossing of the Pyrenees, linking Toulouse to Zaragoza, is currently under development. This line would use the current Toulouse/Bayonne route, as far as Lannemezan. Lannemezan station would be a railway junction, from which a new line would join Spain, through a tunnel dug in the Aure Valley (at Hèches). This new line would bring relief to the other two traditional routes (by Hendaye in the Basque country and Cerbère on the border with Catalonia), while reducing the isolation of the central Pyrenees and the Aran Valley in Spain.

==== Airports ====
Three international airports are located within 150 kilometres (93 mi) of Lannemezan:

- Tarbes–Lourdes–Pyrénées Airport (TLP), 40 kilometres (25 mi)
- Pau Pyrénées Airport, 90 kilometres (56 mi)
- Toulouse–Blagnac Airport, 130 kilometres (81 mi)

== Urbanism ==
=== Urban morphology ===
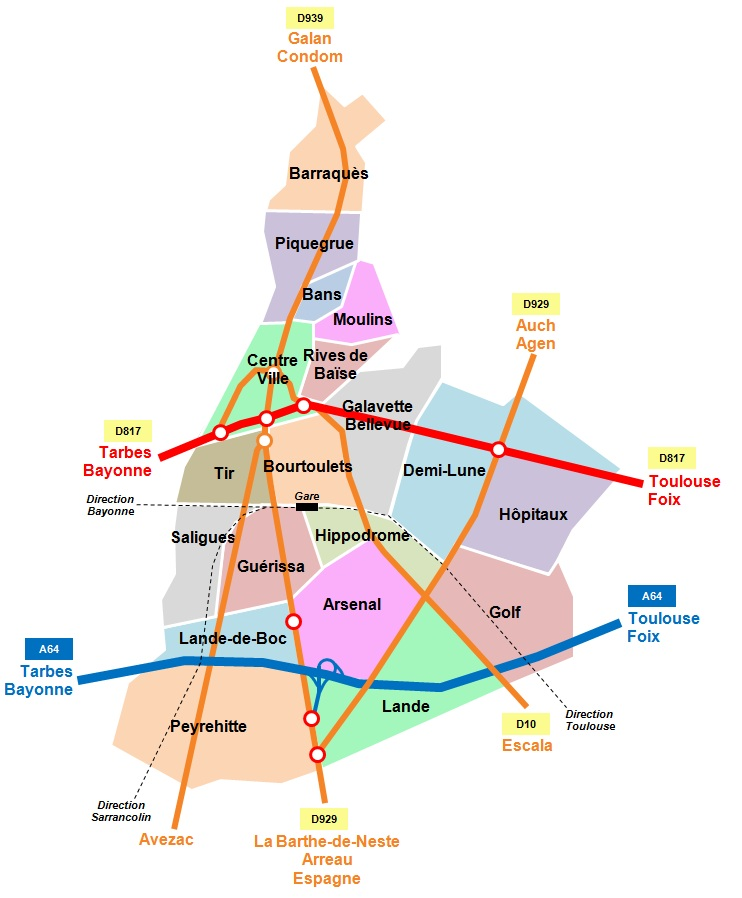
Urban morphology: Location of the quarters of Lannemezan

The town of Lannemezan has a general north/south orientation, and consists of the following main areas:

- Le centre-ville: built around the town hall and the Saint Jean Baptiste Church, the town centre is the historic heart of the town and was renovated in the last decade. Thus, the new Place des Droits de l'Homme et du Citoyen [Square of Human Rights and the Citizen] with the Tourist Office and which faces a recent bandstand which is the place of entertainments and events of the town. Rue Thiers, the central street, is the most commercial of the commune and the entrance to the Paul Bert shopping mall, where the Salle du Renouveau du Plateau [Room of the Renewal of the Plateau] is situated. Likewise, the Place de la Poste, a recently renovated square, allows a pleasant rest thanks to its two fountains and its flower beds.
- Las Moulias, les Bans and Piquegrue: To the north, the Moulins quarter (or las moulias) around the cité des bans, of the college, is changing thanks to the construction of new subdivisions and a health centre.
- Les Bourtoulets, la Galavette and l'Hippodrome: Around the Boulevard des Tilleuls and near the SNCF railway station, the quarter is located higher than the town centre and is spread around a large boulevard which is pleasant for walks.
- Le Guérissa, la Lande and les Saligues: The most recent quarter, is located on the edge of the woodland of the Plantade and the Canal de la Neste. It largely consists of detached houses along many green areas ensuring calm for their inhabitants.
- La Demi-Lune: Away from the city, this neighborhood is built around the Demi-Lune leisure park, bordering the Canal de la Neste, the golf course and the hospital complex of Lannemezan.

=== Housing ===
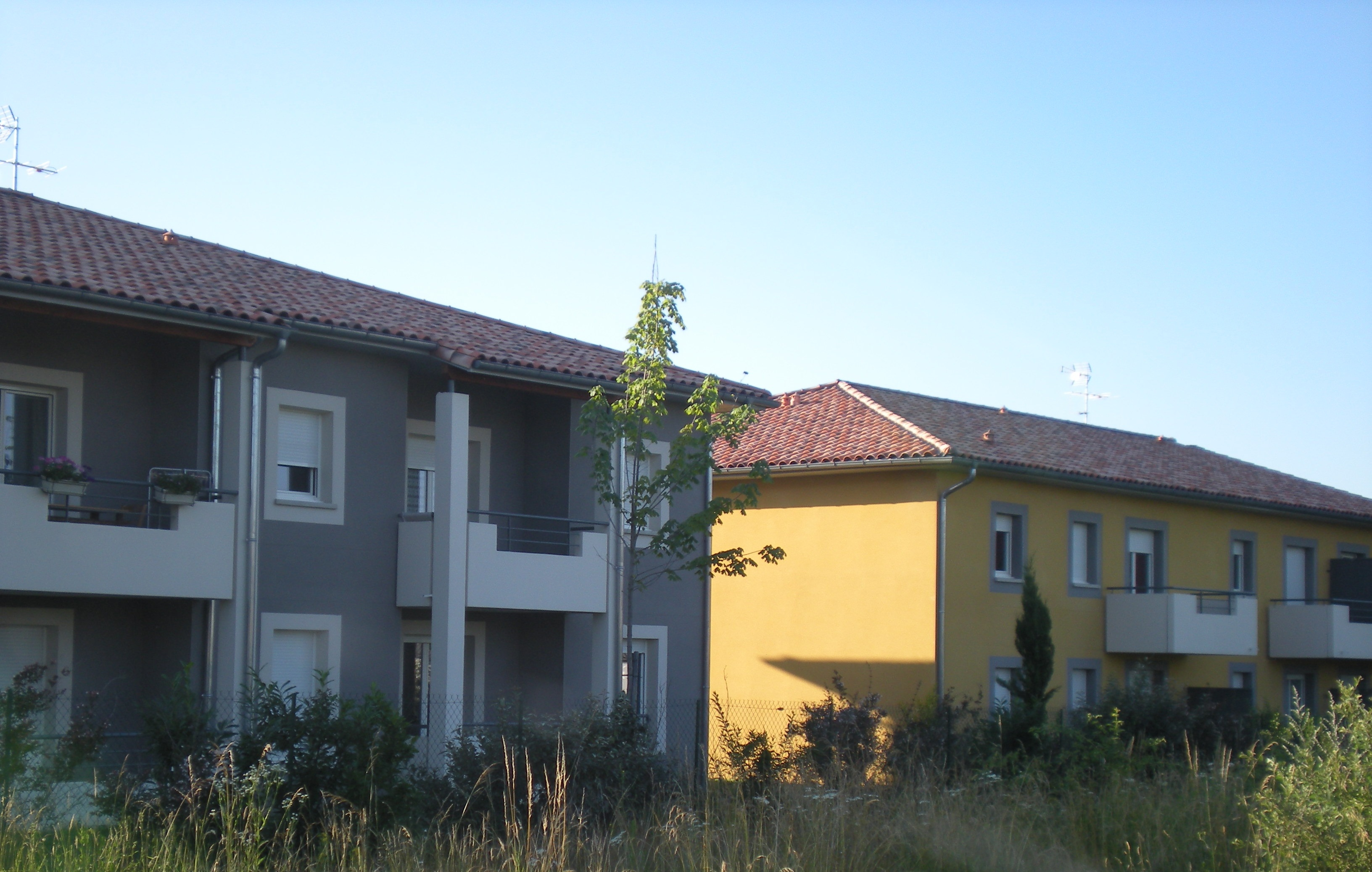
One of the new homes built in Lannemezan, near the railway station

The statistics for housing in the town are grouped in the following table:

Type	Lannemezan	National average
Principal residences	85.5%	83%
Secondary residences	3.5%	10.1%
Vacant housing	11%	8%
Villas	57.4%	56.8%
Apartments	38.4%	40.4%
Other types of housing	4.2%	2.8%
Owners	50.9%	55.3%
Tenants	42.8%	39.8%
Persons with free housing	6.3%	4.9%

=== Public transport ===
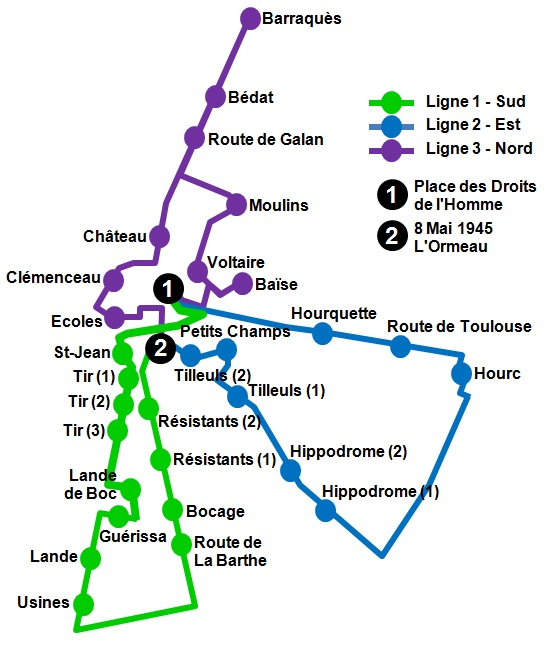
Bus routes of Lannemezan

A shuttle was set up two days a week (Wednesday and Friday), with special access for seniors. Three services are available with stops on the following roads:

Route 1 South route (14 stops)	Route 2 East route (9 stops)	Route 3 North route (10 stops)
Place des droits de l'homme
Rue Saint Jean	Rue du Hourquet	Rue de la Baïse
Rue du tir (3 stops)	Route de Toulouse	Rue Voltaire
Rue de la lande de boc	Rue du Hourc	Rue des moulins
Rue du Guérissa	Rue de l'hippodrome (2 stops)	Route de Galan
Rue de la lande	Boulevard des tilleuls	Chemin du Bédat
Rue des usines	Rue des petits champs	Rue des barraquès
Route de la Barthe de Neste	Boulevard des tilleuls	Place du Château
Allée du bocage		Rue Georges Clemenceau
Rue des résistants (2 stops)		Rue des Écoles
Rue du 8 mai 1945
Rue du 8 mai 1945 – Place de l'Ormeau

=== Development projects ===
==== New subdivisions ====
Very many real estate projects have been launched in the city, to improve habitation in Lannemezan, as well as to increase the housing capacity, to limit the effect of the Lannemezan population decrease.

Among these, the Clos des Moulins, delivered in 2007, presents 44 units spread across four-storey buildings, close to the college and the stadium. Always close to the college, the cité des familles consists of 16 moderate-rent housing. In 2008, two other residences were opened near the Des Bourtoulets Quarter, Boulevard des Tilleuls and the station: The Villalodge du Parc, consisting of 16 villas and 54 apartments, and the residence of la Cheneraie, consisting of 62 apartments spread over four-storey buildings. Finally, north of the town, on the road to Galan, the Bastide de Piquegrue was created in 2009. It contains 34 semi-detached villas.

==== City centre and the Place du Château ====
At the level of the rehabilitation of the city centre, the majority of the streets and squares have been remade for nine to 15 years. A renovation project of the façades, in association with the mayor's office, has been organized. Lastly, the construction of buildings in the Place du Château, scheduled for 2010, will be used to completely close the place to give it a more urban character.

==== The CM10 conversion ====
The town of Lannemezan bought the 110 hectares (270 acres) of military land from the Centre Mobilisateur No. 10 to the State in 2009, for the sum of €930,000. On this land, three areas will be delineated: The first zone of trade and crafts, the second will be used for the construction of a tertiary residence and finally the last area will be a space of inter-communal development.

== Toponymy ==
Located halfway between the Atlantic and the Mediterranean, it is based on the Plateau de Lannemezan, the Gascon Occitan word Lanamesa: The "heath of the middle". Lannemezan is also made up of the lande de Boc (lande du bouc), former den of witches and bandouliers (highwaymen) which gradually declined as a result of the hard work of men, both agricultural and industrial.

== History ==
=== The Middle Ages ===
Géraud of Aure-Larboust, the lord who ruled on the Plateau de Lannemezan, founded the fortified village of Lennemezan in the Lande de Boc in 1274, probably on the site of an earlier watchtower. To populate the place, he granted a charter franchise.

In 1345, Gaston III of Foix-Béarn bought Lannemezan from Géraud II of Aure-Larboust for price of 1,700 livres tournois and attaches the village to the Viscount of Nébouzan. In 1388, the chronicler Jean Froissart passes by "the Châtel of Lamesen".

=== Early Modern era ===
In 1500, Catherine of Navarre, heir of the property of Foix-Béarn, granted Lannemezan the right to hold a market every Wednesday, as well as a fair four times a year. In 1569, his granddaughter Jeanne d'Albret charged Gabriel I of Montgomery to regain the land confiscated by the King of France. At the head of a Protestant army of 3,000 men, Montgomery set upon taking the Pyrenean country. At Lannemezan, the St. John the Baptist Church and the houses of the priests were burned.

In 1607, Henri IV linked the Viscount of Nébouzan to the Kingdom of France and in 1630, the city had 130 feus.

During the Revolution, Lannemezan was attached to the department of the Hautes-Pyrénées. Its first mayor, Dominique Lagleize, was appointed in 1790. The last lord, Marc II Bertrand François de Lassus, was sentenced to death by the Revolutionary Court of Paris, and was sent to the guillotine in 1794.

=== 19th century ===
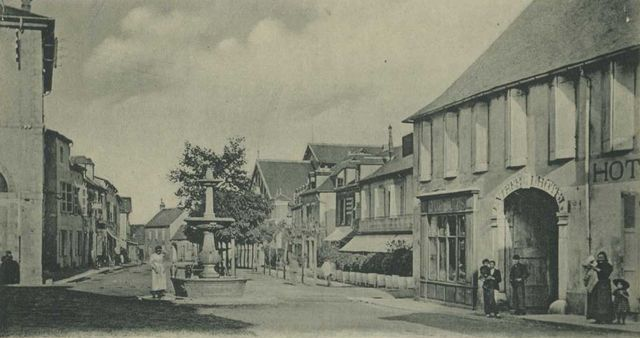
Ancient fountain of the Place de la République

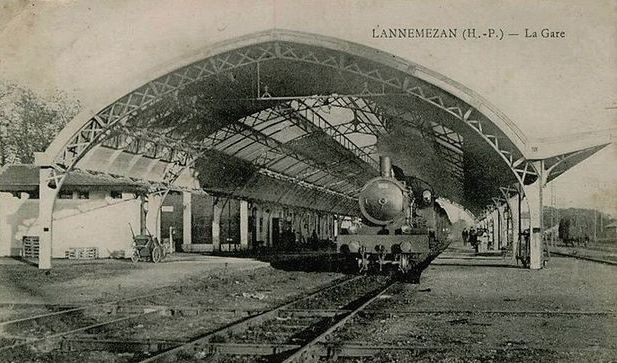
The railway station at the start of the 20th century

Throughout the 19th century, Lannemezan acquired various pieces of infrastructure.

A fountain, since moved, was located opposite the town hall in 1848.

The railway station was commissioned in 1867 by the Chemins de fer du Midi and the Canal latéral à la Garonne.

The grain market, a disappeared work by the architect Isidore Bonnemaison, was built to mark the centenary of the Revolution in 1889.

=== 20th century and the beginning of the 21st century ===
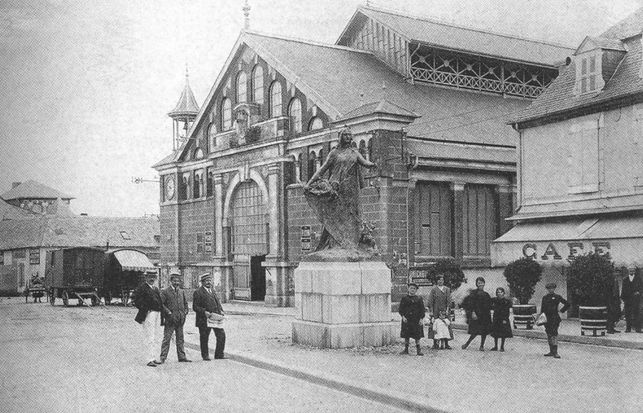
The grain market (1889–1967) and druidess statue (1911–1943)

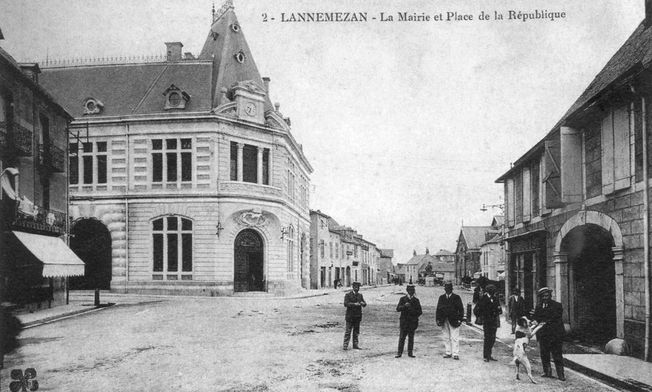
The town hall (inaugurated in 1911)

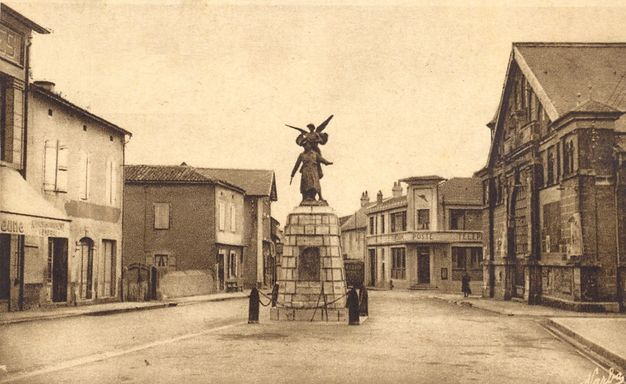
The centre of Lannemezan in the 1950s

The development of Lannemezan was accentuated in the 20th century. It became a real city with businesses and industries. However, farming remains active.

==== Impressive growth (1900–1970) ====
===== Emergence of the Peyrehitte Quarter =====
During World War I, a hydro electrochemical plant built by the Poudrerie Nationale de Toulouse settled in the Peyrehitte quarter. In 1921, it became the Société des Produits Azotés [nitrogen products company] (SPA). Within its development, the construction of another plant, a producer of aluminium (electro-chemistry), began in 1939. These two plants, although creating jobs, did not cause any significant increase in population (only 500 inhabitants more, between 1906 and 1936). Their workforce, in fact, consisted mainly of locals (who often kept their second job of farming) and foreigners. All the same, it required the construction of a workers' village that was equipped with a chapel, a dining room, a school and a swimming pool, etc. The quarter had a population of almost 600 people in 1943.

==== Vichy regime and internment camp ====
A decree of 6 April 1940, even before the German invasion, prohibited the movement of nomads (Gypsies, fairground, etc.) throughout the metropolitan territory for the duration of the war and imposed house arrest. In 1940, following the German invasion, anti-nomadic racism increased under the Vichy regime and the first "Gypsies" were interned in camps both in the occupied area and the free zone. Both camps would be created in the "free zone" in order to intern nomads: The Saliers camp and the camp of Lannemezan.

At Lannemezan, in April 1941, the prefect of the Hautes-Pyrénées brought together all of the "nomads" of the department on the Plateau de Lannemezan, then enclosed them in a ruined hospital which was guarded by the gendarmerie. The camp was located on a hillside and at the mercy of the elements, like the others it was ill-equipped and unsanitary. Approximately 700 people, which according to the definition of the vichy regime were called "Bohemians" (nomads, fairground people) were interned in the camps, they stayed there until 1946.

===== Metamorphosis of the Demi-Lune quarter =====
The psychiatric hospital was built just before World War II (1938), a barracks, as well as an arsenal (in 1939) in place of the former racecourse in the town. In 1945, it was entrusted to Dr. Henri Ueberschlag. Modern psychiatry, including by rehabilitation through work, made Lannemezan hospital a renowned place throughout the country.

Around it, the Demi-Lune quarter was organized and embellished with a leisure park which welcomed more than 100,000 visitors per year, as well as an 18-hole golf course.

The arsenal, after a period of abandonment, served as a deposit and place of storage from 1948. It expanded greatly during the 1950s, especially with a Mobilising Centre (CM 10) opening in 1951.

The mobile guards barracks became that of a Republican Company of Security (CRS 29) with an adjoining housing estate. The population of Lannemezan then rose to almost 9,000 inhabitants at the end of the 1960s.

===== Evolution of central public spaces =====
The beginning of the 20th century was marked by the burning of the town hall. The former town hall building was rebuilt in 1911 in a Neo-Renaissance style. The fountain which faced the old town hall, on the Place de la République, was dismantled. it was eventually reused to decorate the vicinity of the hospital.

The statue of the Druidess, installed in front of the grain market in 1911, moved on the Place de Foirail in 1926. It replaced the war memorial of Paul Ducuing which stands today on the Esplanade de la Poste. In 1943, it was melted down by the occupying German authorities, in order to recover metals.

During the war, many families from the north and east of the France took refuge in Lannemezan, allowing a doubling of the population. The factories had up to 1,200 employees. Many markets and fairs and thirty cafes made for a bustling city centre.

In 1967, the grain market was demolished to build the functionalist post office and its tree-lined esplanade.

==== The decline (1970–2007) ====
From the 1970s, the oil crisis and the austerity measures forced a decline in industry activity and the decline of the number of their employees. In addition, the reform of the armed forces involved the closure of the arsenal. Only the psychiatric hospital managed to remain, and doubled as a general hospital, an emergency department and maternity (closed in 2009 during the reform of hospitals).

The introduction of the new prison, in 1987, and the renovation of a very large part of the town centre did not prevent the decline of the population, which fell below 6,000 inhabitants at the beginning of the 21st century.

However, the redevelopment of the site of the Alcan plant, closed in 2007–2008, with the opening of the Carbone Savoie and Knauf Insulation factories, associated with many real estate projects (reconstruction of the cité des familles, new subdivisions, etc.) could mean the end of the decline.

== Decorations, distinctions and titles ==
- Obtaining of the Croix de guerre 1939–1945.
- The first town hall present on Second Life.
- Part of the Saint-Jean-Baptiste Church is classified as an historical monument.
- The T1 and T2 tumuli are also classified as historical monuments.

== Politics and administration ==
=== Political trends and results ===
The results with the latest elections, since 2001, are presented in the table below:

==== Presidential Elections ====
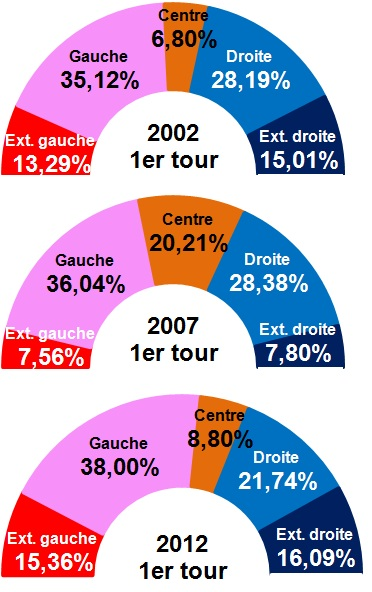
Results dof the first round for the presidential election in Lannemezan, dsince 2002

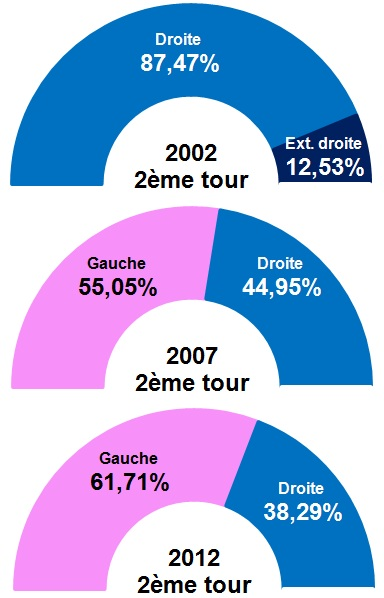
Results of the second round for the presidential election in Lannemezan, since 2002

Election	Round	Winner	Full results	Turnout
2002 French presidential election	1st	23.09% : Lionel Jospin (PS)	19.66% : Jacques Chirac (RPR); 13.56% : Jean-Marie Le Pen (FN); 6.68% : François Bayrou (UDF); 6.10% : Jean Saint-Josse (CPNT); 5.82% : Arlette Laguiller (LO); 5.00% : Noël Mamère (The Greens); 4.65% : Jean-Pierre Chevènement (MDP); 4.03% : Olivier Besancenot (LCR); 3.44% : Robert Hue (PCF); 1.95% : Christiane Taubira (PRG); 1.88% : Alain Madelin (DL); 1.72% : Corinne Lepage (CAP21); 1.45% : Bruno Mégret (MNR); 0.55% : Christine Boutin (FRS); 0.43% : Daniel Gluckstein (PT)	68.61%
2002 French presidential election	2nd	87.47% : Jacques Chirac (RPR)	12.53% : Jean-Marie Le Pen (FN)	78.22%
2007 French presidential election	1st	33.03% : Ségolène Royal (PS)	25.63% : Nicolas Sarkozy (UMP); 20.21% : François Bayrou (UDF); 7.80% : Jean-Marie Le Pen (FN); 3.92% : Olivier Besancenot (LCR); 2.54% : Marie-George Buffet (PCF); 1.47% : Frédéric Nihous (CPNT); 1.28% : Dominique Voynet (The Greens); 1.28% : Philippe de Villiers (MPF); 1.10% : Arlette Laguiller (LO); 1.07% : José Bové (CP); 0.66% : Gérard Schivardi (PT)	85.40%
2007 French presidential election	2nd	55.05% : Ségolène Royal (PS)	44.95% : Nicolas Sarkozy (UMP)	85.82%
2012 French presidential election	1st	36.13% : François Hollande (PS)	20.17% : Nicolas Sarkozy (UMP); 16.09% : Marine Le Pen (FN); 13.55% : Jean-Luc Mélenchon (FDG); 8.80% : François Bayrou (MoDem); 1.57% : Nicolas Dupont-Aignan (DLR); 1.44% : Eva Joly (EELV); 1.34% : Philippe Poutou (NPA); 0.47% : Nathalie Arthaud (LO); 0.40% : Jacques Cheminade (SP)	80.10%
2012 French presidential election	2nd	61.71% : François Hollande (PS)	38.29% : Nicolas Sarkozy (UMP)	80.79%

==== Other elections ====
Election	Round	Winner	Full results	Turnout
2002 French legislative election	2nd	50.07% : Pierre Forgues (PS)	49.93% : Patrick Butor (UMP)	59.98%
2007 French legislative election	2nd	51.00% : Pierre Forgues (PS)	49.00% : Monique Lamon (UMP)	62.69%
2004 European Parliament election	2nd	37.18% : Kader Arif (PS)	17.00% : Jean-Marie Cavada (UDF)	41.42%
2009 European Parliament election	2nd	27.75% : Kader Arif (PS)	24.86% : Dominique Baudis (UMP)	40.97%
2004 French regional elections	2nd	56.59% : Martin Malvy (PS)	32.83% : Jacques Godfrain (UDF)	64.38%
2010 French regional elections	2nd	76.53% : Martin Malvy (PS)	23.47% : Brigitte Barèges (UDF)	53.76%
2008 French cantonal elections	2nd	49.58% : Henri Forges (PS)	36.29% : Marie-Françoise Couput (DVD)	65.12%
2001 French municipal elections	1st	34.76% : Pierre Bleuler (UDF) (unelected)	32.84% : Bernard Plano (DVG)
2001 French municipal elections	2nd	56.43% : Bernard Plano (DVG)	43.57% : Pierre Bleuler (UDF).
2008 French municipal elections	1st	58.95% : Bernard Plano (UG)	21.17% : Marie-Françoise Couput (DVD); 14.82% : Laurent Lages (DVG); 21.17% : Michel Duprat (DVD)	79.60%
2005 French European Constitution referendum:	–	53.82% : No	46.18% : Yes	71.19%
French Socialist Party presidential primary, 2011	1st	48.78% for François Hollande	22.86% : Martine Aubry; 14.94% : Arnaud Montebourg; 6.10% : Ségolène Royal; 4.88% : Manuel Valls; 2.44% : Jean-Michel Baylet
French Socialist Party presidential primary, 2011	2nd	64.26% for François Hollande	35.74% for Martine Aubry
2014 French municipal elections	1st	65.32% : Bernard Plano (PS)	34.67% : Laurent Lages (DVG)	70.14%

=== List of mayors ===
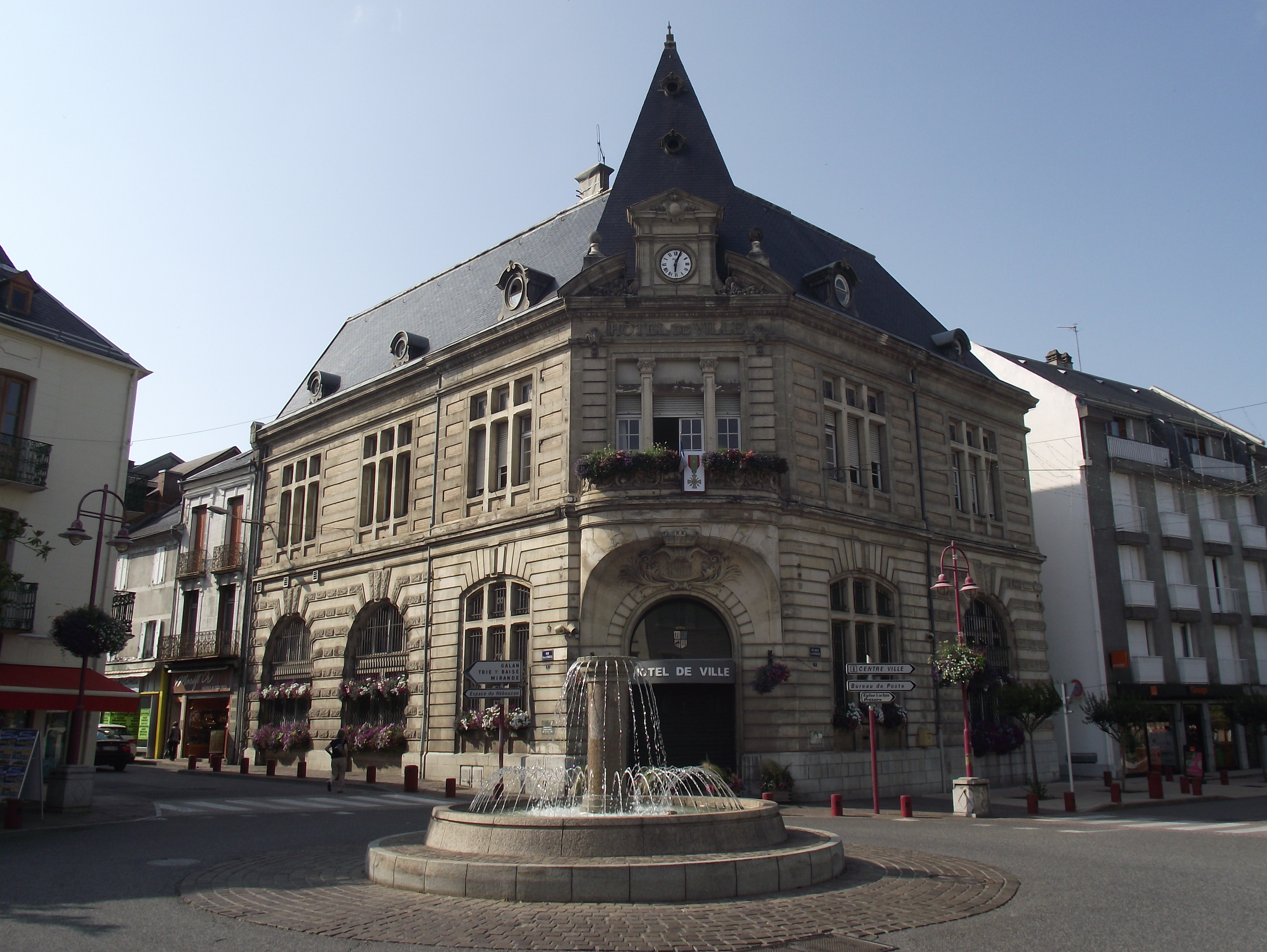
The town hall

Since 1939, Lannemezan has had only four mayors:

List of mayors of Lannemezan
Start	End	Name	Party	Other details
1939	1966	Paul Baratgin	Radical Left Republican RGR	Senator
1966	1977	François Sarrat	Radical Socialist	Entrepreneur, senator
1977	2001	Pierre Bleuler	UDF	Medical doctor, député
2001	In progress	Bernard Plano	PS	Engineer

=== Arrangement of the municipal council ===
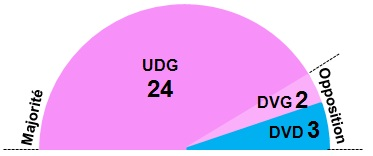
Formation of the municipal council of Lannemezan, from 2008

The municipal election of 2008 took place in a single round. Four lists were present:

- The outgoing mayor was Bernard Plano (PS-UG) who got 58.95% of the votes (i.e. 1710 of 2901)
- Marie-Françoise Couput (DVD) who won 21.17% of the votes (614 votes)
- Laurent Lages (DVG) who got 14.82% of the votes (430 votes)
- Michel Duprat who got 5.07% of the votes (147 votes)

Below is the sharing of the seats in the municipal council of Lannemezan, following the municipal elections in 2008:

Party	Leader	Seats	Status
UG	Bernard Plano	24	Majority
DVD	Marie-Françoise Couput	3	Opposition
DVG	Laurent Lages	2	Opposition

=== Judicial and administrative authorities ===
The city has a municipal police service, a police station and a courthouse which was closed as part of the Dati reform. The city depends on the Court of Appeal and the Administrative Court of Pau.

The Lannemezan prison centre, was built in 1987. Georges Ibrahim Abdallah, a Lebanese communist militant, is serving a life sentence there for complicity in murder.

=== Agglomeration community ===
Location of the Communauté de communes du Plateau de Lannemezan within Hautes-Pyrénées

The town of Lannemezan is the seat of the Communauté de communes du Plateau de Lannemezan, that consists of 57 communes.

=== Twinning ===
Lannemezan is twinned with:

- Tondela, Portugal since 1995

== Population and society ==
=== Demography ===
==== Demographic evolution ====
In 2023, the commune had 5,811 inhabitants, making it the second most populous commune in the arrondissement of Bagnères-de-Bigorre and the fifth most populous commune in Hautes-Pyrénées.

Historical population

Year	Pop.	±% p.a.
1793	779	—
1800	841	+1.10%
1806	1,411	+9.01%
1821	1,411	+0.00%
1831	1,243	−1.26%
1836	1,302	+0.93%
1841	1,408	+1.58%
1846	1,563	+2.11%
1851	1,604	+0.52%
1856	1,570	−0.43%
1861	1,607	+0.47%
1866	1,602	−0.06%
1872	1,772	+1.70%

Year	Pop.	±% p.a.
1876	1,839	+0.93%
1881	1,859	+0.22%
1886	2,379	+5.06%
1891	1,872	−4.68%
1896	1,794	−0.85%
1901	2,023	+2.43%
1906	2,069	+0.45%
1911	1,913	−1.56%
1921	2,035	+0.62%
1926	2,305	+2.52%
1931	2,569	+2.19%
1936	2,529	−0.31%
1946	5,095	+7.26%

Year	Pop.	±% p.a.
1954	5,308	+0.51%
1962	7,378	+4.20%
1968	8,680	+2.75%
1975	8,385	−0.49%
1982	7,362	−1.84%
1990	6,704	−1.16%
1999	6,137	−0.98%
2007	5,762	−0.79%
2012	5,906	+0.49%
2017	5,837	−0.23%
2023	5,811	−0.07%

From 1962 to 1999: Population without double counting; for the years following: municipal population.
Source: EHESS and INSEE

=== Education ===
Lannemezan is part of the Academy of Toulouse. All of the establishments in the town are summarised in the table below.

==== Nursery and primary schools ====
Since the closure of the Groupe Scolaire de la Demi-Lune at the beginning of the 21st century due to lack of staff, four school groups are present in the city.

- Paul-Baratgin School Group, Rue des Écoles.
- Las Moulias School Group, Cité des Bans.
- Des Bourtoulets School Group, Boulevard des Tilleuls.
- Guérissa School Group, Rue de la Lande Boc.

==== Secondary ====
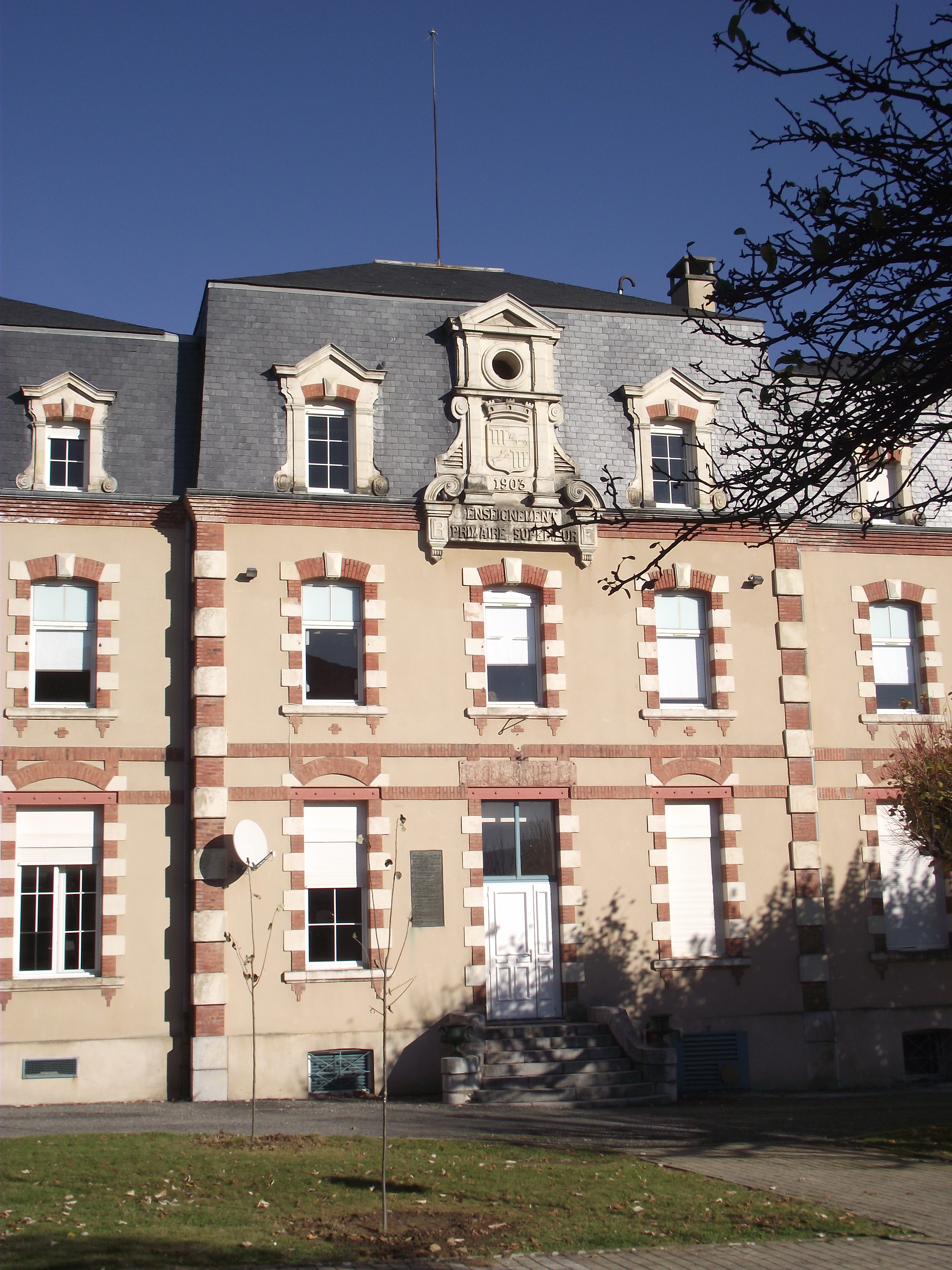
Lycée Michelet

- College Gaston Fébus, 101 Rue de la Cité Scolaire. This is a boarding school and offers a general education and Segpa. Teaching languages: English, Spanish, Occitan and Latin. Sports sections: Rugby
- Michelet general education lycée, Rue du Stade. Sections S, ES and L, the school has a boarding school and specialised sports sections: Ski and Snowboard. It offers other options such as ancient languages (Latin) and regional languages (Occitan) and the Spanish European section.

Website: ENT

==== Specialised education ====
- Centre de formation professionnelle et de promotion agricole [Centre for vocational training and agricultural promotion] (FPAFC), Chemin du Bidalet, agricultural education.

==== University life ====
The town of Lannemezan lacks institutions for higher education. However, academic centres are present near the town: Tarbes, Auch, Pau and Toulouse.

The nearest centre, namely that of Tarbes, has significant specialised training, such as a nursing school, many IUT and BTS, an IUFM, a faculty of physics-chemistry belonging to the Paul Sabatier University in Toulouse, a school of ceramics, a STAPS and for CPGE (preparatory classes to the Grandes Ecoles), PC, PT and commerce sections for economy and social. There is also an important school of engineers, ENIT (National School of engineers of Tarbes which belongs to the INP in Toulouse: National Polytechnic Institute). This centre concentrates approximately 5,000 students.

=== Cultural events and festivities ===
Lannemezan is the main location of numerous festivals and events throughout the year.

==== The festival of Saint Jean ====
The festival of Saint Jean, taking place in late June for five days (from Friday to Tuesday) annually attracts many people, and allows the animation of the entire town, thanks to the many events offered. Fireworks, concerts in all corners of the town, disco entertainment or musette following into the evening, many rides for children or excitement for those bigger, with activities offered by different associations, such as horse races or the demonstration by the firefighters of the plateau. This annual festival is launched with the famous fire of Saint Jean, which takes place in a different area each year.

==== Markets ====
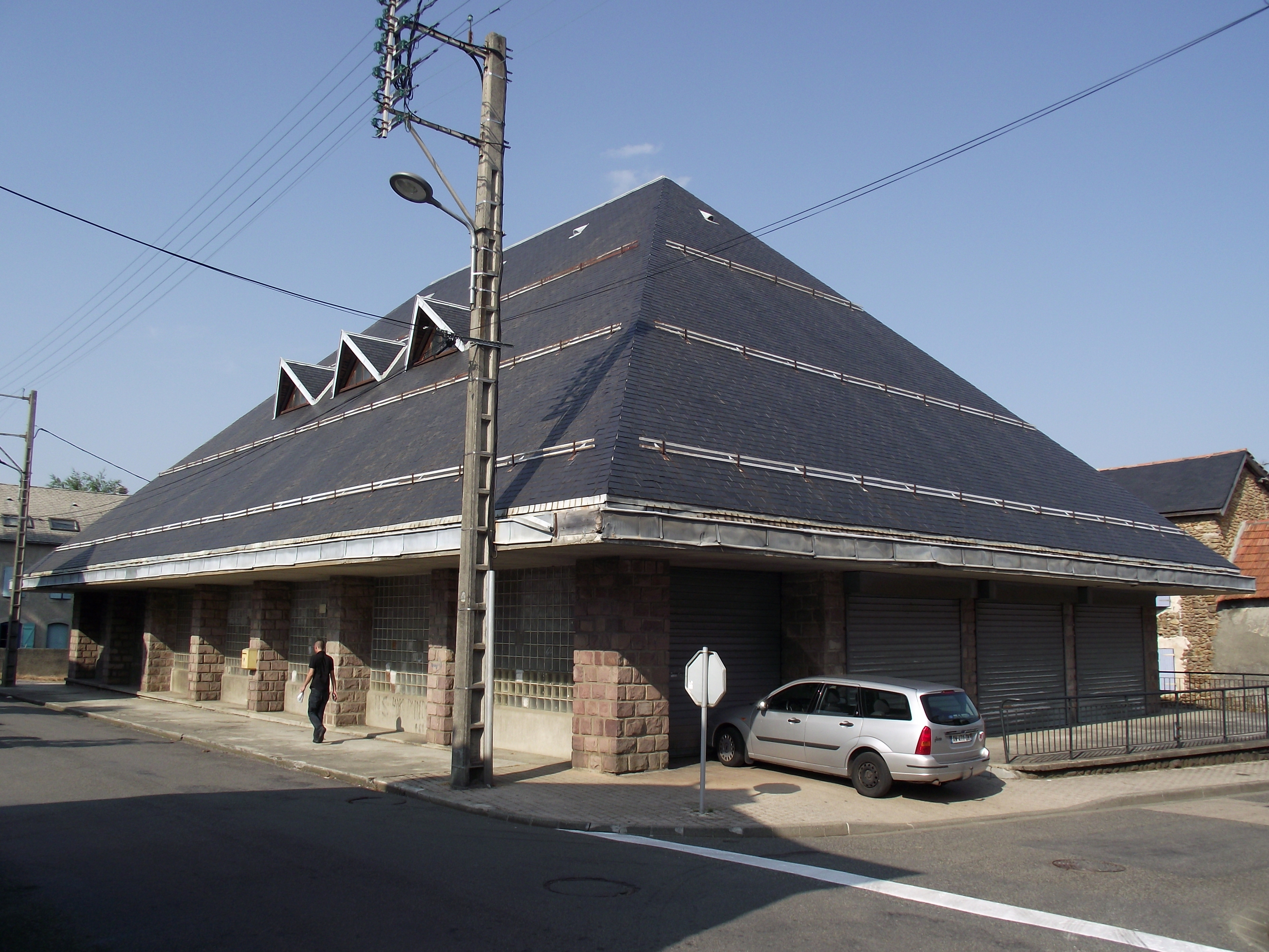
The covered vegetable market

The weekly market takes place every Wednesday morning until early afternoon and attracts many merchants who sometimes come from very far away to Lannemezan. This market is located in the streets of the town centre, around the church and the Place du Château, as well as in the covered market hall with vegetables of the Nébouzan.

During the summer, night markets are organised by the town. These allow tourists and residents to discover local crafts and the many typical gastronomic specialties of the region.

==== The annual festival of theatre ====
Created in 2003 by the town hall, the inter-Pyrénéan meetings of theatre are the highlight of the Lannemezan cultural year. Benefitting from the prestigious patronage of Marcel Maréchal, the founder of Tréteaux de France, they aim to both to enrich the offerings of theatre proposed year-round for the people of Lannemezan, to foster local and regional development and to participate in the summer activities of the commune. Initially scheduled in July, these meetings are, since 2006, held in September to better involve schools and the Lannemezan people returning from holiday.

==== Other events ====
- The comedy festival.
- Many fairs and flea markets are held throughout the year. Also, theatre, outdoor concerts and indoors, especially of the nationally recognised Harmonie municipale de Lannemezan.

=== Health ===
- Central Hospital: This is one of the largest employers in the Hautes-Pyrénées department, which provides the following services:

- Medicine, surgery and emergencies
- Mental health (adult and child psychiatry)
- Geriatric and elderly service
- Medico-social, disability rehabilitation
- A medical technology floor

The establishment, then called the Hôpital Psychiatrique de Lannemezan [Lannemezan Psychiatric Hospital] (HPL), was built in 1937 on the site of Lannemezan. Meanwhile, in 1975, a local clinic of the plateau, located in Lannemezan, was integrated to the hospital. The medical, surgical and emergency services were installed on the hospital site of Lannemezan in very modern premises built in 1991, referred to as the Medico-Surgical Centre.

- Alcoholism centre: Les chemins de la lande, opened in 1999.
- Radiology Centre: Situated in the Peyrehitte area.
- Retirement home: Les Fougères, opened at the end of the 1990s.
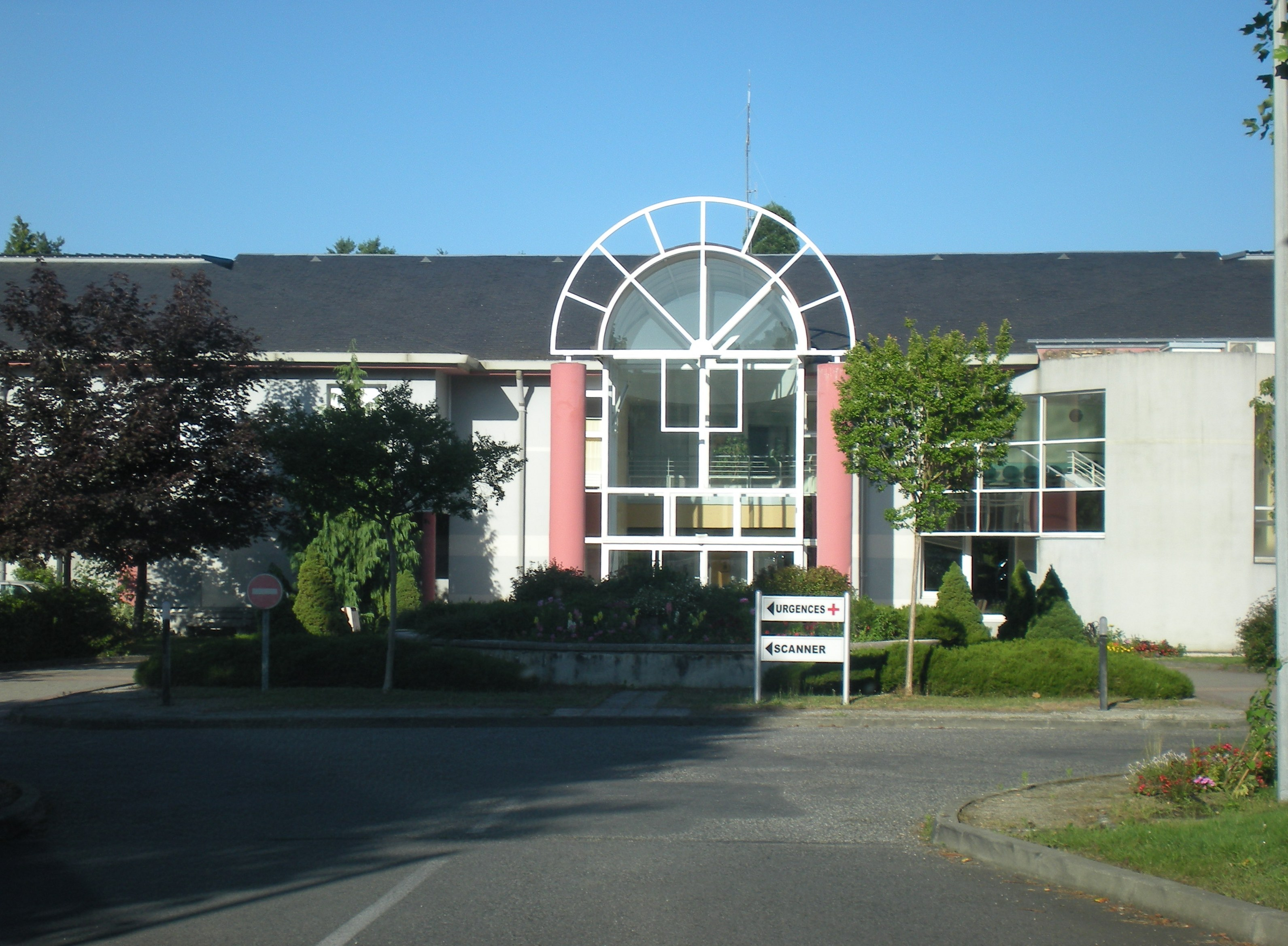
Lannemezan Hospital

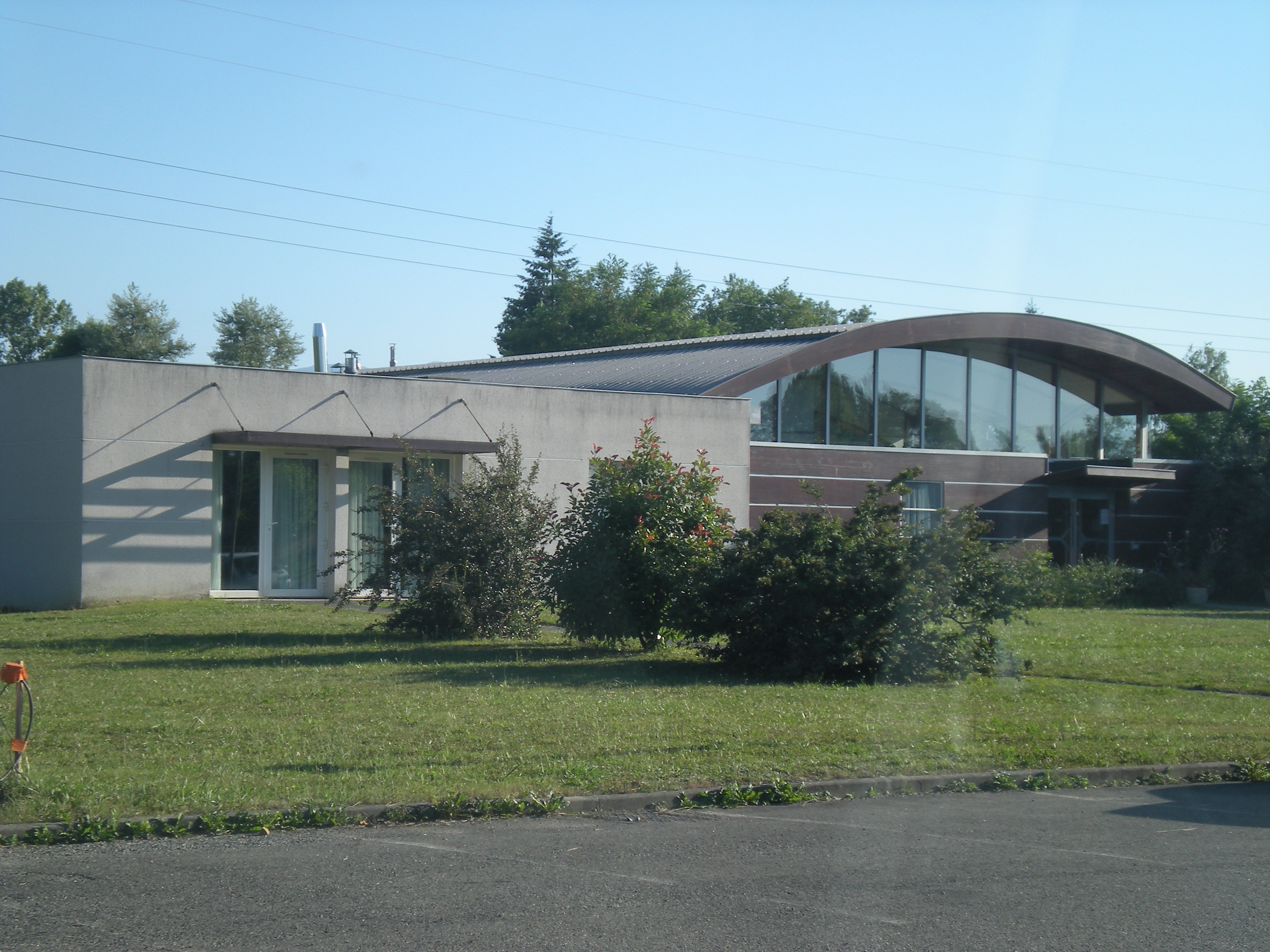
Alcoholism centre of Les chemins de la Lande

=== Sport ===
==== Sports facilities ====
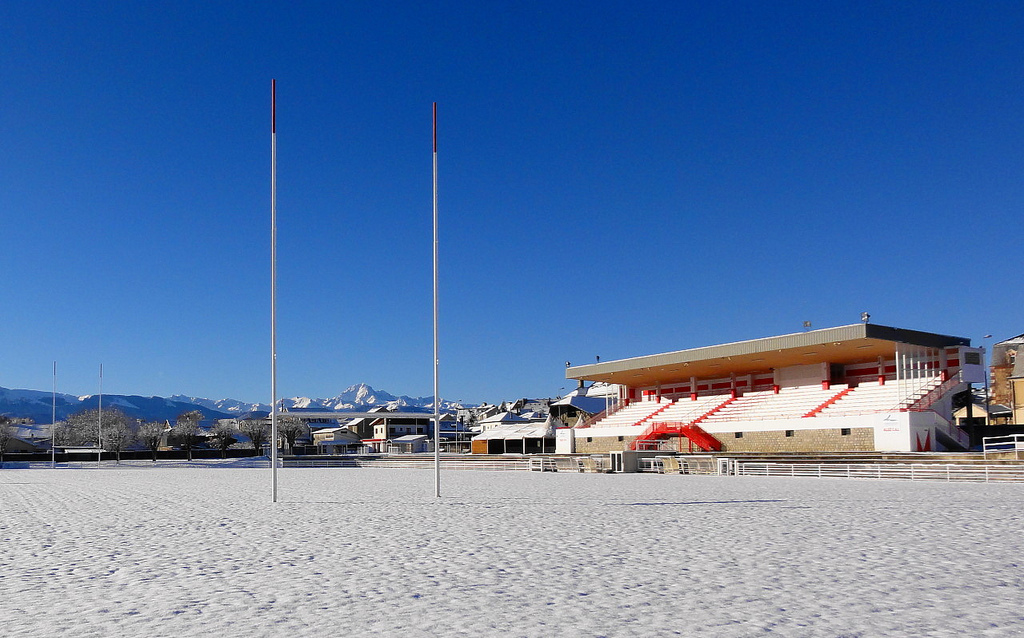
The stadium

- François-Sarrat Stadium (Rugby union, tennis, pelota, athletics), Rue du Stade. It consists of two fields, one with a grandstand (for the CAL) and surrounded by an athletics track, and another for training teams; four tennis courts; a fronton for the practice of Basque pelota and pala.
- Bourtoulets Stadium (football), Boulevard des Tilleuls, with grandstand and two training stadia.
- The Nébouzan sports complex (judo, aikido, basketball, gymnastics, pétanque, skateboarding), space of Nébouzan, Rue Montaigne. Consisting of a bowling space, a martial arts room with tatami mats, a room for gymnastics, a room with markings for basketball and a street park.
- Municipal gymnasium (handball), Rue du 4 septembre
- Municipal swimming pool (swimming, water aerobics), Rue des Moulins. Pool of 25 metres (82 ft), with a gradual depth of 0.8 to 2 metres (2 ft 7 in to 6 ft 7 in), with four lanes.
- Equestrian centre and racecourse (horse riding), Route d'Auch.
- Lannemezan Golf (golf), Rue du Dr H. Ueberschalag. An 18-hole course in the heart of the forest of Pinas Lannemezan, on the edge of the Canal de la Neste, the Gers and the Save.

==== Sport in the town ====
===== Different sports in the town =====
Many sports can be practised in clubs in Lannemezan.

- Rugby union: CA Lannemezan, (Fédérale 1, 3rd division), several times champions of France: Fédérale 1 (2009), Fédérale 3 (2004), Nationale B (1997), Cadets (1975). Several club-trained players have had a national or international career as players or coaches. Among them, Pierre Berbizier, champion of France with the Cadet team in 1975, 56 caps in the national team, then successive coach of the Italian national team and Racing-Metro; Philippe Berbizier, coach of Tarbes and Mont de Marsan; Philippe Bérot, developed in Lannemezan, Tarbes, coach then joint coach of the Italy team.
- Football: Football-Club du Plateau (District)
- Handball: Pays des Nestes Handball (Prenational)
- Volleyball: Volleyball Lannemezanais
- Basketball: Lannemezan BasketèClub
- Judo: Judojo Lannemezan
- Karate: Lannemezan Karaté-Club
- Aikido: Dojo of the Plateau
- Cycling: Vélo-Club Lannemezan [Lannemezan Cycling Club], Union Cyclotouriste du Plateau
- Tennis: Tennis-Club of Lannemezan
- Badminton: Lannemezan badminton Club
- Table tennis: Lannemezan Tennis de Table
- Archery: Les Archers Bandouliers
- Basque pelota: Eskualduna

===== Organisation of sporting events =====
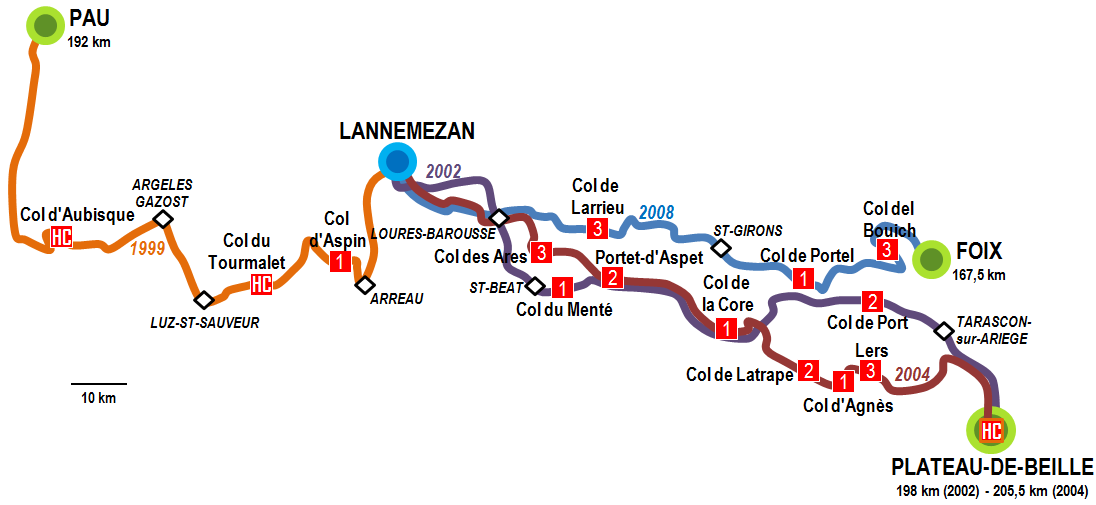
Routes of stages of the Tour de France having Lannemezan as the departure town

Lannemezan has, up to now, hosted a stage of the Tour de France five times.

	Year	Quality	Stage	Winner
1	1999 Tour de France	Departure town	16th stage: Lannemezan – Pau; 192 kilometres (119 mi)	(Spain) David Etxebarria
2	2002 Tour de France	Departure town	12th stage: Lannemezan – Plateau de Beille; 198 kilometres (123 mi)	(United States) Lance Armstrong; Victory annulled
3	2004 Tour de France	Departure town	13th stage: Lannemezan – Plateau de Beille; 205 kilometres (127 mi)	(United States) Lance Armstrong; Victory annulled
4	2008 Tour de France	Departure town	11th stage: Lannemezan – Foix; 167.5 kilometres (104.1 mi)	(Norway) Kurt Asle Arvesen
5	2015 Tour de France	Departure town	12th stage: Lannemezan – Plateau de Beille; 195 kilometres (121 mi)	(Spain) Joaquim Rodríguez

Lannemezan has also hosted the Tour des Pyrénées cycle race several times.

=== Media ===
Information bulletins, published by the commune, were created and sent to residents during the first term of office of the current PS mayor of the commune, Bernard Plano. These bulletins are also associated to newsletters published by the Communauté de communes du Plateau de Lannemezan.

Radio Festival Lannemezan, a Lannemezan radio station also made its appearance, on 95FM Radio Festival. Radio Festival Lannemezan is under the supervision of the association of Festival D'Énergie du Plateau. The association which was aimed at the creation of a local radio station, was established in 2002. Radio Festival was initially a temporary radio. Since August 2006, it received the authority to operate a permanent radio. First installed on the premises of another radio (RDC) in the Comminges, after a few setbacks, it returned to Lannemezan and began broadcasting on 16 November 2007 with a brand new team of volunteers. The headquarters is still town hall of Lannemezan, with the studio on Rue Alphonse Couget and transmitter on the water tower of the CM 10. This enables coverage over all of the Plateau de Lannemezan with a 30 kilometres (19 mi) radius. Since late 2007, Radio Festival only works with volunteers (a dozen) and is financed by advertising, a few community grants, benefit evenings and activities, and the membership fees and donations. The objective is the promotion of the territory and the people who live there (companies, traders, elected representatives, associations, population). It has an obligation to issue at least four hours of programming on Lannemezan and the Plateau every day, through information flashes, meetings, and direct. It operates 24 hours a day. The station can be listened to, from across the world, through the website: radiofestival-lannemezan.fr.

A public computer space has been created in Lannemezan, first located at Rue Alsace-Lorraine, it was transferred to the Espace Paul Bert to allow more computers to be available, all for free.

DTT has been available at Lannemezan since its inception, thanks to the transmitter of the Pic du Midi de Bigorre. Internet ADSL broadband is available in the commune, and a fibre optic project is underway which is away from the autoroute.

=== Worship ===
Catholic worship can be practiced in the commune, two places of worship are present: The Chapel of Bourtoulets and the Church of Saint John the Baptist.

== Economy ==
=== Employment ===
The unemployment rate in Lannemezan was 16.3% of the active population (between 15 and 64 years old) in 2017, which is higher than the national average (13.9%). The activity rate of people between 15 and 64 years old was lower in Lannemezan (63.4%) than the national average (74.0%). The employment by sector of activity is shown in the table below:

Sector	Agriculture	Industry	Construction	Tertiary	Public services
Lannemezan	0.6%	16.5%	3.7%	27.3%	51.9%
National average	2.6%	12.1%	6.4%	46.6%	32.3%

=== Income of the population and taxation ===
The average income per household in Lannemezan amounts to €17,312 per year (statistics based on 2007 revenues). Departmental average: €18,506, national average: €21,930. Lannemezan ranks as 237th commune of the 465 communes classified in the department. By comparison, the following departmental statistics are available:

Average incomes observed in Lannemezan compared with the other communes of the Hautes-Pyrénées

Rank	Commune	Population	Average income
1	Visker	331 inhabitants	€30,344/yr
2	Gensac	68 inhabitants	€30,052/yr
3	Molère	30 inhabitants	€29,984/yr
4	Boulin	280 inhabitants	€29,952/yr
5	Horgues	1,218 inhabitants	€29,153/yr
6	Odos	3,518 inhabitants	€28,587/yr
	National average	65,073,482 inhabitants	€21,930/yr
126	Argelès-Gazost	3,254 inhabitants	€19,740/yr
135	Aureilhan	7,786 inhabitants	€19,370/yr
	Departmental average	234,666 inhabitants	€18,506/yr
237	Lannemezan	5,824 inhabitants	€17,311/yr
245	Bagnères-de-Bigorre	8,790 inhabitants	€17,152/yr
250	Vic-en-Bigorre	5,003 inhabitants	€17,068/yr
274	Lourdes	16,150 inhabitants	€16,732/yr
292	Tarbes	49,194 inhabitants	€16,431/yr
463	Thuy	14 inhabitants	€9,681/yr
464	Escots	36 inhabitants	€8,573/yr
465	Esconnets	28 inhabitants	€7,621/yr

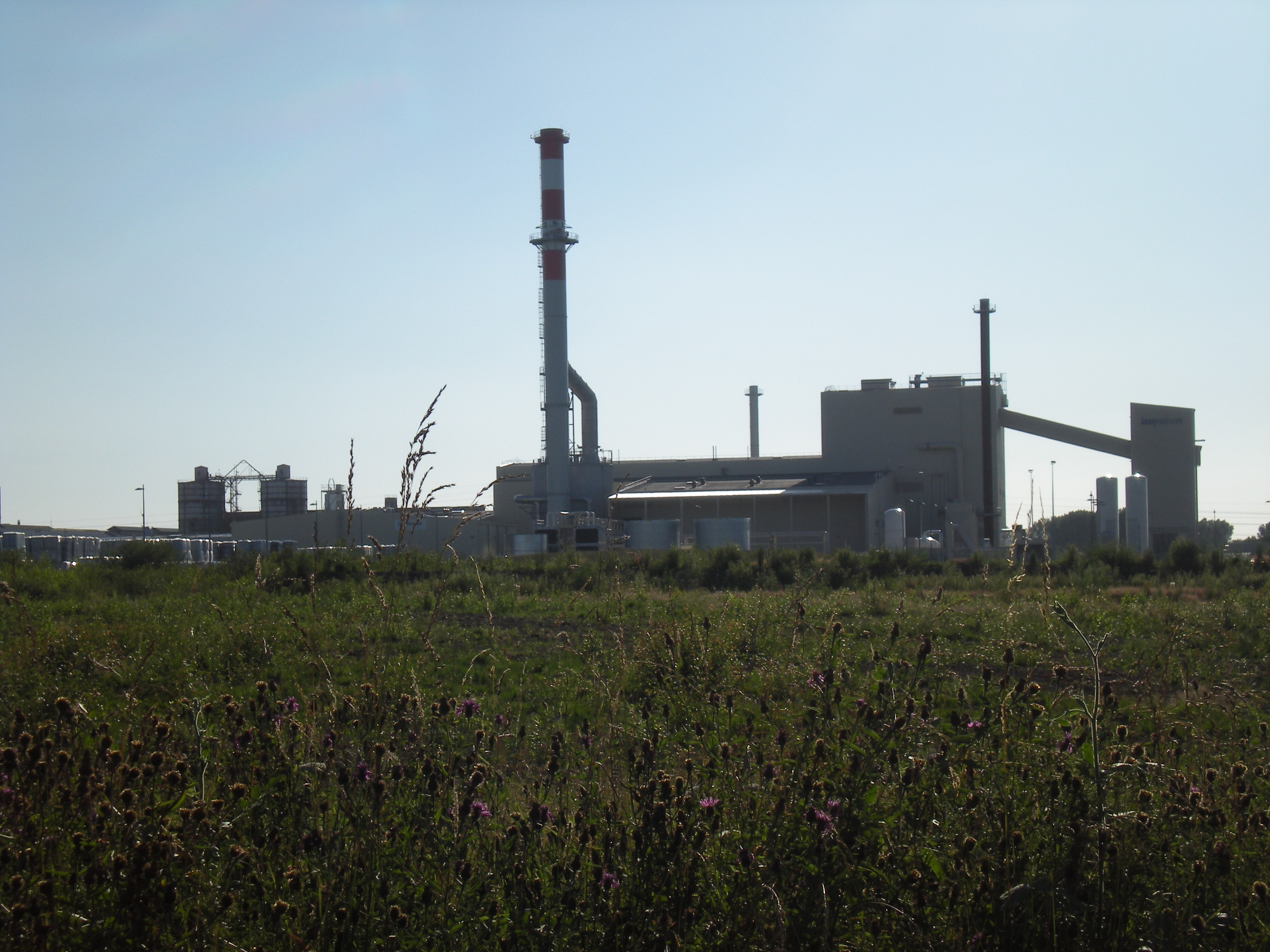
Knauf Insulation factory, Peyrehitte industrial area

=== Agriculture ===
Lannemezan presents an important rural area, on which is practiced mixed farming:

- Polyculture with cereal crops and pastures.
- Bovine, porcine, ovine and equine farms (heavy horses).
- Presence of an agricultural cooperative and a slaughterhouse.

Many events in connection with these agricultural activities are held throughout the year in the town:

- Ash Wednesday in February
- The regional sheep competition in March
- The Regional Fair of August
- The Fair of Saint Catherine in December

=== Commerce ===
- The Peyrehitte Commercial Zone grown since 2006 at the south of the town.
- The Peyrehicade Commercial Zone at the west entrance of the city, on the communes of Capvern and Campistrous.
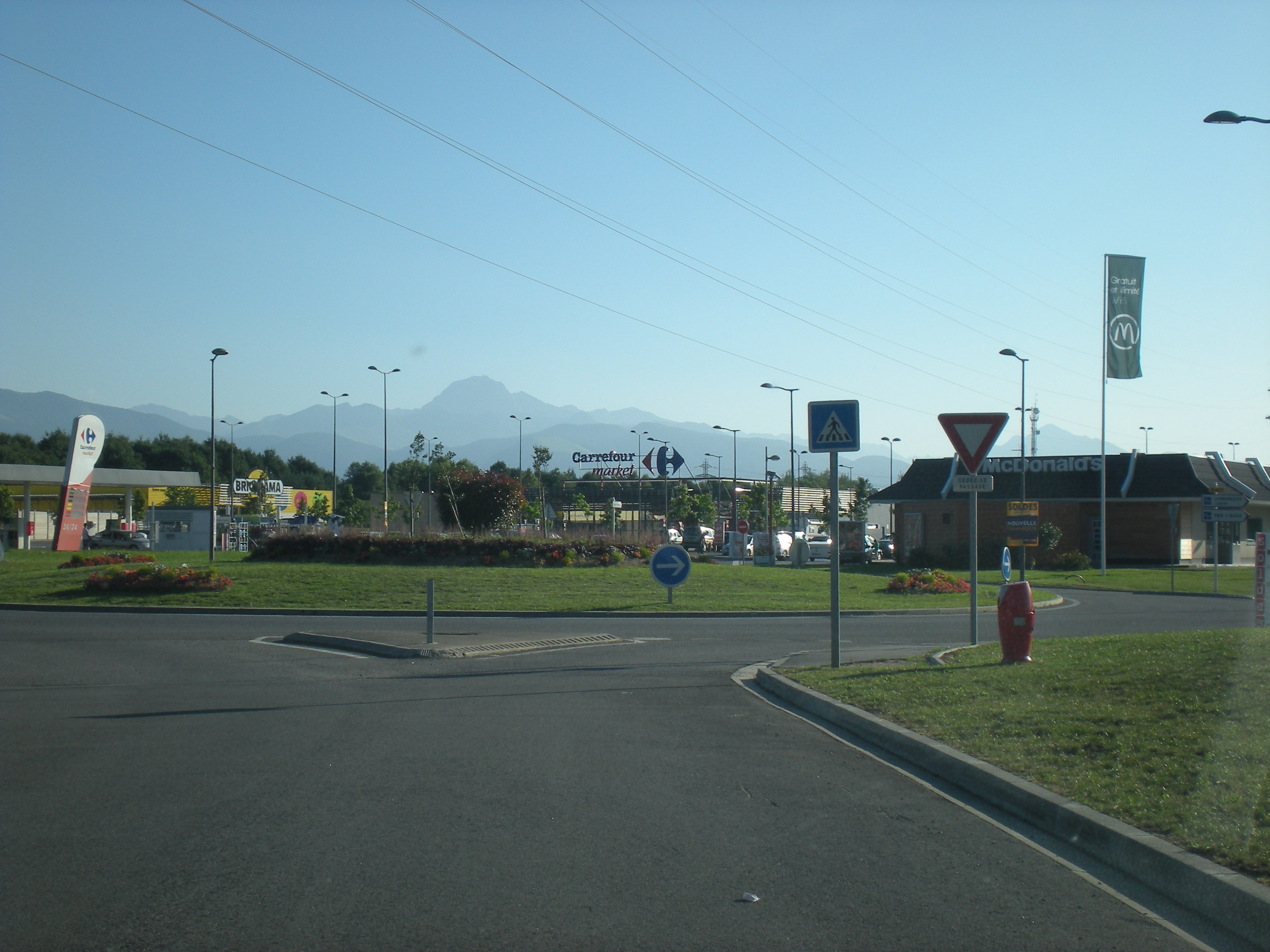
The commercial area of Ramondia, south of the city

=== Tourism ===
Lannemezan is located at a crossroads between sea and mountains, and thus represents a place of inescapable passage. The commune has four hotels, which have a capacity of 104 rooms (67 classified as 2-star, 37 classified as 1-star).

A construction project in the Peyrehitte Industrial Zone should've led to the opening of a hotel in 2009. This project, launched by Brit Hotel was to lead to the construction of a 3-star hotel of 69 rooms, but seems to have been abandoned as a result of the economic crisis.

== Local culture and heritage ==
=== Religious heritage ===
The Saint-Jean-Baptiste Church is a Gothic church with an extended Romanesque nave (19th century), apse (15th century), portal (13th century), recorded capitals, and an unfinished bell tower (19th century). This building was included in the inventory of historical monuments on 24 October 1945, the two candlesticks of Easter were classified in the inventory of historical monuments on 26 April 1976 and the altarpiece as well as the tabernacle of the high altar were classified on 7 July 1995.

The chapel of the Bourtoulets.

The wood of the Culassou houses a statue of the Virgin Mary.

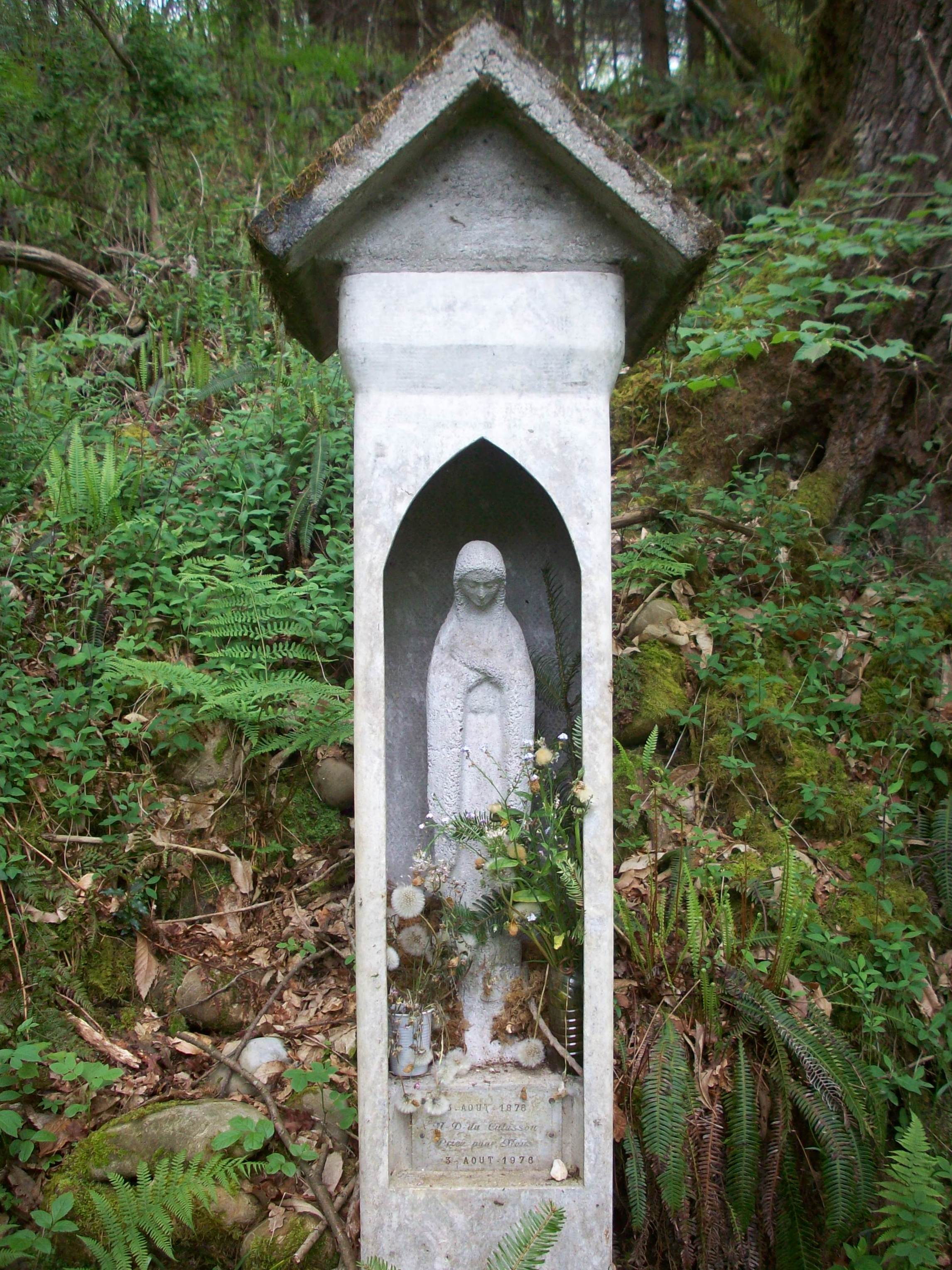
Virgin Mary of the Culassou Wood

=== Civil heritage ===
==== Public spaces ====
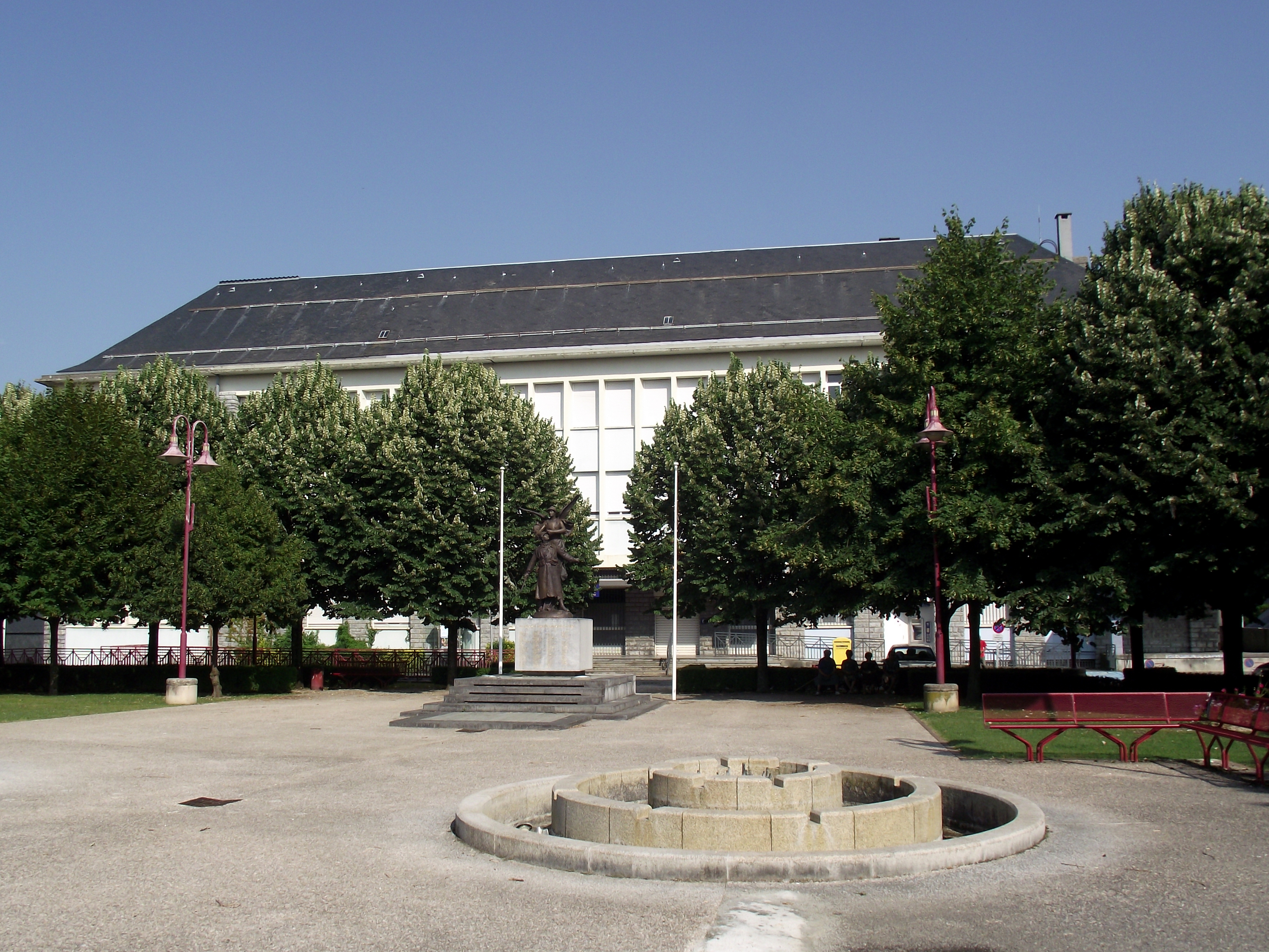
The Place de la République

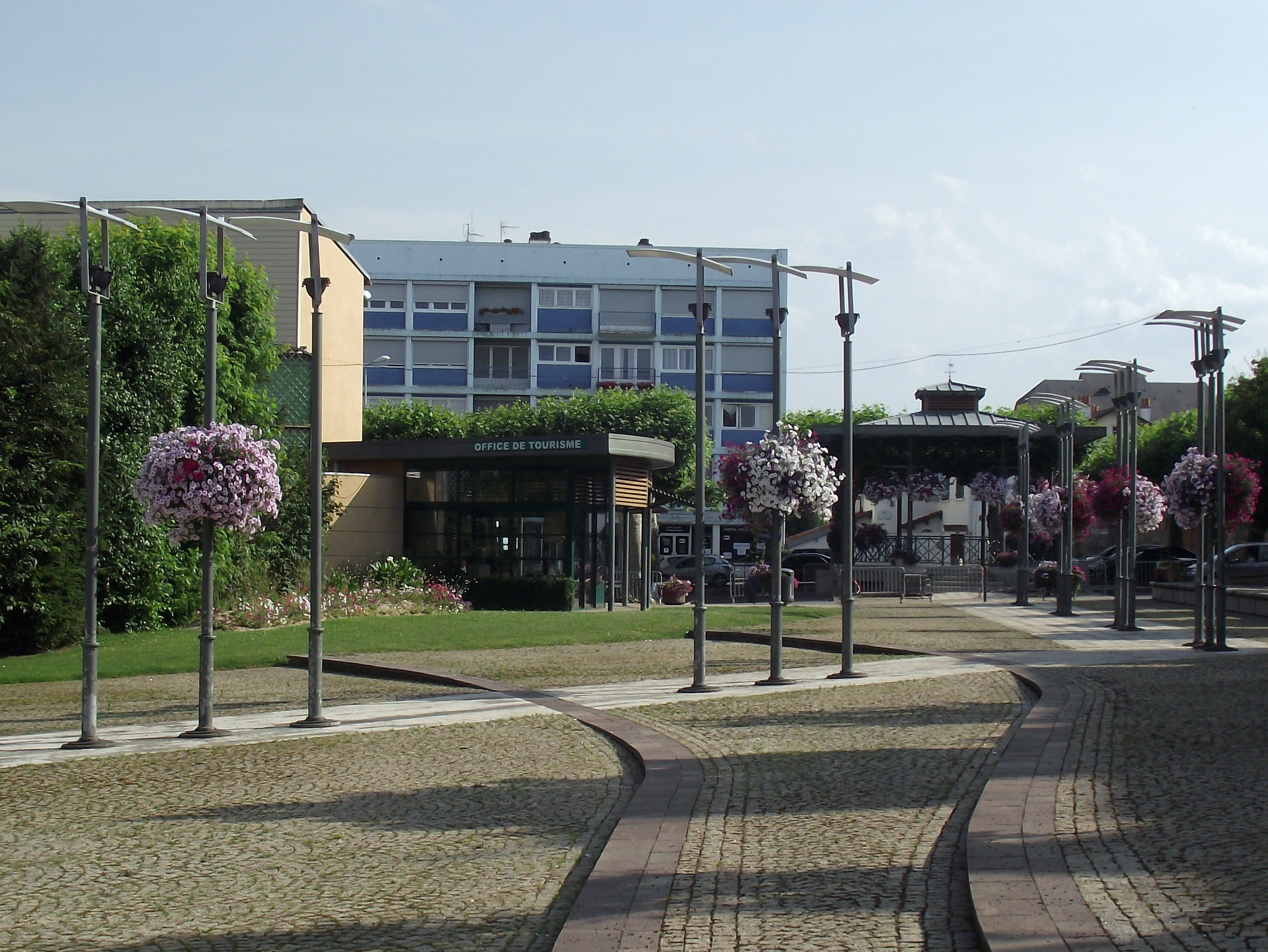
The Place des Droits de l'Homme et du Citoyen

Lannemezan has numerous tree-lined squares. The Place de l'hotel de ville [Town Hall Square] is, with its fountain, more modest. A monumental post office overlooking the Place de la République and its war memorial. The tourist office runs along a pathway leading to a large bandstand on the Place des Droits de l'Homme et du Citoyen [Square of the rights of man and of the citizen]. The Place du Château has a large car parking area near the still active market. The market of the Place de la Volaille was transformed into a tea room.

The town has the distinction of counting several war memorials one of which, work of the Russian Bernarovitch Feinberg, was the unfortunate gift from Rothschild in 1921. It struck the local pride and a new monument to relegate it was erected in 1925, shortly after the political defeat of the baron. It was the work of the sculptor of the Druidess, Paul Ducuing.

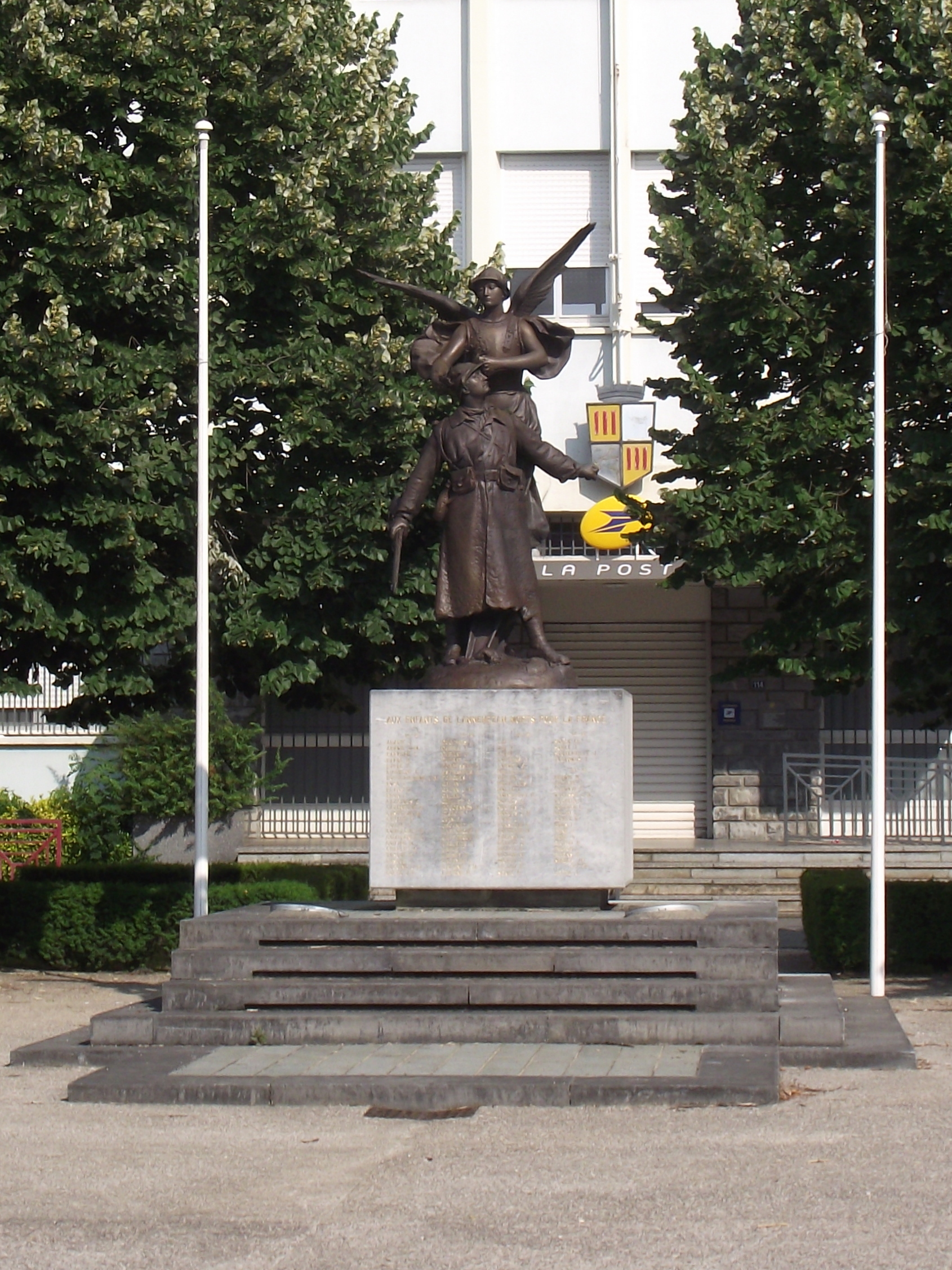
The communal war memorial

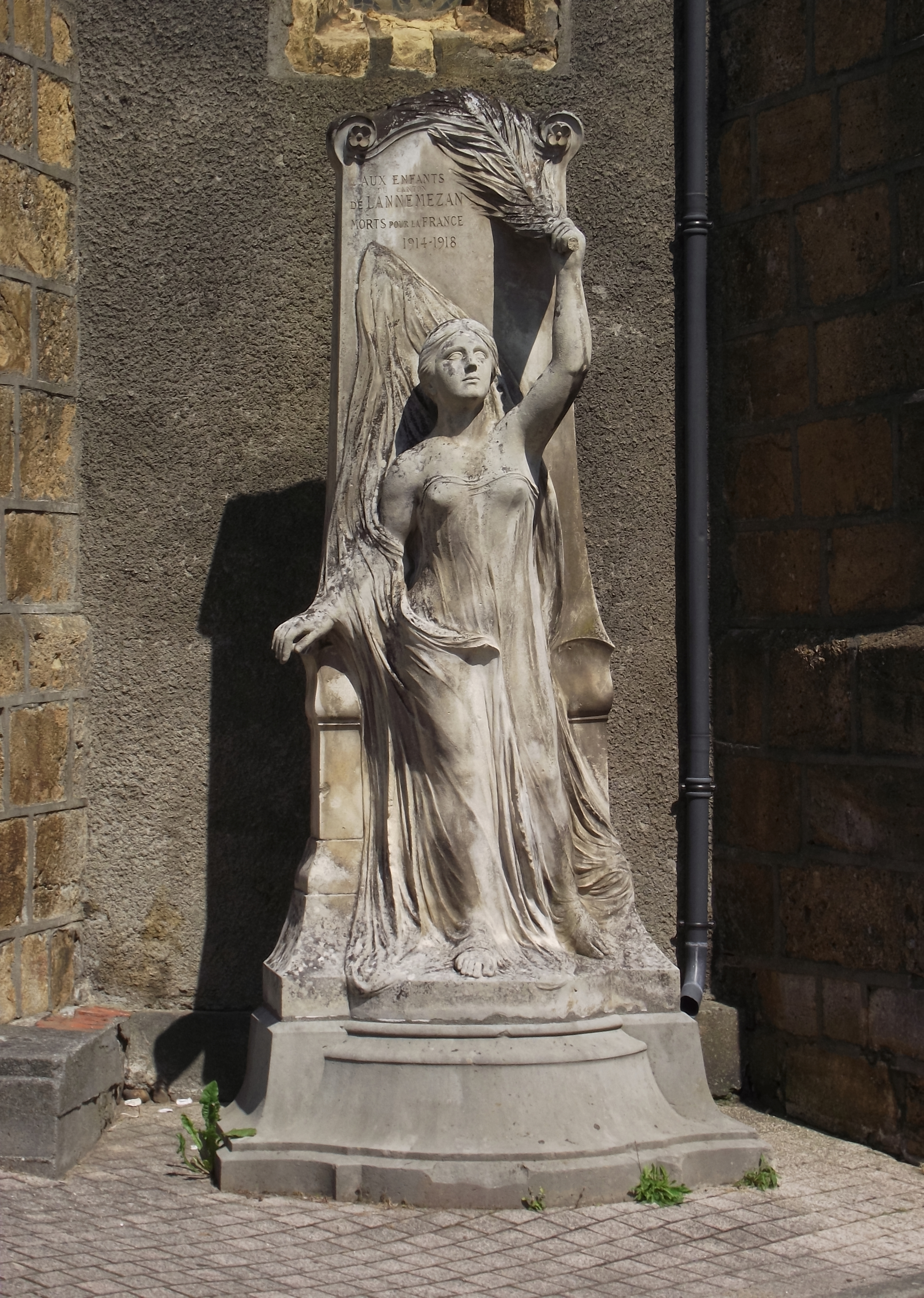
The Rothschild war memorial

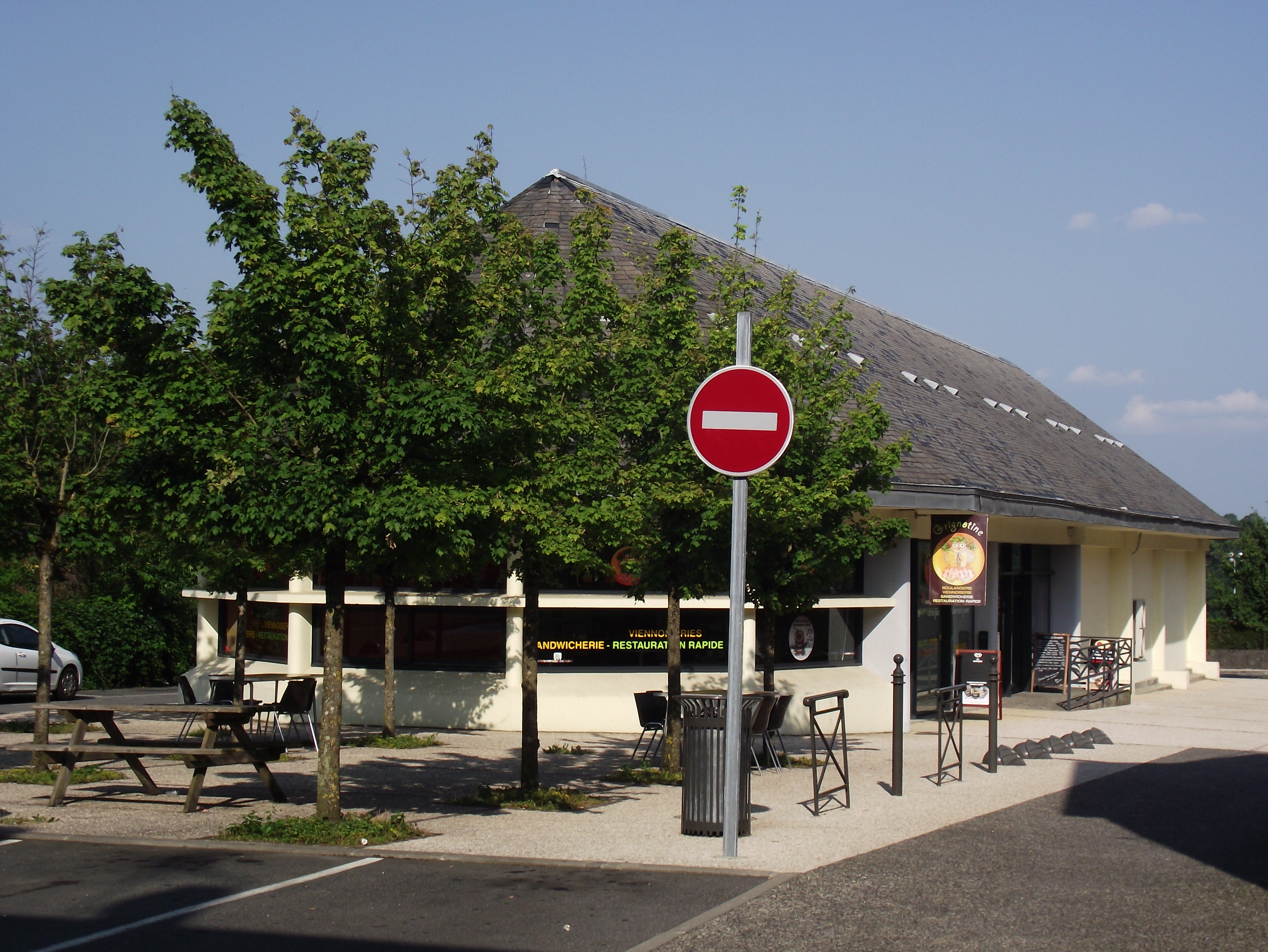
The Place de la Volaille

==== Remarkable houses ====
- The Château Barbé, near the Peyrehicade locality and the Canal de la Neste, was built by Benjamin Barbé (1818–1893), General Councillor of the Hautes Pyrénées (1875), professor, writer and journalist. Founder in 1873 the l'Abeille journal published in Tarbes every Sunday. He died at Château Barbé in 1893.

==== Archaeological remains ====
- The T1 and T2 tumuli located at a place called Puzo Pelat, property of the commune, dating from the Iron Age and the Bronze Age. This archaeological site was inscribed as an historic monument on 6 January 1971.

==== Environmental and floral heritage ====
- The most floral town of the department, for six consecutive years (classification of the General Council for the cities of the plain of more than 5,000 inhabitants), Lannemezan has many green spaces present in the city: especially square of the Paul Baratgin school and the wood of the resistance fighters (or Wood of the Plantade).
- The Bois de la Plantade [Wood of the Plantade] situated in the Le Guérissa locality on an area of 8 hectares (20 acres), long left abandoned, has been reborn today thanks to an extensive rehabilitation program conducted between 2004 and 2006 by the city with the assistance of the ONF and the Fishermen of the Plateau de Lannemezan.
- The Demi-Lune leisure park consists of 18 hectares (44 acres) bordered by forests with flowing canals derived from the Gers with the Pic du Midi de Bigorre visible in the distance. The park consists of a large central lake, many games (mini golf, pedal boats, etc.), vast green spaces inhabited by several species of exotic animals, as well as numerous statues and figurines which tell the tales of Perrault. This park attracts over 150,000 visitors each year.
- The family gardens were inaugurated in 2010, near the prison on the Rue des Saligues.
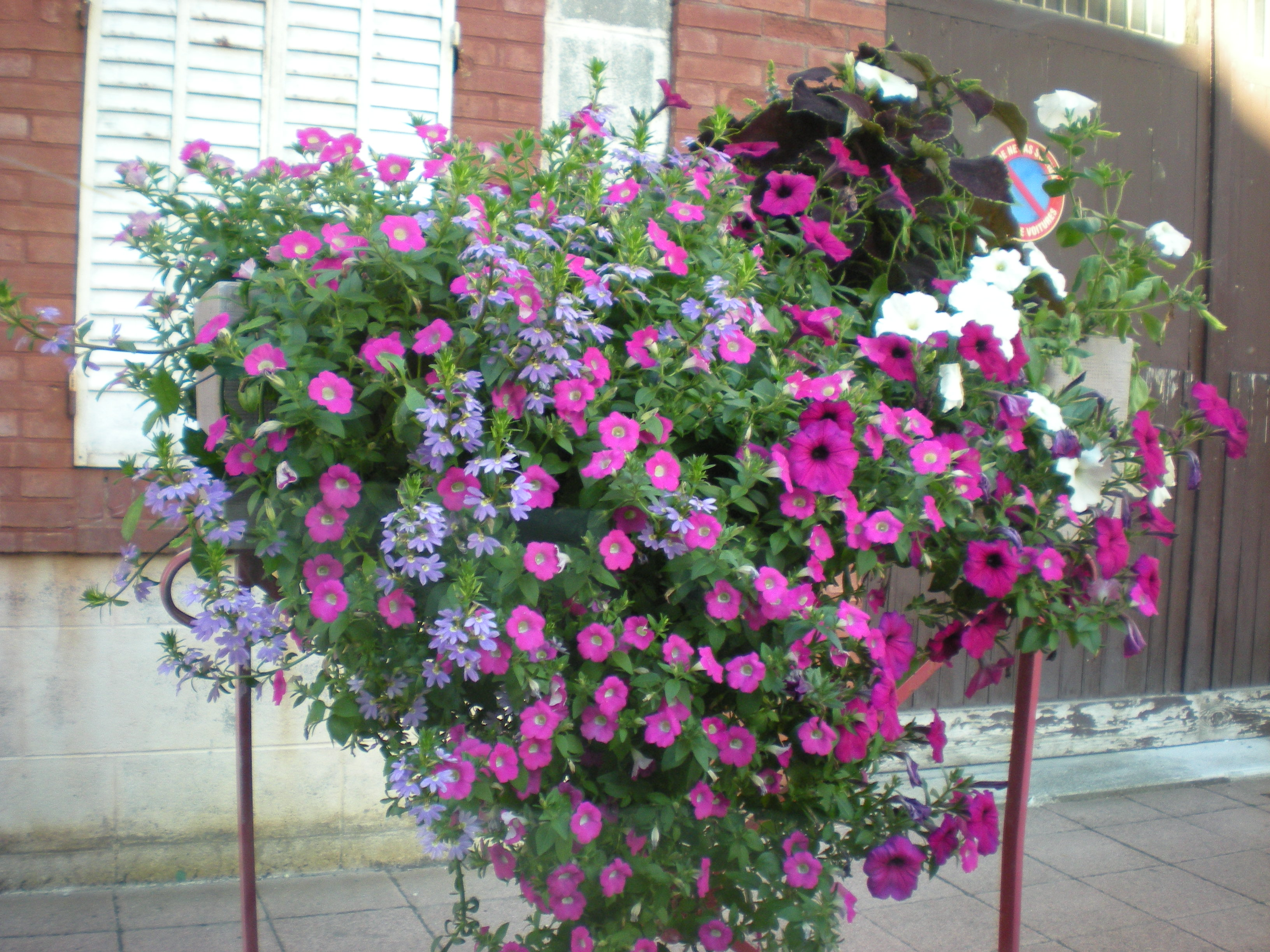
A planter in town, on Rue Pasteur

=== In the vicinity ===
- Natural heritage: Caves (Caves of Gargas, Gouffre d'Esparros, Grottes de Labastide) and natural environments (Les Baronnies, Vallée d'Aure, Louron Valley).
- Religious and historical heritage: Château de Mauvezin, Escaladieu Abbey, Saint-Bertrand-de-Comminges, and its Cathedral of Notre-Dame.
- Winter tourism: Cross-country and Alpine ski resorts (Saint-Lary-Pla d'Adet, Piau-Engaly, Peyragudes, Val-Louron, Nistos Cap Nestès).
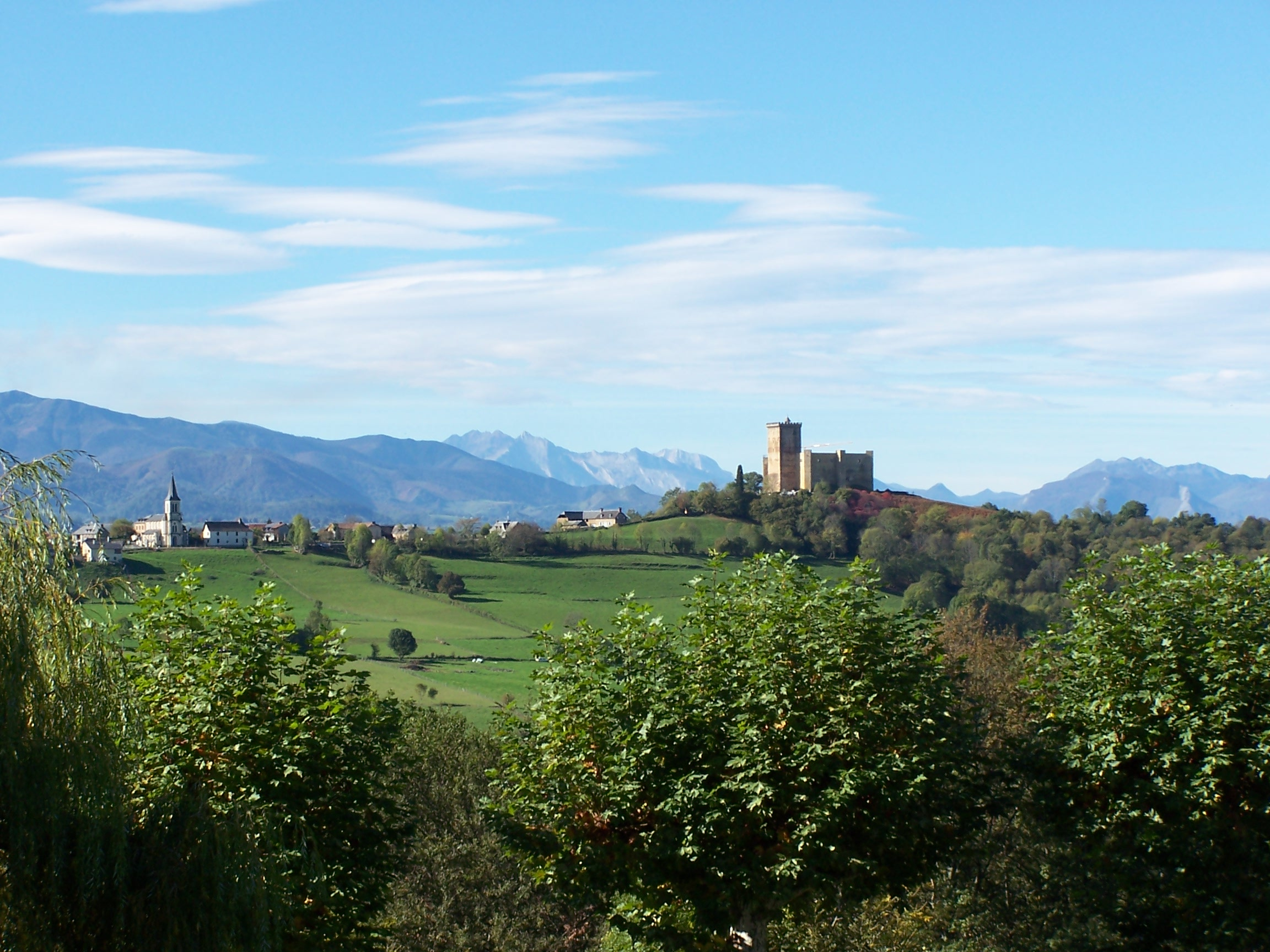
The Château de Mauvezin and the Pyrenees in the background

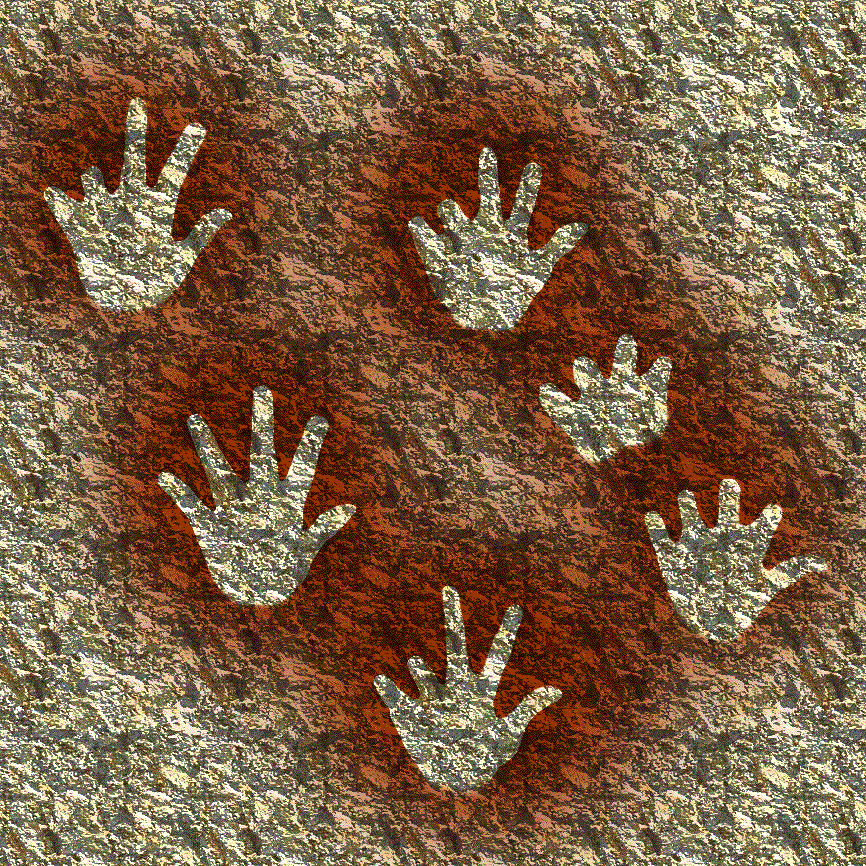
Grottes de Gargas

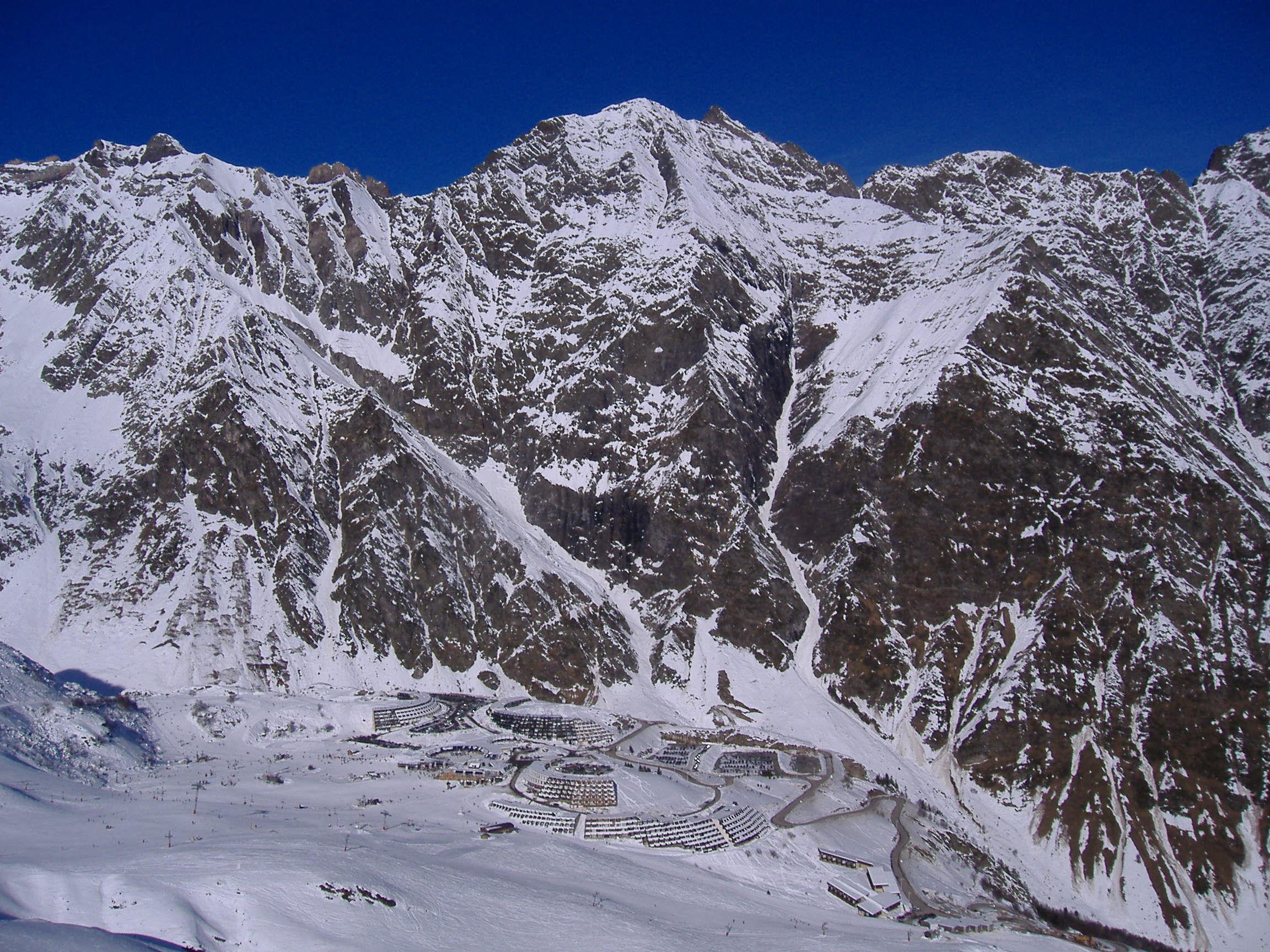
An aerial view of the ski resort of Piau-Engaly

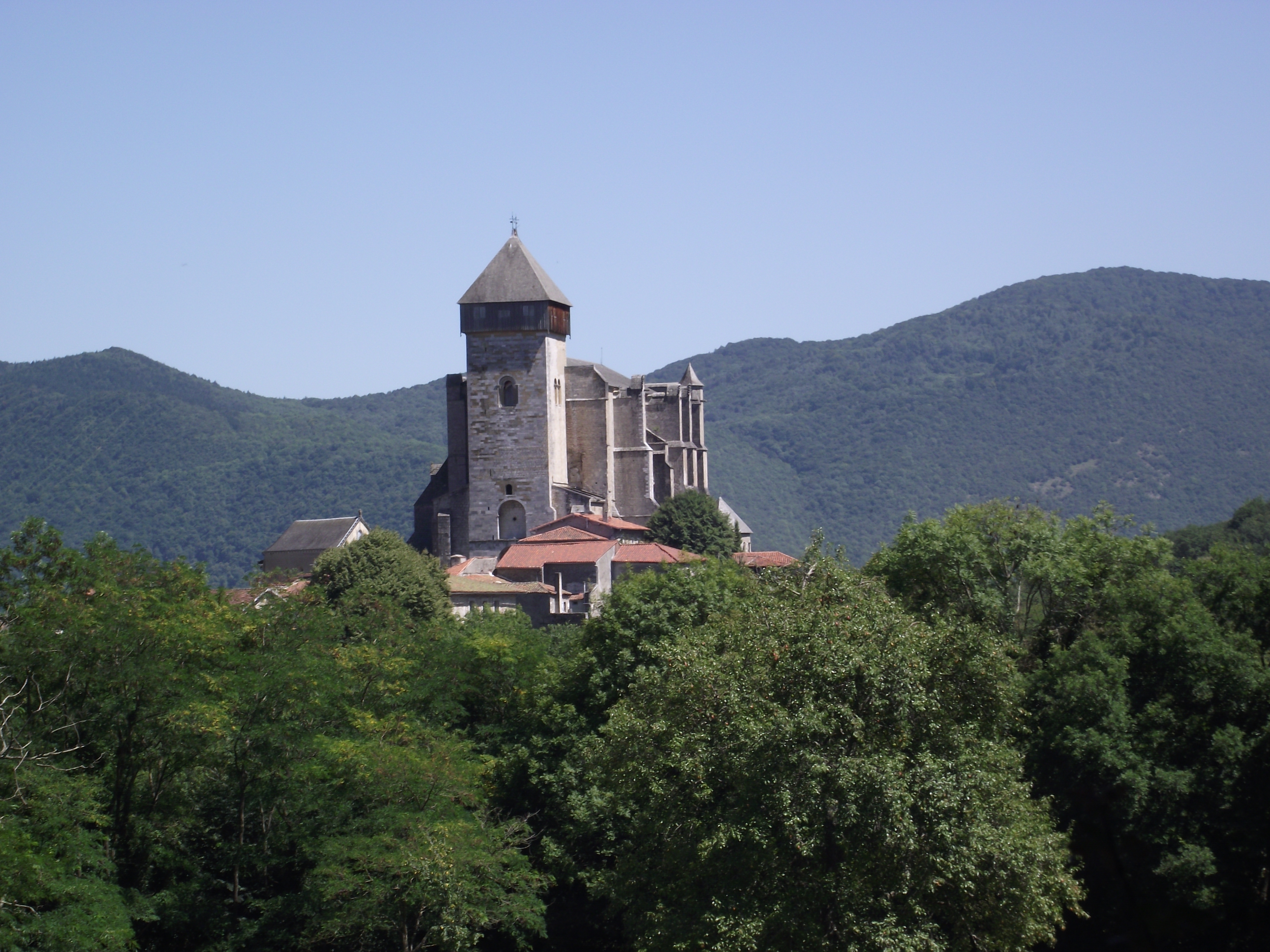
Saint-Bertrand-de-Comminges

=== Personalities linked to the commune ===
- Anglèse de Sagazan (died 1582) – a French shepherdess
- Félix Lacrampe (b. 1924) – Rugby union player, born in Lannemezan.
- Philippe Rougé-Thomas (b. 1961) – Rugby union player, born in Lannemezan.
- Pierre Berbizier (b. 1958) – Rugby union player formed in Lannemezan, former coach of the France team, of Italy, of the RC Narbonne and current coach of Racing Metro.
- René Hourquet (b. 1941) – Rugby union international.
- Paul-Henri de Le Rue (b. 1984) – snowboarder, the 2006 Turin Olympic bronze medalist, born in Lannemezan.
- Marie-Laure Brunet (b. 1988) – biathlete, Medal of bronze at the Vancouver Olympics in 2010, born in Lannemezan.
- Solène Jambaqué (b. 1988) – skier, quadruple medalist (2 gold medals, 1 silver and 1 bronze) at the Turin Paralympic Games in 2006 and double silver medallist at the Paralympic Games in Vancouver in 2010, attended the Lycée Michelet of Lannemezan in the skiing section.
- Edmond Lay (b. 1930) – architect, Grand Prix of Architecture born in Lannemezan
- Jean-Paul Abadie (b. 1958) – French chef and designated Cook of the year in 2004 by the Gault and Millau, he runs the restaurant l'Amphitryon in Lorient for which he was awarded two stars in the Michelin Guide in 2002.
- Antoine Dupont (b. 1996) – Rugby union player international at number 9.

=== Heraldry, logo and motto ===
Arms of Lannemezan	The arms of Lannemezan are blazoned : "Quartered: To the first and to the fourth of Or to three pales reamed gules the second azure a passing cow contiguous and cowbell of argent, in the third argent to a greyhound creeping and defined of sable."

== See also ==
- Communes of the Hautes-Pyrénées department

== Bibliography ==
- Hubert, Anne (1992). Les types de stations forestières du Lannemezan, Ger et moyen Adour [Types of forest areas in Lannemezan, Ger and middle Adour] (in French). éditions Cemagref.
- Péré, Francis (1993). L'église Saint-Jean-Baptiste de Lannemezan [Church of Saint-Jean-Baptiste de Lannemezan] (in French). éditions Maradi.
- Thuron, Marie-Claire (1999). Lannemezan 1930–1990 ville d'accueil [Lannemezan 1930–1990 town of welcome] (in French). éditions Lacour-Ollé.
- de Macedo, Pierre (2005). Le corps franc de libération lannemezanais [The French corps of the Lannemezan liberation] (in French). éditions Marrimpouey.
- Collectif (2008). De l'asile de la Demi-Lune aux Hôpitaux de Lannemezan (1938–2008) [The asylum of Demi-Lune in the hospitals of Lannemezan (1938–2008)] (in French). éditions Un Deux Quatre.
