= De Noé =

De Noé may refer to:

== People ==
- Louis-Pantaléon de Noé (1728-1816), Creole-French general

== Place ==
- Amédée de Noé (1818-1879), French caricaturist and lithographer
- Camp de Noé, a 14 hectare internment camp
- L'Isle-de-Noé, a commune in the Gers department in southwestern France
- Pont de l'Arche de Noé, a covered bridge

== Others ==
- Arca de Noé, an independent supporters group
- O Trapalhão na Arca de Noé, a 1983 Brazilian adventure parody film
- Vinicius para Crianças - Arca de Noé, 1980 Brazilian TV program
