= Idrac =

Idrac may refer to:

== People ==
- Anne-Marie Idrac (born 1951), French politician
- Antonin Idrac (1849-1884), French sculptor

== Place ==
- Idrac-Respaillès, a commune in the Gers department in southwestern France.
