= Hachan =

- Commune
- Coat of arms
- Location of Hachan
- Location within France Location within Occitanie
- Coordinates: 43°17′13″N 0°27′23″E
- Country: France
- Region: Occitania
- Department: Hautes-Pyrénées
- Arrondissement: Tarbes
- Canton: Les Coteaux
- Intercommunality: Pays de Trie et du Magnoac

Government
  - Mayor (2020–2026): Christian Ducaud
- Area^{1}: 1.86 km^{2} (0.72 sq mi)
- Elevation: 267 m (876 ft)
- Highest elevation: 350 m (1,150 ft)
- Lowest elevation: 274 m (899 ft)
- Population (2023): 46
  - Density: 25/km^{2} (64/sq mi)
- Time zone: UTC+01:00 (CET)
  - Summer (DST): UTC+02:00 (CEST)
- INSEE/Postal code: 65214 /65230
- ^{1} French Land Register data, which excludes lakes, ponds, glaciers > 1 km^{2} (0.386 sq mi or 247 acres) and river estuaries.

Hachan (French pronunciation: [aʃɑ̃]; Occitan: Haishan) is a commune in the Hautes-Pyrénées department in south-western France.

== Population ==
Historical population
Year	Pop.	±% p.a.
1968	53	—
1975	54	+0.27%
1982	40	−4.20%
1990	35	−1.66%
1999	38	+0.92%
2007	43	+1.56%
2012	38	−2.44%
2017	43	+2.50%
2023	46	+1.13%
Source: INSEE

== Geography ==
The Petite Baïse forms part of the commune's eastern border.

== See also ==
- Communes of the Hautes-Pyrénées department
