= Saint-Médard, Gers =

Saint-Médard
- Commune
- Location of Saint-Médard
- Location within France Location within Occitanie
- Coordinates: 43°29′28″N 0°27′37″E
- Country: France
- Region: Occitania
- Department: Gers
- Arrondissement: Mirande
- Canton: Mirande-Astarac

Government
  - Mayor (2020–2026): Annie Bourdallé
- Area^{1}: 17.07 km^{2} (6.59 sq mi)
- Elevation: 182 m (597 ft)
- Highest elevation: 281 m (922 ft)
- Lowest elevation: 165 m (541 ft)
- Population (2023): 343
  - Density: 20.1/km^{2} (52.0/sq mi)
- Time zone: UTC+01:00 (CET)
  - Summer (DST): UTC+02:00 (CEST)
- INSEE/Postal code: 32394 /32300
- ^{1} French Land Register data, which excludes lakes, ponds, glaciers > 1 km^{2} (0.386 sq mi or 247 acres) and river estuaries.

Saint-Médard (French pronunciation: [sɛ̃ medaʁ]; Gascon: Sent Mesard) is a commune in the Gers department in southwestern France.

== Geography ==
The Petite Baïse forms part of the commune's southern border, flows north through the middle of the commune, then forms part of its northern border.

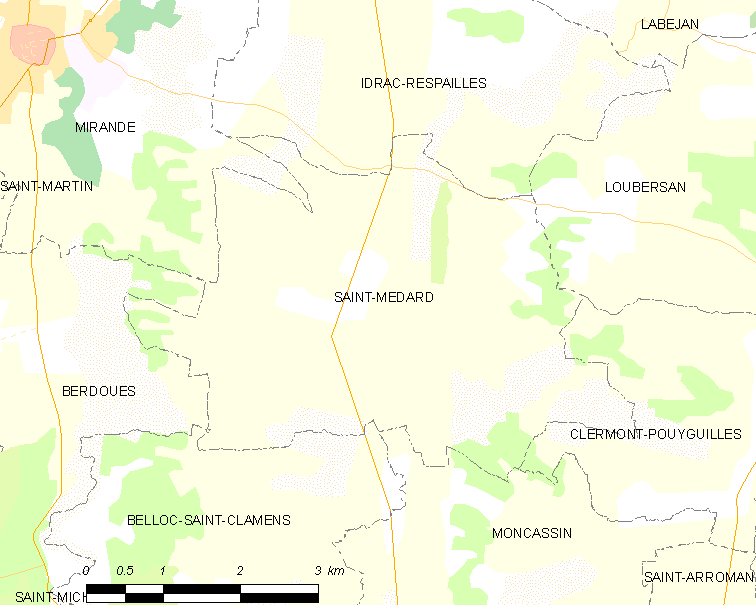
Saint-Médard and its surrounding communes

== Population ==
Historical population
Year	Pop.	±% p.a.
1968	282	—
1975	281	−0.05%
1982	274	−0.36%
1990	277	+0.14%
1999	293	+0.63%
2007	344	+2.03%
2012	321	−1.37%
2017	327	+0.37%
2023	343	+0.80%
Source: INSEE

== See also ==
- Communes of the Gers department
