= Vieuzos =

- Commune
- Coat of arms
- Location of Vieuzos
- Location within France Location within Occitanie
- Coordinates: 43°15′34″N 0°27′03″E
- Country: France
- Region: Occitania
- Department: Hautes-Pyrénées
- Arrondissement: Tarbes
- Canton: Les Coteaux
- Intercommunality: Pays de Trie et du Magnoac

Government
  - Mayor (2020–2026): Thierry Fourcaud
- Area^{1}: 4.93 km^{2} (1.90 sq mi)
- Elevation: 375 m (1,230 ft)
- Highest elevation: 465 m (1,526 ft)
- Lowest elevation: 293 m (961 ft)
- Population (2023): 51
  - Density: 10/km^{2} (27/sq mi)
- Time zone: UTC+01:00 (CET)
  - Summer (DST): UTC+02:00 (CEST)
- INSEE/Postal code: 65468 /65230
- ^{1} French Land Register data, which excludes lakes, ponds, glaciers > 1 km^{2} (0.386 sq mi or 247 acres) and river estuaries.

Vieuzos is a commune in the Hautes-Pyrénées department in south-western France.

== Geography ==
The Petite Baïse forms most of the commune's western border.

== See also ==
- Communes of the Hautes-Pyrénées department
