= Saint-Élix-Theux =

- Commune
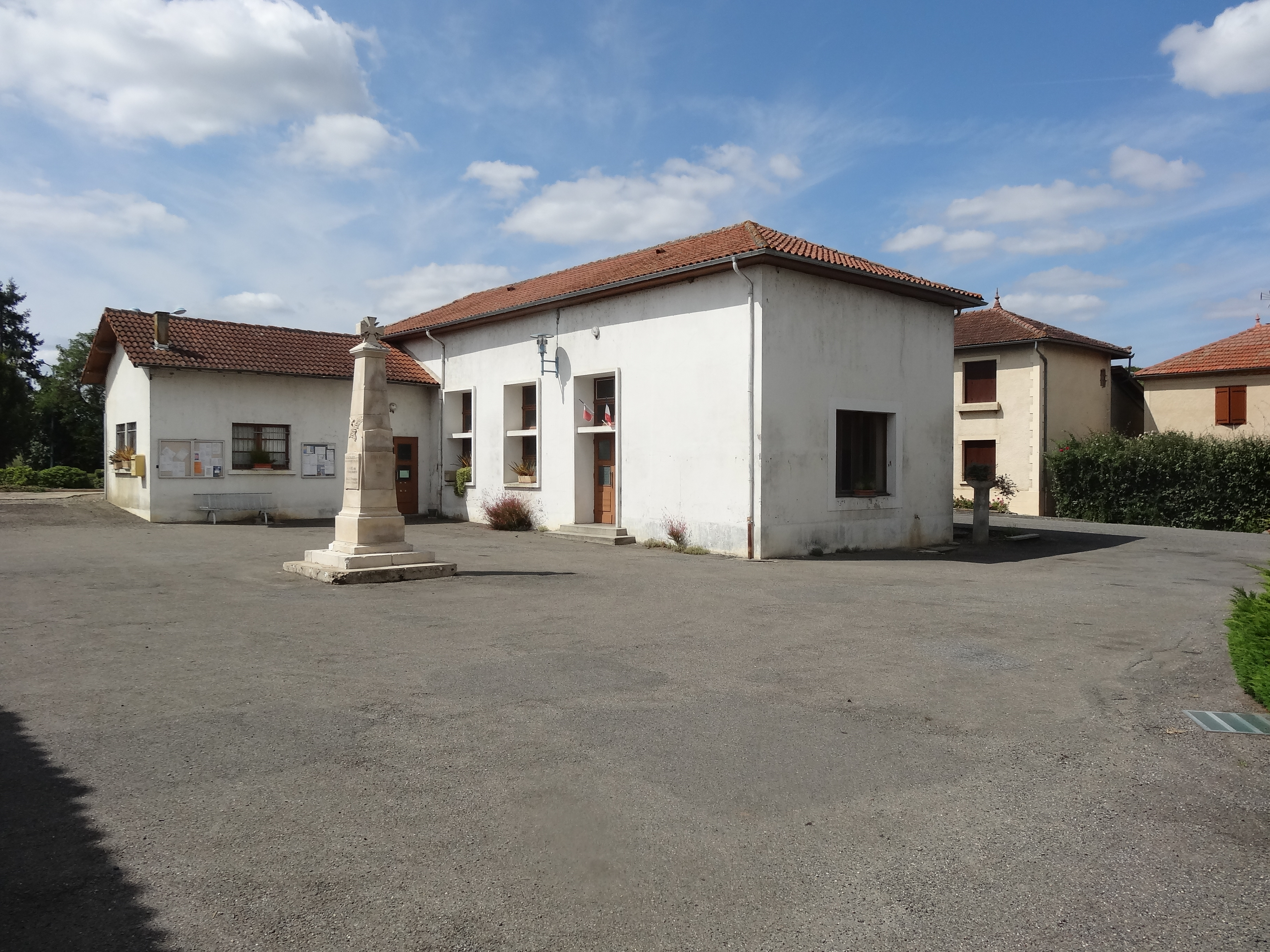
- The town hall in Saint-Élix-Theux
- Location of Saint-Élix-Theux
- Location within France Location within Occitanie
- Coordinates: 43°25′47″N 0°28′14″E
- Country: France
- Region: Occitania
- Department: Gers
- Arrondissement: Mirande
- Canton: Mirande-Astarac

Government
  - Mayor (2020–2026): Jean-Michel Laffitte
- Area^{1}: 8.37 km^{2} (3.23 sq mi)
- Elevation: 209 m (686 ft)
- Highest elevation: 302 m (991 ft)
- Lowest elevation: 193 m (633 ft)
- Population (2023): 85
  - Density: 10/km^{2} (26/sq mi)
- Time zone: UTC+01:00 (CET)
  - Summer (DST): UTC+02:00 (CEST)
- INSEE/Postal code: 32375 /32300
- ^{1} French Land Register data, which excludes lakes, ponds, glaciers > 1 km^{2} (0.386 sq mi or 247 acres) and river estuaries.

Saint-Élix-Theux is a commune in the Gers department in southwestern France.

== Geography ==
The Petite Baïse flows north through the eastern part of the commune.

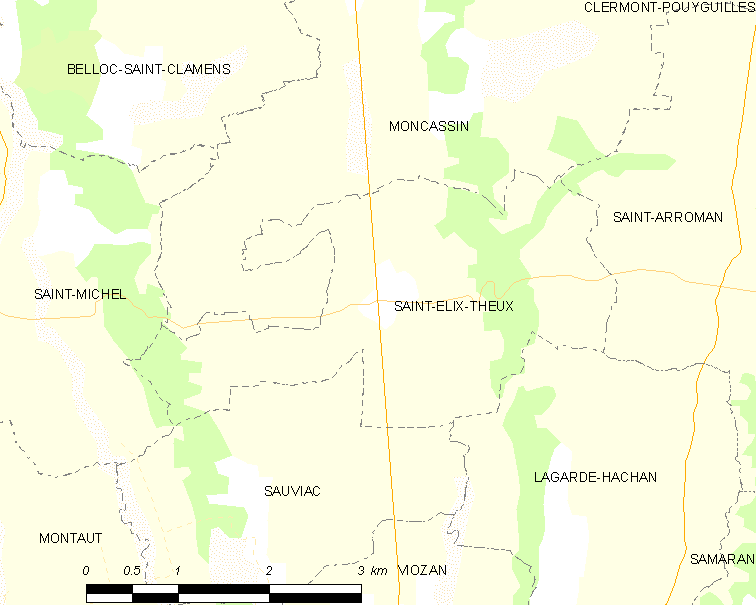
Saint-Élix-Theux and its surrounding communes

== Population ==
Historical population
Year	Pop.	±% p.a.
1968	167	—
1975	152	−1.34%
1982	145	−0.67%
1990	131	−1.26%
1999	110	−1.92%
2007	108	−0.23%
2012	123	+2.64%
2017	106	−2.93%
2023	85	−3.61%
Source: INSEE

== See also ==
- Communes of the Gers department
