= Tournous-Devant =

- Commune
- Coat of arms
- Location of Tournous-Devant
- Location within France Location within Occitanie
- Coordinates: 43°14′56″N 0°25′08″E
- Country: France
- Region: Occitania
- Department: Hautes-Pyrénées
- Arrondissement: Bagnères-de-Bigorre
- Canton: La Vallée de l'Arros et des Baïses
- Intercommunality: Plateau de Lannemezan
- Area^{1}: 4.67 km^{2} (1.80 sq mi)
- Elevation: 330 m (1,080 ft)
- Highest elevation: 342 m (1,122 ft)
- Lowest elevation: 280 m (920 ft)
- Population (2023): 87
  - Density: 19/km^{2} (48/sq mi)
- Time zone: UTC+01:00 (CET)
  - Summer (DST): UTC+02:00 (CEST)
- INSEE/Postal code: 65449 /65330
- ^{1} French Land Register data, which excludes lakes, ponds, glaciers > 1 km^{2} (0.386 sq mi or 247 acres) and river estuaries.

Tournous-Devant is a commune in the Hautes-Pyrénées department in south-western France.

== Geography ==
The Petite Baïse river forms most of the commune's eastern border.

== See also ==
- Communes of the Hautes-Pyrénées department
