= Lamazère =

- Commune
- Location of Lamazère
- Location within France Location within Occitanie
- Coordinates: 43°33′29″N 0°27′12″E
- Country: France
- Region: Occitania
- Department: Gers
- Arrondissement: Mirande
- Canton: Mirande-Astarac
- Intercommunality: Cœur d'Astarac en Gascogne

Government
  - Mayor (2020–2026): Jean-Marc Desbarats
- Area^{1}: 7.47 km^{2} (2.88 sq mi)
- Elevation: 200 m (660 ft)
- Highest elevation: 243 m (797 ft)
- Lowest elevation: 141 m (463 ft)
- Population (2023): 129
  - Density: 17.3/km^{2} (44.7/sq mi)
- Time zone: UTC+01:00 (CET)
  - Summer (DST): UTC+02:00 (CEST)
- INSEE/Postal code: 32187 /32300
- ^{1} French Land Register data, which excludes lakes, ponds, glaciers > 1 km^{2} (0.386 sq mi or 247 acres) and river estuaries.

Lamazère (French pronunciation: [lamazɛʁ]; Occitan: La Masera) is a commune in the Gers department in southwestern France.

== Geography ==
The Petite Baïse forms part of the commune's southern border, flows northwest through the middle of the commune, then forms part of its northwestern border.

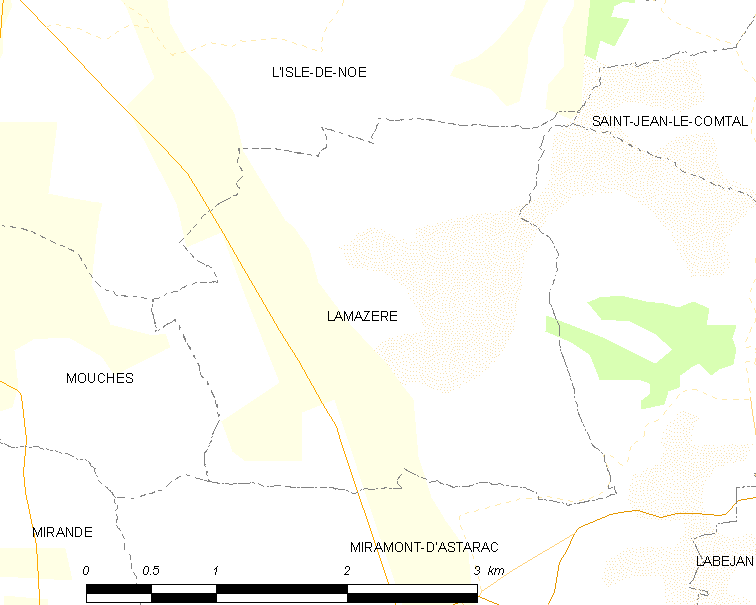
Lamazère and its surrounding communes

== Population ==
Historical population
Year	Pop.	±% p.a.
1968	135	—
1975	108	−3.14%
1982	109	+0.13%
1990	113	+0.45%
1999	130	+1.57%
2007	152	+1.97%
2012	135	−2.34%
2017	121	−2.17%
2023	129	+1.07%
Source: INSEE

== See also ==
- Communes of the Gers department
