= Ponsan-Soubiran =

- Commune
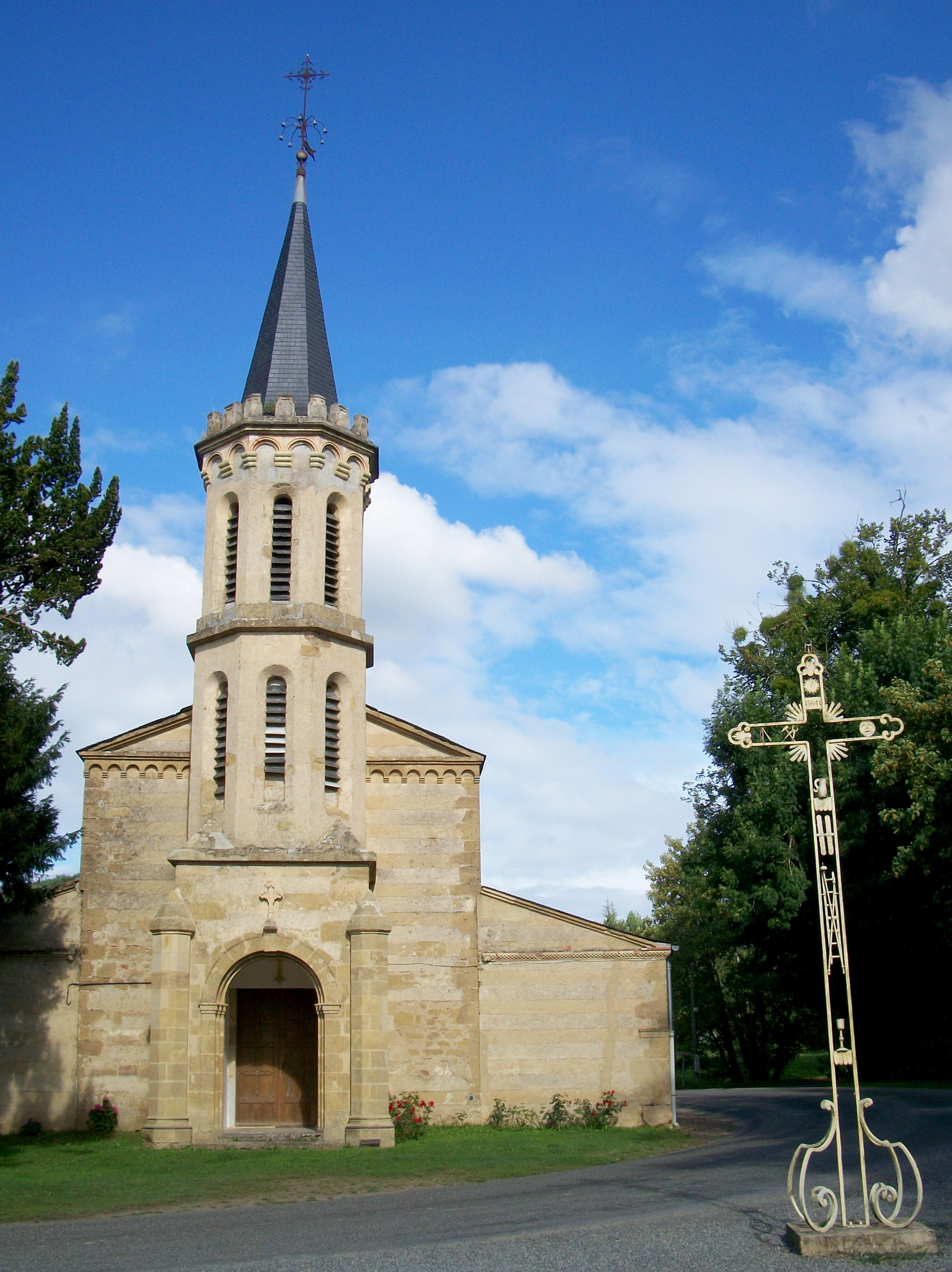
- The church in Ponsan-Soubiran
- Location of Ponsan-Soubiran
- Location within France Location within Occitanie
- Coordinates: 43°21′08″N 0°29′06″E
- Country: France
- Region: Occitania
- Department: Gers
- Arrondissement: Mirande
- Canton: Astarac-Gimone
- Intercommunality: Val de Gers

Government
  - Mayor (2020–2026): Chantal Cazes
- Area^{1}: 6.87 km^{2} (2.65 sq mi)
- Elevation: 239 m (784 ft)
- Highest elevation: 370 m (1,210 ft)
- Lowest elevation: 227 m (745 ft)
- Population (2023): 80
  - Density: 12/km^{2} (30/sq mi)
- Time zone: UTC+01:00 (CET)
  - Summer (DST): UTC+02:00 (CEST)
- INSEE/Postal code: 32324 /32300
- ^{1} French Land Register data, which excludes lakes, ponds, glaciers > 1 km^{2} (0.386 sq mi or 247 acres) and river estuaries.

Ponsan-Soubiran (French pronunciation: [pɔ̃sɑ̃ subiʁɑ̃]; Occitan: Ponsan Sobiran) is a commune in the Gers department in southwestern France.

== Geography ==
=== Localisation ===
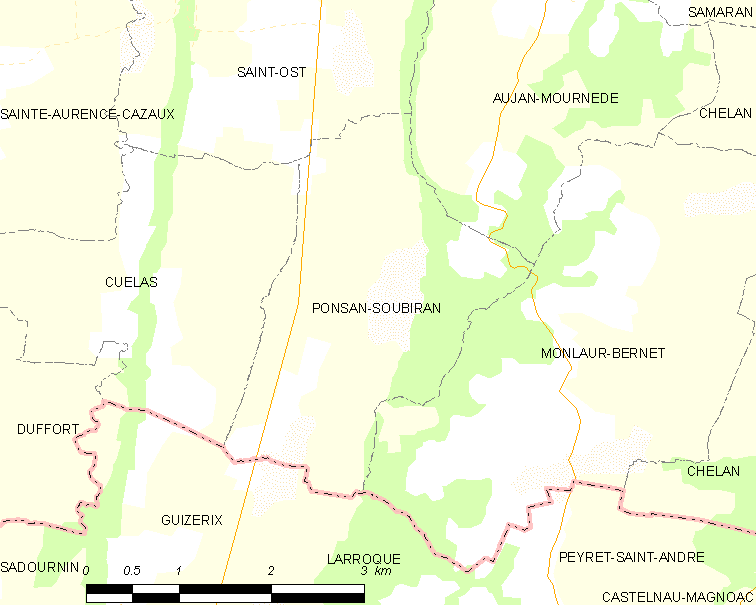
Ponsan-Soubiran and its surrounding communes

=== Hydrography ===
The Petite Baïse flows north through the middle of the commune; then forms part of the commune's northern border.

== Population ==
Historical population
Year	Pop.	±% p.a.
1968	138	—
1975	117	−2.33%
1982	108	−1.14%
1990	122	+1.54%
1999	118	−0.37%
2007	127	+0.92%
2012	117	−1.63%
2017	90	−5.11%
2023	80	−1.94%
Source: INSEE

== See also ==
- Communes of the Gers department
