= Aujan-Mournède =

- Commune
- Location of Aujan-Mournède
- Location within France Location within Occitanie
- Coordinates: 43°22′57″N 0°30′12″E
- Country: France
- Region: Occitania
- Department: Gers
- Arrondissement: Mirande
- Canton: Astarac-Gimone
- Intercommunality: CC Val Gers

Government
  - Mayor (2020–2026): Florence Bordeneuve
- Area^{1}: 8.46 km^{2} (3.27 sq mi)
- Elevation: 250 m (820 ft)
- Highest elevation: 370 m (1,210 ft)
- Lowest elevation: 217 m (712 ft)
- Population (2023): 89
  - Density: 11/km^{2} (27/sq mi)
- Time zone: UTC+01:00 (CET)
  - Summer (DST): UTC+02:00 (CEST)
- INSEE/Postal code: 32015 /32300
- ^{1} French Land Register data, which excludes lakes, ponds, glaciers > 1 km^{2} (0.386 sq mi or 247 acres) and river estuaries.

Aujan-Mournède (French pronunciation: [oʒɑ̃ muʁnɛd]; Occitan: Aujan e Morneda) is a commune in the Gers department in southwestern France.

== Geography ==
=== Localization ===
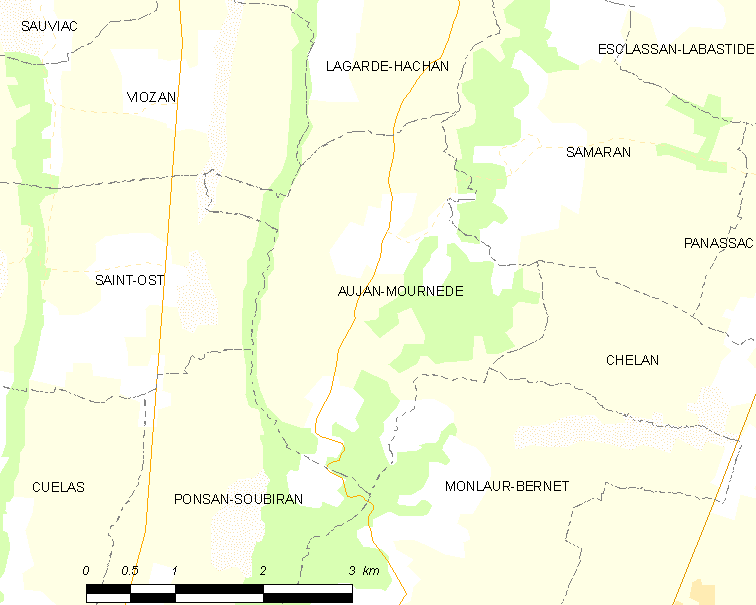
Aujan-Mournède and its surrounding communes

=== Hydrography ===
The Petite Baïse forms part of the commune's western border.

== Population ==
Historical population
Year	Pop.	±% p.a.
1968	144	—
1975	127	−1.78%
1982	117	−1.16%
1990	113	−0.43%
1999	107	−0.60%
2007	96	−1.35%
2012	94	−0.42%
2017	89	−1.09%
2023	89	+0.00%
Source: INSEE

== See also ==
- Communes of the Gers department
