= Sabarros =

- Commune
- Coat of arms
- Location of Sabarros
- Location within France Location within Occitanie
- Coordinates: 43°14′18″N 0°26′12″E
- Country: France
- Region: Occitania
- Department: Hautes-Pyrénées
- Arrondissement: Bagnères-de-Bigorre
- Canton: La Vallée de l'Arros et des Baïses
- Intercommunality: Plateau de Lannemezan

Government
  - Mayor (2020–2026): Aimé Courtade
- Area^{1}: 3.67 km^{2} (1.42 sq mi)
- Elevation: 448 m (1,470 ft)
- Highest elevation: 483 m (1,585 ft)
- Lowest elevation: 312 m (1,024 ft)
- Population (2023): 33
  - Density: 9.0/km^{2} (23/sq mi)
- Time zone: UTC+01:00 (CET)
  - Summer (DST): UTC+02:00 (CEST)
- INSEE/Postal code: 65381 /65330
- ^{1} French Land Register data, which excludes lakes, ponds, glaciers > 1 km^{2} (0.386 sq mi or 247 acres) and river estuaries.

Sabarros (French pronunciation: [sabaʁɔs]; Occitan: Sabarròs) is a commune in the Hautes-Pyrénées department in south-western France.

== Population ==
Historical population
Year	Pop.	±% p.a.
1968	59	—
1975	58	−0.24%
1982	59	+0.24%
1990	49	−2.29%
1999	39	−2.50%
2007	34	−1.70%
2012	32	−1.21%
2017	34	+1.22%
2023	33	−0.50%
Source: INSEE

== Geography ==
The Petite Baïse forms part of the commune's western border.

== See also ==
- Communes of the Hautes-Pyrénées department
