= Moncassin =

- Commune
- Location of Moncassin
- Location within France Location within Occitanie
- Coordinates: 43°27′16″N 0°28′49″E
- Country: France
- Region: Occitania
- Department: Gers
- Arrondissement: Mirande
- Canton: Mirande-Astarac

Government
  - Mayor (2020–2026): Jean-Claude Verdier
- Area^{1}: 13.93 km^{2} (5.38 sq mi)
- Elevation: 169 m (554 ft)
- Highest elevation: 283 m (928 ft)
- Lowest elevation: 179 m (587 ft)
- Population (2023): 123
  - Density: 8.83/km^{2} (22.9/sq mi)
- Time zone: UTC+01:00 (CET)
  - Summer (DST): UTC+02:00 (CEST)
- INSEE/Postal code: 32263 /32300
- ^{1} French Land Register data, which excludes lakes, ponds, glaciers > 1 km^{2} (0.386 sq mi or 247 acres) and river estuaries.

Moncassin (French pronunciation: [mɔ̃kasɛ̃]; Occitan: Montcassin) is a commune in the Gers department in southwestern France.

== Geography ==
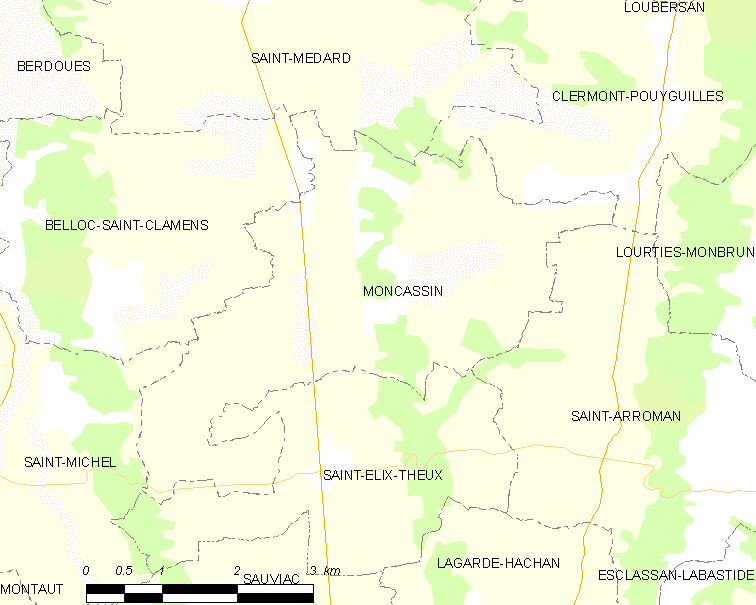
Moncassin and its surrounding communes

The Petite Baïse flows north through the middle of the commune and forms parts of its northern border.

== Population ==
Historical population
Year	Pop.	±% p.a.
1968	177	—
1975	151	−2.24%
1982	138	−1.28%
1990	122	−1.53%
1999	119	−0.28%
2007	126	+0.72%
2012	137	+1.69%
2017	134	−0.44%
2023	123	−1.42%
Source: INSEE

== See also ==
- Communes of the Gers department
