= Saint-Ost =

- Commune
- Location of Saint-Ost
- Location within France Location within Occitanie
- Coordinates: 43°22′44″N 0°28′11″E
- Country: France
- Region: Occitania
- Department: Gers
- Arrondissement: Mirande
- Canton: Mirande-Astarac

Government
  - Mayor (2020–2026): Christian Verdier
- Area^{1}: 6.84 km^{2} (2.64 sq mi)
- Elevation: 217 m (712 ft)
- Highest elevation: 287 m (942 ft)
- Lowest elevation: 197 m (646 ft)
- Population (2023): 95
  - Density: 14/km^{2} (36/sq mi)
- Time zone: UTC+01:00 (CET)
  - Summer (DST): UTC+02:00 (CEST)
- INSEE/Postal code: 32401 /32300
- ^{1} French Land Register data, which excludes lakes, ponds, glaciers > 1 km^{2} (0.386 sq mi or 247 acres) and river estuaries.

Saint-Ost is a commune in the Gers department in southwestern France.

== Geography ==
The Petite Baïse forms part of the commune's southeastern border, flows north through the middle of the commune, then forms part of the commune's northeastern border.

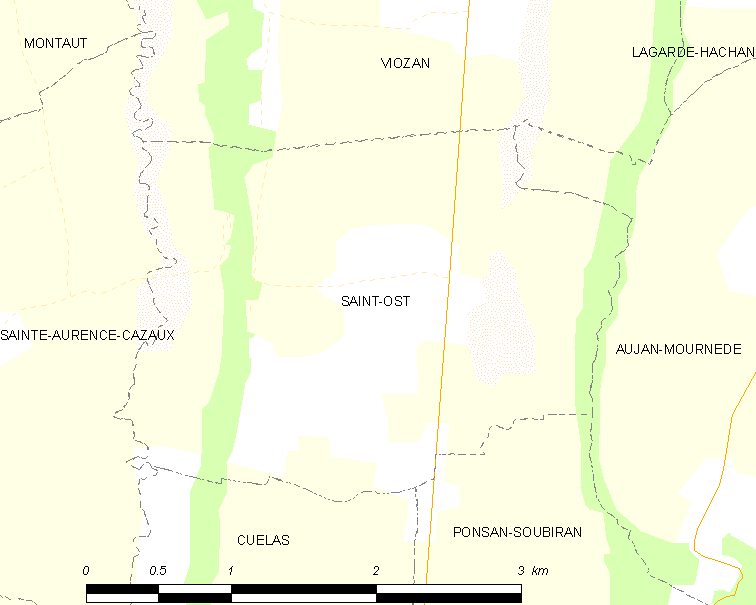
Saint-Ost and its surrounding communes

== Population ==
Historical population
Year	Pop.	±% p.a.
1968	137	—
1975	108	−3.34%
1982	105	−0.40%
1990	94	−1.37%
1999	86	−0.98%
2007	82	−0.59%
2012	84	+0.48%
2017	87	+0.70%
2023	95	+1.48%
Source: INSEE

== See also ==
- Communes of the Gers department
