= Campistrous =

- Commune
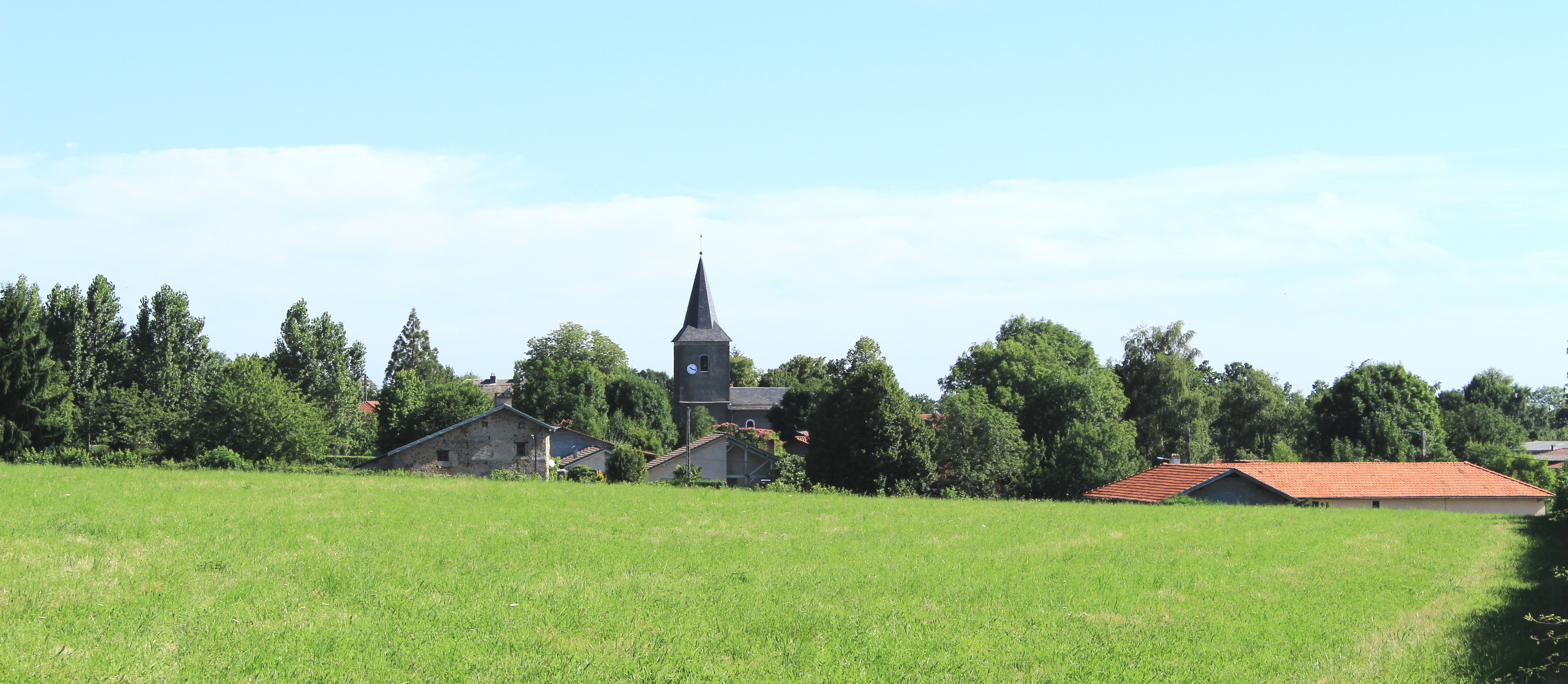
- View of Campistrous

- Coat of arms
- Location of Campistrous
- Location within France Location within Occitanie
- Coordinates: 43°09′11″N 0°22′41″E
- Country: France
- Region: Occitania
- Department: Hautes-Pyrénées
- Arrondissement: Bagnères-de-Bigorre
- Canton: La Vallée de la Barousse
- Intercommunality: CC du Plateau de Lannemezan

Government
  - Mayor (2020–2026): Xavier Sarniguet
- Area^{1}: 10.12 km^{2} (3.91 sq mi)
- Elevation: 540 m (1,770 ft)
- Highest elevation: 615 m (2,018 ft)
- Lowest elevation: 435 m (1,427 ft)
- Population (2023): 314
  - Density: 31.0/km^{2} (80.4/sq mi)
- Time zone: UTC+01:00 (CET)
  - Summer (DST): UTC+02:00 (CEST)
- INSEE/Postal code: 65125 /65300
- ^{1} French Land Register data, which excludes lakes, ponds, glaciers > 1 km^{2} (0.386 sq mi or 247 acres) and river estuaries.

Campistrous is a commune in the Hautes-Pyrénées department in south-western France.

== Geography ==
The Petite Baïse forms part of the commune's north-eastern border.

=== Climate ===
Campistrous has an oceanic climate (Köppen climate classification Cfb). The average annual temperature in Campistrous is 11.9 °C (53.4 °F). The average annual rainfall is 1,140.4 mm (44.90 in) with May as the wettest month. The temperatures are highest on average in August, at around 19.3 °C (66.7 °F), and lowest in January, at around 5.3 °C (41.5 °F). The highest temperature ever recorded in Campistrous was 38.2 °C (100.8 °F) on 24 August 2023; the coldest temperature ever recorded was −12.9 °C (8.8 °F) on 8 February 2012.

Climate data for Campistrous (1991−2020 normals, extremes 1989−present)
Month	Jan	Feb	Mar	Apr	May	Jun	Jul	Aug	Sep	Oct	Nov	Dec	Year
Record high °C (°F)	23.5 (74.3)	24.1 (75.4)	27.0 (80.6)	29.4 (84.9)	31.1 (88.0)	35.8 (96.4)	37.5 (99.5)	38.2 (100.8)	34.9 (94.8)	31.5 (88.7)	25.3 (77.5)	23.6 (74.5)	38.2 (100.8)
Mean daily maximum °C (°F)	9.5 (49.1)	10.1 (50.2)	13.1 (55.6)	15.0 (59.0)	18.4 (65.1)	21.7 (71.1)	23.7 (74.7)	24.2 (75.6)	21.3 (70.3)	17.9 (64.2)	12.7 (54.9)	10.5 (50.9)	16.5 (61.7)
Daily mean °C (°F)	5.3 (41.5)	5.7 (42.3)	8.3 (46.9)	10.2 (50.4)	13.7 (56.7)	16.9 (62.4)	18.9 (66.0)	19.3 (66.7)	16.4 (61.5)	13.3 (55.9)	8.4 (47.1)	6.2 (43.2)	11.9 (53.4)
Mean daily minimum °C (°F)	1.1 (34.0)	1.2 (34.2)	3.5 (38.3)	5.4 (41.7)	9.0 (48.2)	12.1 (53.8)	14.0 (57.2)	14.4 (57.9)	11.5 (52.7)	8.8 (47.8)	4.2 (39.6)	1.9 (35.4)	7.3 (45.1)
Record low °C (°F)	−11.9 (10.6)	−12.9 (8.8)	−10.6 (12.9)	−4.4 (24.1)	−1.1 (30.0)	1.7 (35.1)	5.6 (42.1)	5.5 (41.9)	1.9 (35.4)	−3.8 (25.2)	−8.2 (17.2)	−11.2 (11.8)	−12.9 (8.8)
Average precipitation mm (inches)	101.8 (4.01)	83.7 (3.30)	90.5 (3.56)	117.0 (4.61)	125.5 (4.94)	90.2 (3.55)	82.8 (3.26)	70.1 (2.76)	74.3 (2.93)	83.7 (3.30)	123.4 (4.86)	97.4 (3.83)	1,140.4 (44.90)
Average precipitation days (≥ 1.0 mm)	11.3	10.4	10.9	12.8	12.4	10.8	9.3	9.0	9.3	10.4	12.2	10.6	129.4
Mean monthly sunshine hours	108.2	133.9	163.9	168.0	183.6	202.4	210.0	203.5	192.4	160.1	117.9	116.7	1,960.3
Source: Meteociel

== See also ==
- Communes of the Hautes-Pyrénées department
