= Clarens, Hautes-Pyrénées =

Clarens
- Commune
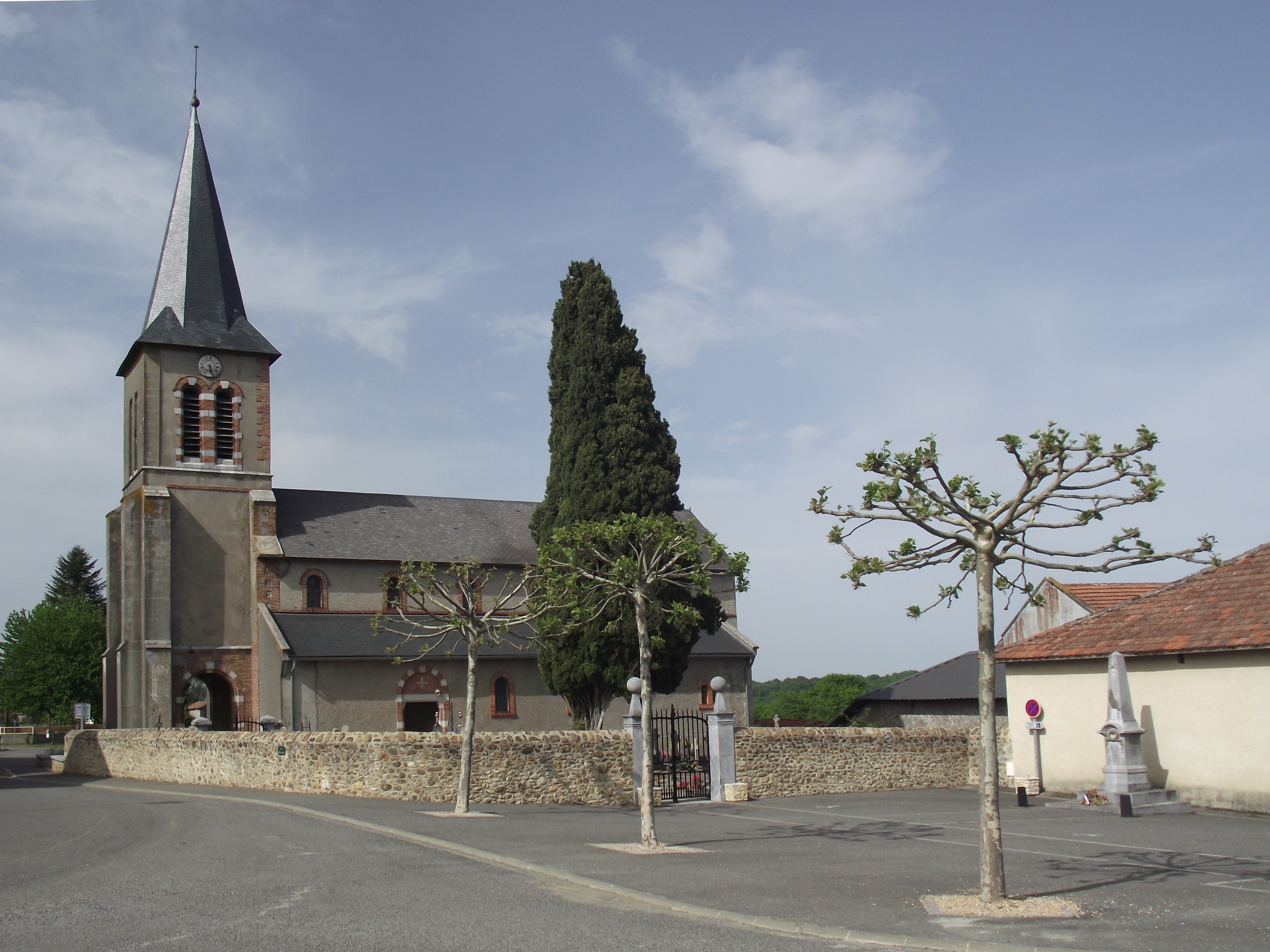
- The church of Clarens

- Coat of arms
- Location of Clarens
- Location within France Location within Occitanie
- Coordinates: 43°09′50″N 0°24′54″E
- Country: France
- Region: Occitania
- Department: Hautes-Pyrénées
- Arrondissement: Bagnères-de-Bigorre
- Canton: La Vallée de la Barousse
- Intercommunality: CC Plateau de Lannemezan

Government
  - Mayor (2020–2026): Alain Piaser
- Area^{1}: 11.3 km^{2} (4.4 sq mi)
- Elevation: 550 m (1,800 ft)
- Highest elevation: 602 m (1,975 ft)
- Lowest elevation: 406 m (1,332 ft)
- Population (2023): 513
  - Density: 45.4/km^{2} (118/sq mi)
- Time zone: UTC+01:00 (CET)
  - Summer (DST): UTC+02:00 (CEST)
- INSEE/Postal code: 65150 /65300
- ^{1} French Land Register data, which excludes lakes, ponds, glaciers > 1 km^{2} (0.386 sq mi or 247 acres) and river estuaries.

Clarens is a commune in the Hautes-Pyrénées department and Occitanie region, in south-western France.

== Geography ==
The Petite Baïse forms most of the commune's western border.

== Places to Visit ==
1. Saint-Bertrand-de-Comminges
2. Valcabrere
3. Mont d'Astarac
4. Col d'Aspin
5. Tarbes
6. Arreau

== See also ==
- Communes of the Hautes-Pyrénées department
