= Viozan =

- Commune
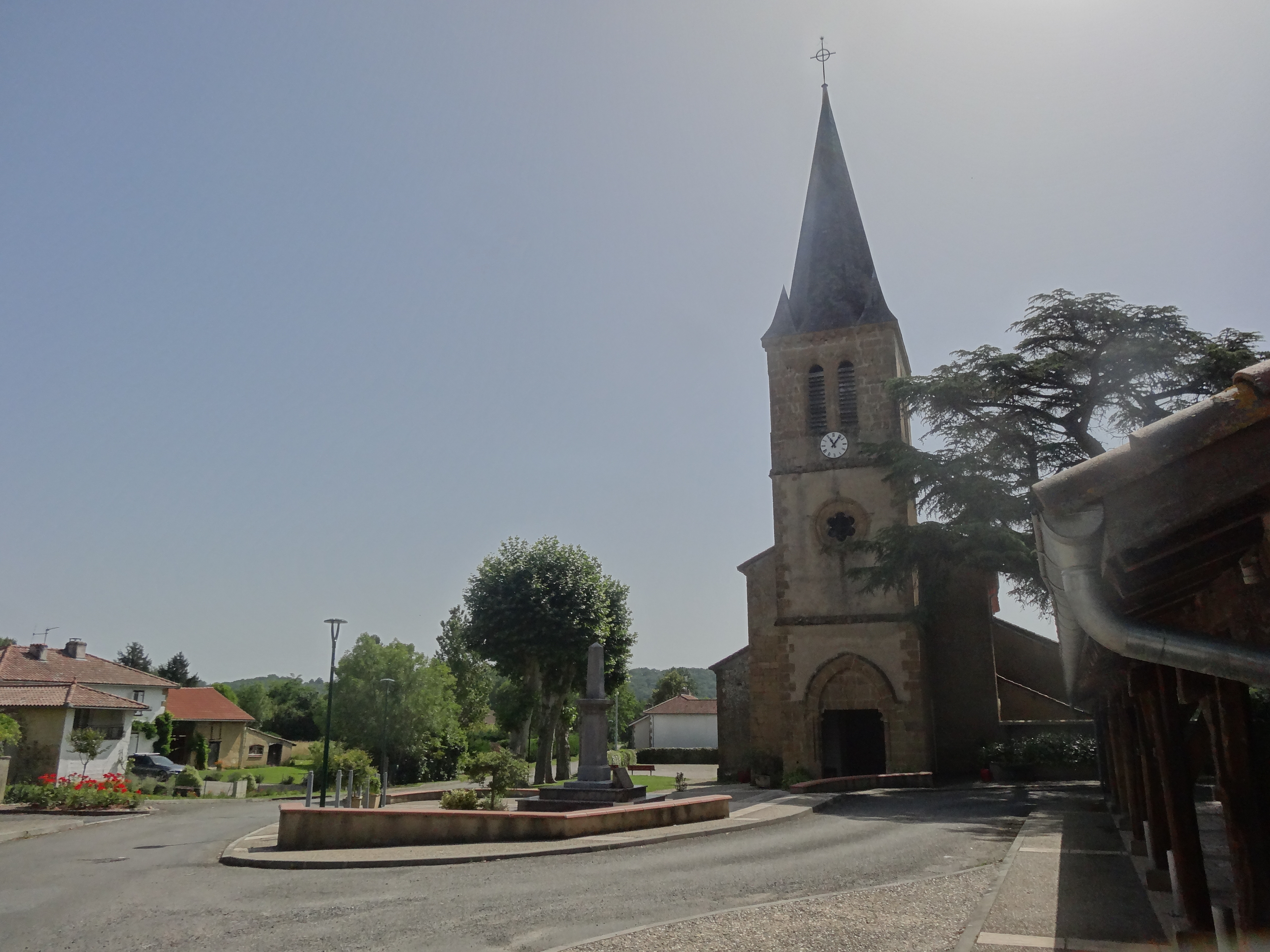
- Saint-Pierre church in Viozan
- Location of Viozan
- Location within France Location within Occitanie
- Coordinates: 43°23′39″N 0°28′31″E
- Country: France
- Region: Occitania
- Department: Gers
- Arrondissement: Mirande
- Canton: Mirande-Astarac

Government
  - Mayor (2020–2026): Jean-François Abadie
- Area^{1}: 6.76 km^{2} (2.61 sq mi)
- Elevation: 229 m (751 ft)
- Highest elevation: 285 m (935 ft)
- Lowest elevation: 192 m (630 ft)
- Population (2023): 92
  - Density: 14/km^{2} (35/sq mi)
- Time zone: UTC+01:00 (CET)
  - Summer (DST): UTC+02:00 (CEST)
- INSEE/Postal code: 32466 /32300
- ^{1} French Land Register data, which excludes lakes, ponds, glaciers > 1 km^{2} (0.386 sq mi or 247 acres) and river estuaries.

Viozan (French pronunciation: [vjozɑ̃]; Gascon: Viosan) is a commune in the Gers department in southwestern France.

== Geography ==
=== Localisation ===
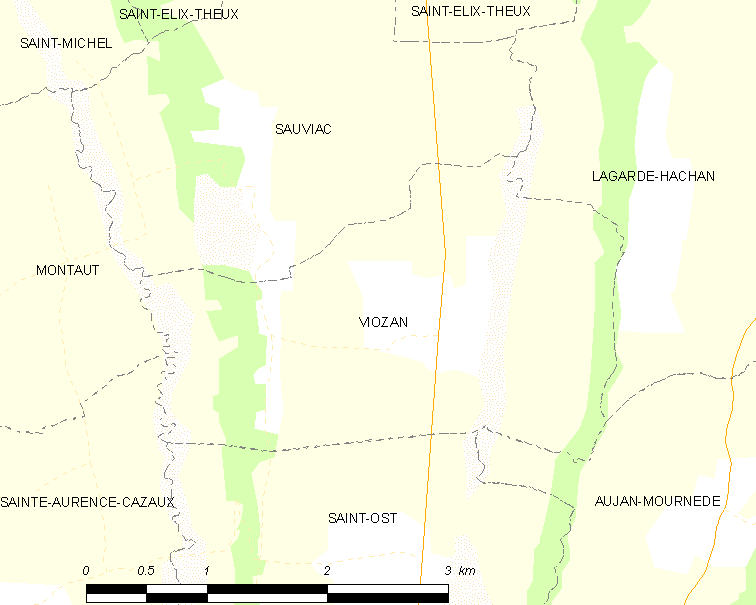
Viozan and its surrounding communes

=== Hydrography ===
The Petite Baïse flows north through the eastern part of the commune, crosses the village and forms part of the commune's northeastern border.

== Population ==
Historical population
| Year | Pop. | ±% p.a. |
|---|---|---|
| 1968 | 131 | — |
| 1975 | 130 | −0.11% |
| 1982 | 134 | +0.43% |
| 1990 | 118 | −1.58% |
| 1999 | 114 | −0.38% |
| 2007 | 121 | +0.75% |
| 2012 | 101 | −3.55% |
| 2017 | 113 | +2.27% |
| 2023 | 92 | −3.37% |
Source: INSEE

== See also ==
- Communes of the Gers department
