= Petite Baïse =

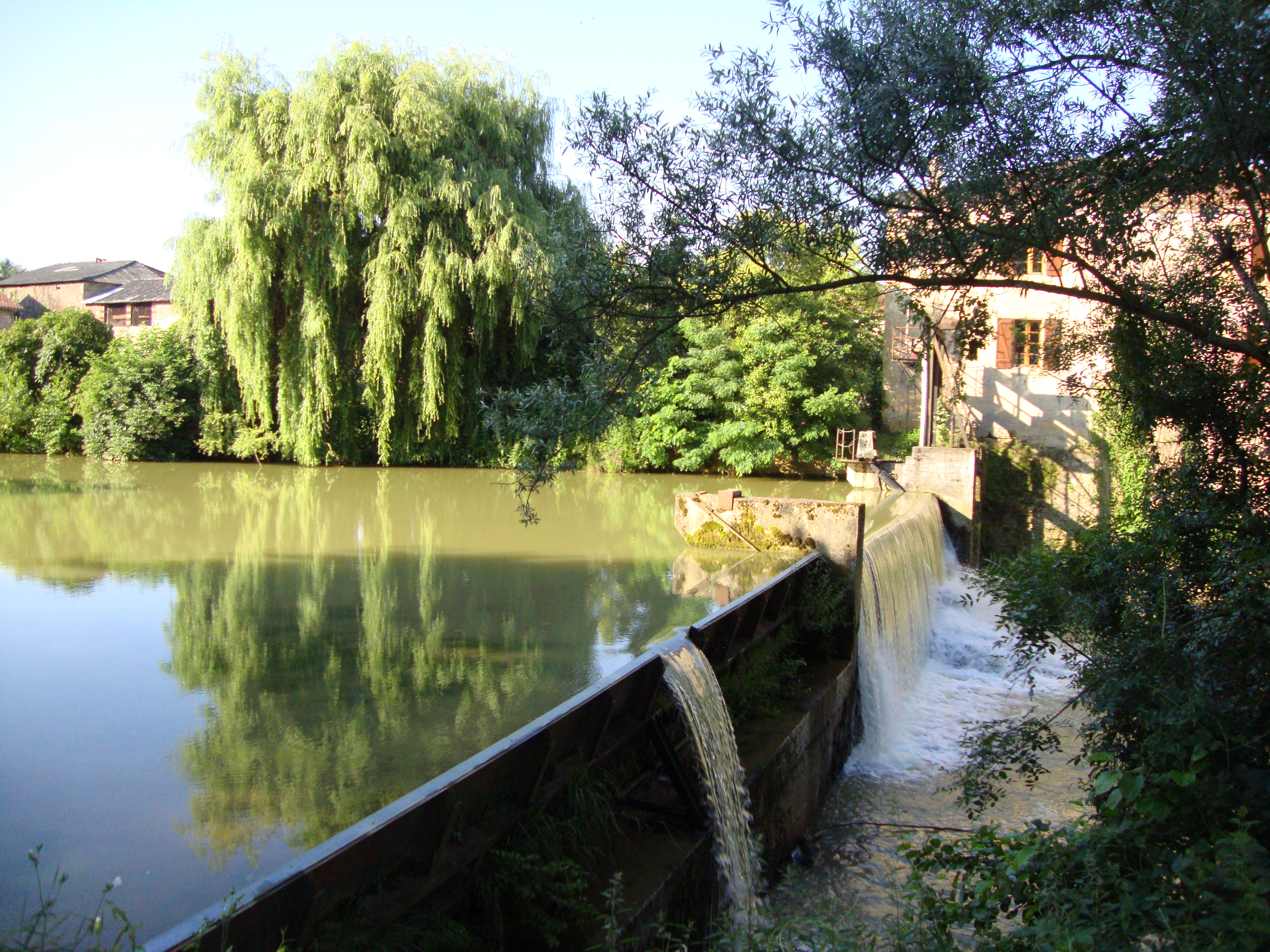

- Location within France Location within Occitanie

Location
- Country: France

Physical characteristics
- Source
  - location: Lannemezan
  - coordinates: 43°06′28″N 00°23′00″E
  - elevation: 615 m (2,018 ft)
- Mouth
  - location: Baïse
  - coordinates: 43°35′16″N 00°24′40″E
  - elevation: 135 m (443 ft)
- Length: 75.0 km (46.6 mi)
- Basin size: 210 km^{2} (81 sq mi)
- Discharge
  - average: 2.39 m^{3}/s (84 cu ft/s)

Basin features
- Progression: Baïse→ Garonne→ Gironde estuary→ Atlantic Ocean

The Petite Baïse (French pronunciation: [pətit ba.iz], literally Little Baïse; Occitan: Petita Baïsa) is a 75.0 km (46.6 mi) long river in the Hautes-Pyrénées and Gers départements, southwestern France. Its source is in Lannemezan, on the plateau de Lannemezan. It flows generally north. It is a right tributary of the Baïse, joining it in l'Isle-de-Noé.

== Départements and communes along its course ==
This list is ordered from source to mouth:

- Hautes-Pyrénées: Lannemezan, Clarens, Campistrous, Galez, Galan, Sabarros, Tournous-Devant, Vieuzos, Betpouey, Hachan, Puntous, Guizerix
- Gers: Saint-Ost, Ponsan-Soubiran, Aujan-Mournède, Viozan, Lagarde-Hachan, Sauviac, Saint-Élix-Theux, Moncassin, Belloc-Saint-Clamens, Saint-Médard, Idrac-Respaillès, Miramont-d'Astarac, Lamazère, L'Isle-de-Noé
