= Puntous =

- Commune
- Coat of arms
- Location of Puntous
- Location within France Location within Occitanie
- Coordinates: 43°18′16″N 0°28′16″E
- Country: France
- Region: Occitania
- Department: Hautes-Pyrénées
- Arrondissement: Tarbes
- Canton: Les Coteaux
- Intercommunality: Pays de Trie et du Magnoac
- Area^{1}: 8.85 km^{2} (3.42 sq mi)
- Elevation: 326 m (1,070 ft)
- Highest elevation: 345 m (1,132 ft)
- Lowest elevation: 241 m (791 ft)
- Population (2023): 177
  - Density: 20.0/km^{2} (51.8/sq mi)
- Time zone: UTC+01:00 (CET)
  - Summer (DST): UTC+02:00 (CEST)
- INSEE/Postal code: 65373 /65230
- ^{1} French Land Register data, which excludes lakes, ponds, glaciers > 1 km^{2} (0.386 sq mi or 247 acres) and river estuaries.

Puntous (Occitan: Puntoses) is a commune in the Hautes-Pyrénées department in south-western France.

== Geography ==
The Petite Baïse forms part of the commune's southern border, flows northward through the middle of the commune, then forms most of the commune's north-western border.

== See also ==
- Communes of the Hautes-Pyrénées department
