= Galez =

- Commune
- Coat of arms
- Location of Galez
- Location within France Location within Occitanie
- Coordinates: 43°11′24″N 0°24′27″E
- Country: France
- Region: Occitania
- Department: Hautes-Pyrénées
- Arrondissement: Bagnères-de-Bigorre
- Canton: La Vallée de l'Arros et des Baïses
- Intercommunality: Plateau de Lannemezan
- Area^{1}: 7.29 km^{2} (2.81 sq mi)
- Elevation: 425 m (1,394 ft)
- Highest elevation: 530 m (1,740 ft)
- Lowest elevation: 360 m (1,180 ft)
- Population (2023): 181
  - Density: 24.8/km^{2} (64.3/sq mi)
- Time zone: UTC+01:00 (CET)
  - Summer (DST): UTC+02:00 (CEST)
- INSEE/Postal code: 65184 /65330
- ^{1} French Land Register data, which excludes lakes, ponds, glaciers > 1 km^{2} (0.386 sq mi or 247 acres) and river estuaries.

Galez is a commune in the Hautes-Pyrénées department in south-western France.

== Geography ==
The Petite Baïse forms most of the commune's south-eastern border, then flows northward through the middle of the commune.

== See also ==
- Communes of the Hautes-Pyrénées department
