= Miramont-d'Astarac =

- Commune
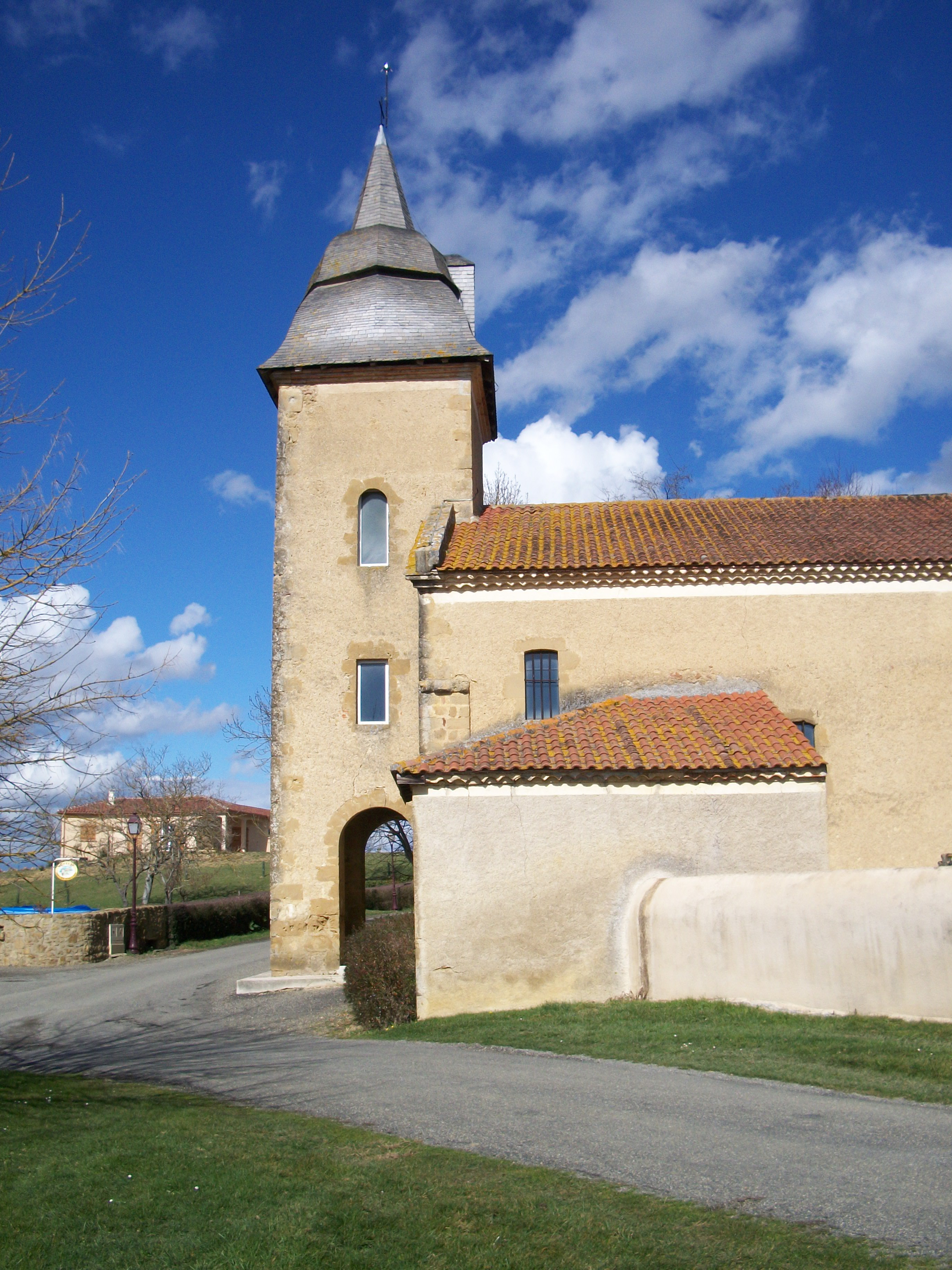
- The church in Miramont-d'Astarac

- Coat of arms
- Location of Miramont-d'Astarac
- Location within France Location within Occitanie
- Coordinates: 43°32′51″N 0°28′12″E
- Country: France
- Region: Occitania
- Department: Gers
- Arrondissement: Mirande
- Canton: Mirande-Astarac

Government
  - Mayor (2020–2026): Christian Falceto
- Area^{1}: 14.73 km^{2} (5.69 sq mi)
- Elevation: 156 m (512 ft)
- Highest elevation: 273 m (896 ft)
- Lowest elevation: 150 m (490 ft)
- Population (2023): 357
  - Density: 24.2/km^{2} (62.8/sq mi)
- Time zone: UTC+01:00 (CET)
  - Summer (DST): UTC+02:00 (CEST)
- INSEE/Postal code: 32254 /32300
- ^{1} French Land Register data, which excludes lakes, ponds, glaciers > 1 km^{2} (0.386 sq mi or 247 acres) and river estuaries.

Miramont-d'Astarac (French pronunciation: [miʁamɔ̃ dastaʁak]; Gascon: Miramont d'Astarac) is a commune in the Gers department in southwestern France.

== Geography ==
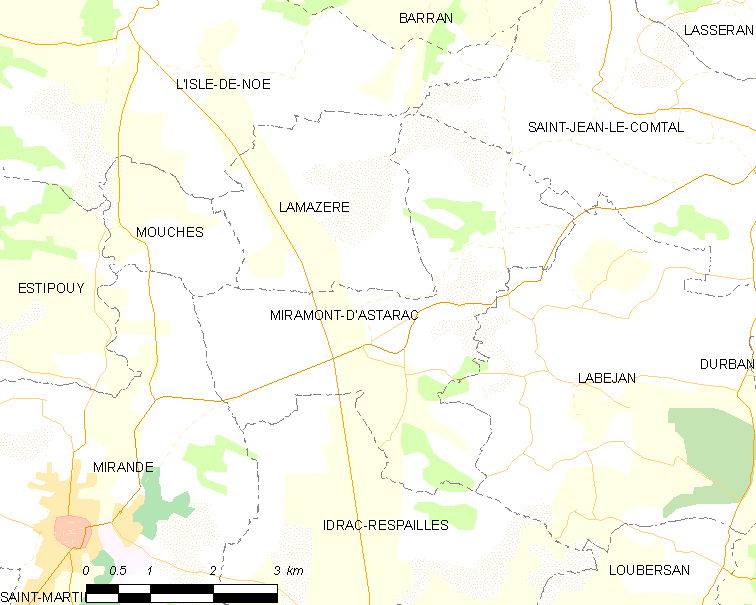
Miramont-d'Astarac and its surrounding communes

The Petite Baïse flows north through the middle of the commune.

== Population ==
Historical population
Year	Pop.	±% p.a.
1968	265	—
1975	223	−2.43%
1982	253	+1.82%
1990	314	+2.74%
1999	344	+1.02%
2007	372	+0.98%
2012	361	−0.60%
2017	347	−0.79%
2023	357	+0.47%
Source: INSEE

== See also ==
- Communes of the Gers department
