= Sauviac, Gers =

Sauviac
- Commune
- Location of Sauviac
- Location within France Location within Occitanie
- Coordinates: 43°24′21″N 0°27′15″E
- Country: France
- Region: Occitania
- Department: Gers
- Arrondissement: Mirande
- Canton: Mirande-Astarac

Government
  - Mayor (2020–2026): Patrick Ducombs
- Area^{1}: 6.48 km^{2} (2.50 sq mi)
- Elevation: 270 m (890 ft)
- Highest elevation: 282 m (925 ft)
- Lowest elevation: 184 m (604 ft)
- Population (2023): 103
  - Density: 15.9/km^{2} (41.2/sq mi)
- Time zone: UTC+01:00 (CET)
  - Summer (DST): UTC+02:00 (CEST)
- INSEE/Postal code: 32419 /32300
- ^{1} French Land Register data, which excludes lakes, ponds, glaciers > 1 km^{2} (0.386 sq mi or 247 acres) and river estuaries.

Sauviac (French pronunciation: [sovjak]) is a commune in the Gers department in southwestern France.

== Geography ==
=== Localisation ===
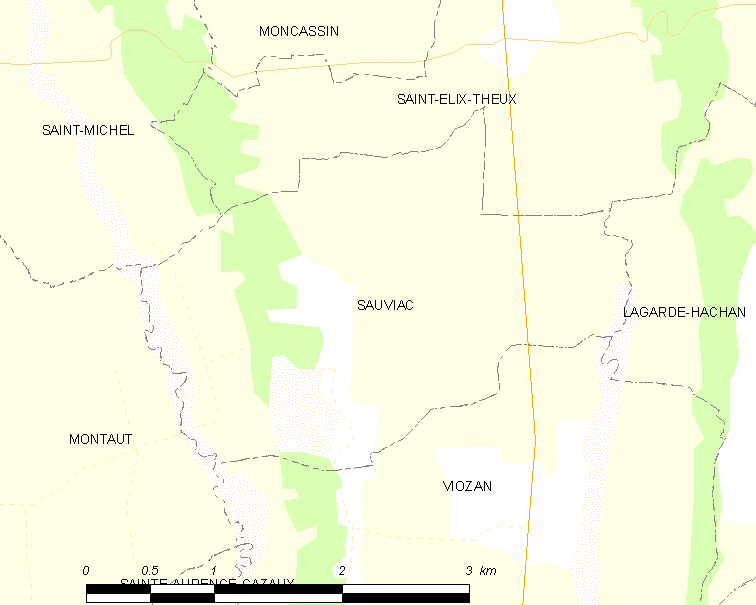
Sauviac and its surrounding communes

=== Hydrology ===
The Petite Baïse forms part of the commune's eastern border.

== Population ==
Historical population
| Year | Pop. | ±% p.a. |
|---|---|---|
| 1968 | 148 | — |
| 1975 | 144 | −0.39% |
| 1982 | 130 | −1.45% |
| 1990 | 132 | +0.19% |
| 1999 | 134 | +0.17% |
| 2007 | 113 | −2.11% |
| 2012 | 111 | −0.36% |
| 2017 | 108 | −0.55% |
| 2023 | 103 | −0.79% |
Source: INSEE

== See also ==
- Communes of the Gers department
