= L'Isle-de-Noé =

- Commune
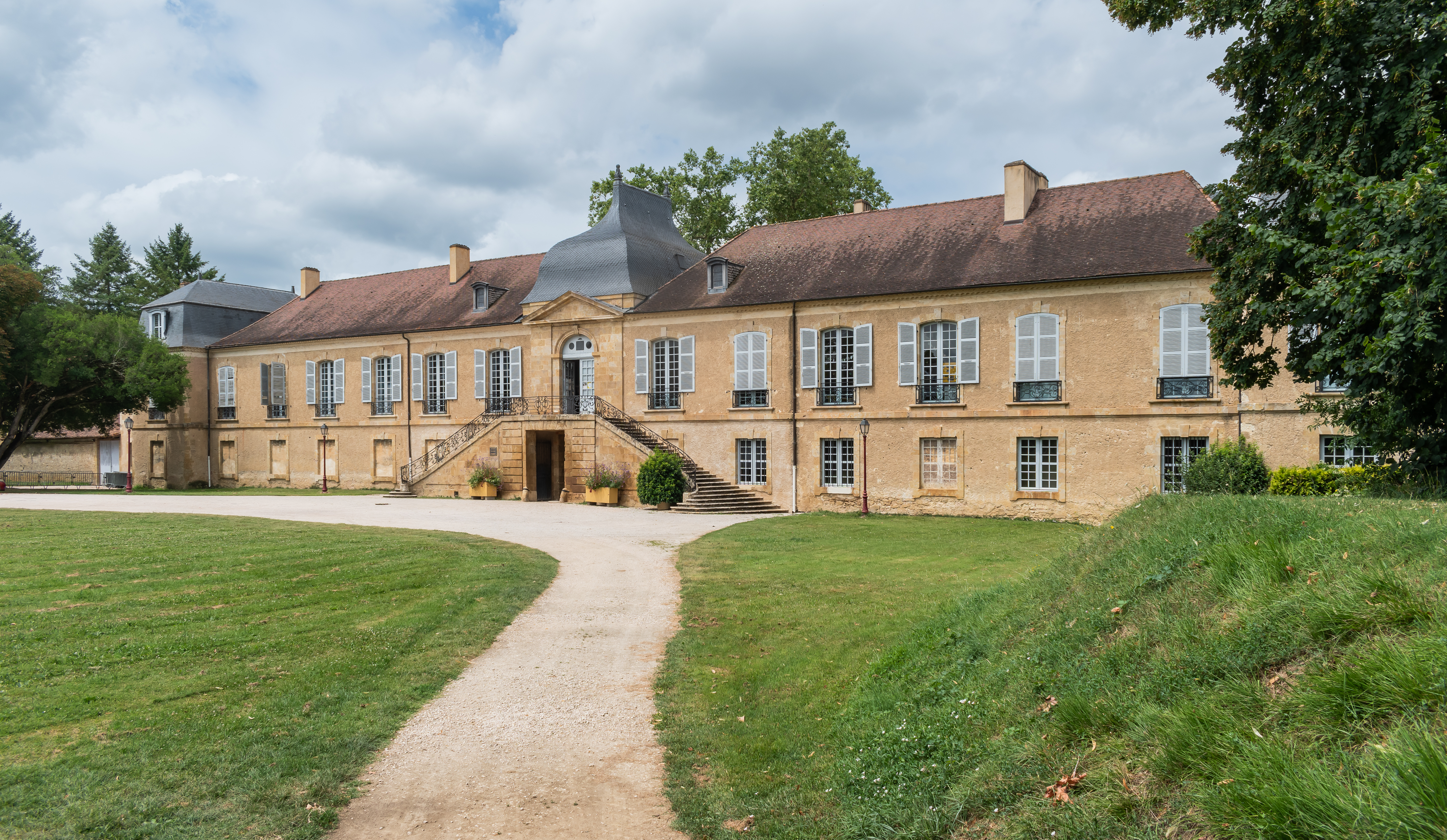
- Chateau

- Coat of arms
- Location of L'Isle-de-Noé
- Location within France Location within Occitanie
- Coordinates: 43°35′15″N 0°24′48″E
- Country: France
- Region: Occitania
- Department: Gers
- Arrondissement: Mirande
- Canton: Pardiac-Rivière-Basse

Government
  - Mayor (2020–2026): Jean-Jacques Ortholan
- Area^{1}: 25.66 km^{2} (9.91 sq mi)
- Elevation: 142 m (466 ft)
- Highest elevation: 283 m (928 ft)
- Lowest elevation: 125 m (410 ft)
- Population (2023): 529
  - Density: 20.6/km^{2} (53.4/sq mi)
- Time zone: UTC+01:00 (CET)
  - Summer (DST): UTC+02:00 (CEST)
- INSEE/Postal code: 32159 /32300
- ^{1} French Land Register data, which excludes lakes, ponds, glaciers > 1 km^{2} (0.386 sq mi or 247 acres) and river estuaries.

L'Isle-de-Noé (French pronunciation: [l il də nɔe]; Occitan: L'Ila d'Arbeishan) is a commune in the Gers department in southwestern France.

== Geography ==
The Petite Baïse forms part of the commune's southeastern border, flows northwest through the middle of the commune, then flows into the Baïse in the village.

The Baïse forms part of the commune's southern border, flows north through the middle of the commune, then forms part of its northern border.

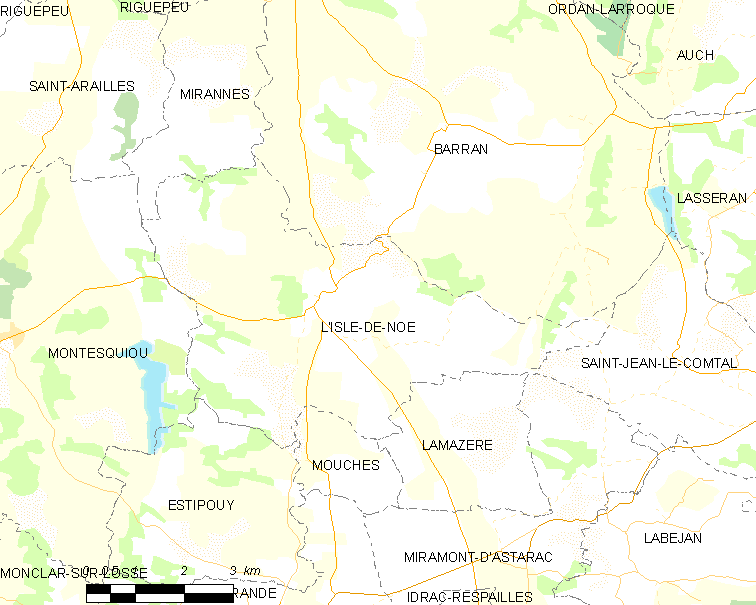
L'Isle-de-Noé and its surrounding communes

== Population ==
Historical population
Year	Pop.	±% p.a.
1968	567	—
1975	528	−1.01%
1982	564	+0.95%
1990	490	−1.74%
1999	443	−1.11%
2007	525	+2.15%
2012	537	+0.45%
2017	543	+0.22%
2023	529	−0.43%
Source: INSEE

== See also ==
- Communes of the Gers department
- Louis-Pantaléon de Noé
