= Vinicius para Crianças - Arca de Noé =

- Based on: A Arca de Noé by Vinicius de Moraes
- Directed by: Ewaldo Ruy; Augusto César Vannucci
- Starring: Aretha Marcos; Milton Nascimento; Chico Buarque; Fábio Jr. Alceu Valença; Bebel Gilberto; Moraes Moreira; MPB4; Ney Matogrosso; Marina Lima; Boca Livre; As Frenéticas; Martim Francisco; Walter Franco; Elis Regina; Toquinho; Rogério Duprat
- Theme music composer: A Arca, by Milton Nascimento
- Country of origin: Brazil
- Original language: Portuguese
- No. of episodes: 1

Production
- Producer: Marny Elwis
- Editor: Antonio Vilela

Original release
- Network: Rede Globo
- Release: 10 October 1980

Vinicius para Crianças - Arca de Noé was a Brazilian musical program directed by Ewaldo Ruy and Augusto César Vannucci. It was aired originally on October 10, 1980 on TV Globo.

== Production ==
The set designer Federico Padilla created ample spaces, set up at the Teatro Fênix, in the Jardim Botânico neighborhood, in Rio de Janeiro, allowing a great movement of musicians and actors on stage.

The stage set also made use of some effects, such as chromakey - a feature that allows the image captured by one camera to be inserted over another, creating the foreground and background impression. Thus it was possible to create a playful atmosphere, reinforcing the poetry of Vinicius de Moraes.

== Musical Numbers ==
Song	Performer(s)
"A Arca"	Milton Nascimento and Chico Buarque
"A Porta"	Fábio Jr.
"A Foca"	Alceu Valença
"A Pulga"	Bebel Gilberto
"As Abelhas"	Moraes Moreira
"O Pato"	MPB4
"São Francisco"	Ney Matogrosso
"O Gato"	Marina Lima
"A Casa"	Boca Livre
"Aula de Piano"	As Frenéticas and Martim Francisco
"O Relógio"	Walter Franco
"A Corujinha"	Elis Regina
"Menininha"	Toquinho

== Awards ==
Year	Award	Category	Result
1981	9th International Emmy Awards	Popular Arts	Won
1981	Premios Ondas	Best TV show of the year	Won
1981	Iris Award	Best Foreign Program	Won
1982	APCA Awards	Best Musical Program	Won
