= Idrac-Respaillès =

- Commune
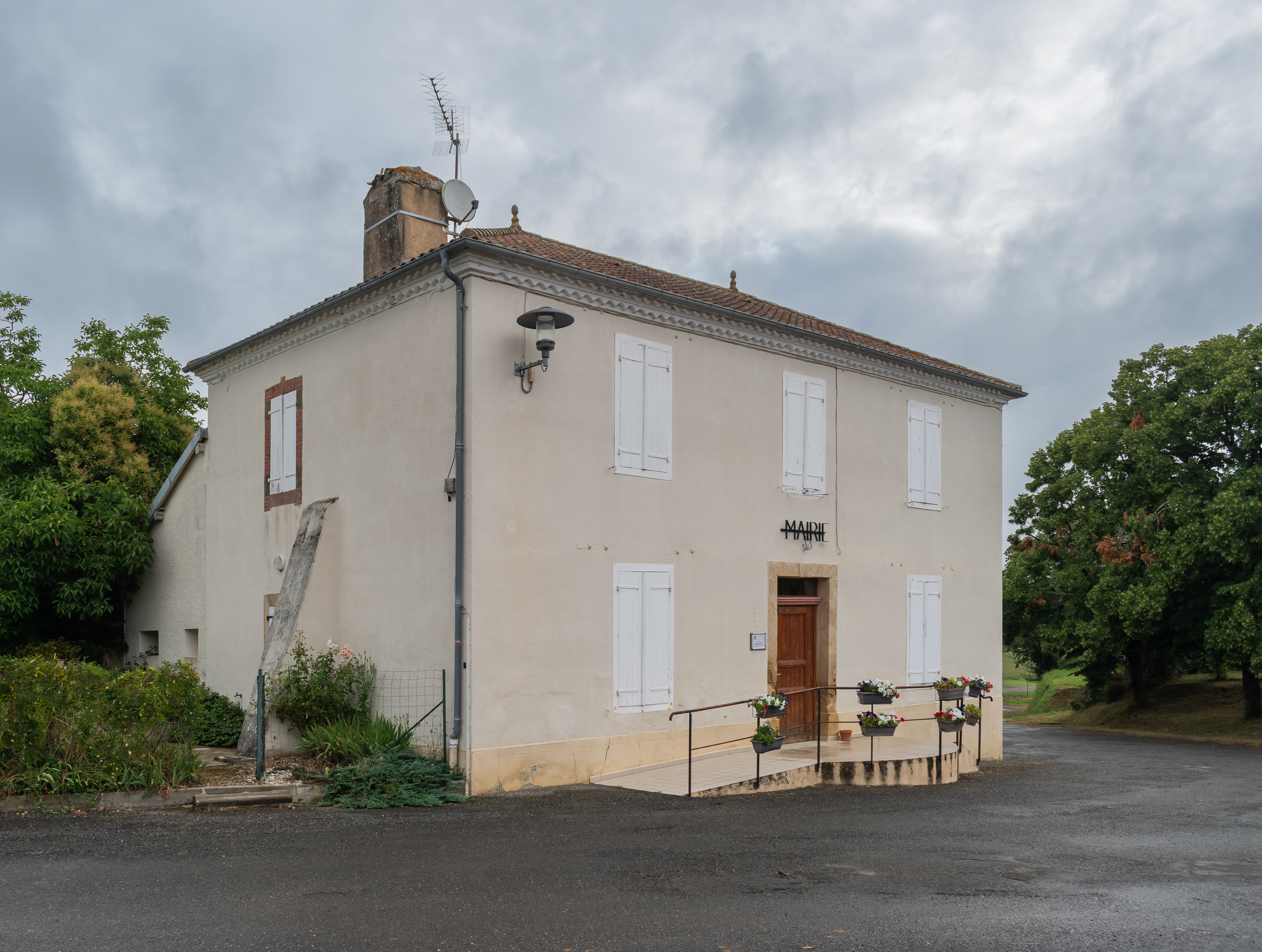
- Town hall of Idrac-Respailles
- Location of Idrac-Respaillès
- Location within France Location within Occitanie
- Coordinates: 43°31′31″N 0°27′30″E
- Country: France
- Region: Occitania
- Department: Gers
- Arrondissement: Mirande
- Canton: Mirande-Astarac
- Intercommunality: Astarac Arros en Gascogne

Government
  - Mayor (2020–2026): Nicole Laberenne
- Area^{1}: 13.03 km^{2} (5.03 sq mi)
- Elevation: 250 m (820 ft)
- Highest elevation: 266 m (873 ft)
- Lowest elevation: 155 m (509 ft)
- Population (2023): 212
  - Density: 16.3/km^{2} (42.1/sq mi)
- Time zone: UTC+01:00 (CET)
  - Summer (DST): UTC+02:00 (CEST)
- INSEE/Postal code: 32156 /32300
- ^{1} French Land Register data, which excludes lakes, ponds, glaciers > 1 km^{2} (0.386 sq mi or 247 acres) and river estuaries.

Idrac-Respaillès (French pronunciation: [idʁak ʁɛspajɛs]; Occitan: Idrac e Hrespalhers) is a commune in the Gers department in southwestern France.

== Geography ==
The Petite Baïse flows north through the middle of the commune, then forms its northeastern border.

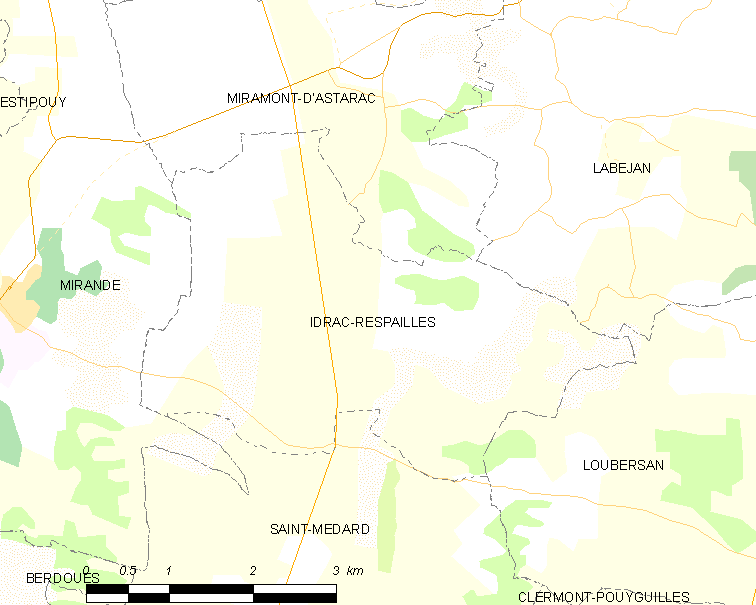
Idrac-Respaillès and its surrounding communes

== Population ==
Historical population
Year	Pop.	±% p.a.
1968	195	—
1975	182	−0.98%
1982	188	+0.46%
1990	186	−0.13%
1999	201	+0.87%
2007	205	+0.25%
2012	213	+0.77%
2017	214	+0.09%
2023	212	−0.16%
Source: INSEE

== See also ==
- Communes of the Gers department
