= Louis-Pantaléon de Noé =

- Born: 8 November 1728; Cap-Haïtien
- Died: 25 February 1816 (aged 87); 10th arrondissement of Paris
- Children: Louis-Pantaléon-Jude-Amédée de Noé

Louis-Pantaléon de Noé, Count of Noé, (November 8 or December 22, 1728 – February 25, 1816) was a Creole–French general and peer. The son of a Gascon officer and a Creole landowner, he grew up in the colony of Saint-Domingue before serving as an officer during the War of the Austrian Succession and then the Seven Years' War. He later returned to Saint-Domingue to manage his plantations, where hundreds of slaves produced coffee and especially sugar.

Returning to Gascony, he lived the life of a grand lord while having his plantations in Saint-Domingue managed. He emigrated during the Revolution and returned to France in 1802. Financially strained, he sought help from a former slave of one of his family's plantations, Toussaint Louverture, who had become the hero of the Haitian Revolution.

In his later life, he became a lieutenant general and a peer of France during the Restoration. After his death, his family maintained the memory of his relationship with Toussaint Louverture. In Victor Hugo's novel Bug-Jargal, many details allow the identification of the two main characters as Louis-Pantaléon de Noé and Toussaint Louverture.

== Biography ==
=== Family and Childhood in Saint-Domingue (1728-1740) ===
Louis-Pantaléon de Noé was born on November 8, 1728, according to his military record, or on December 22, 1728, as he himself indicated under the First Empire. There might be confusion between the date of birth and the baptism date. His mother likely gave birth in the "big house" of the Bréda plantation in Haut-du-Cap, owned by his grandparents, in Cap-Français, in the French colony of Saint-Domingue.

Louis-Pantaléon de Noé was the son of Jean-Louis de Noé (1691-1730) and his wife Marie-Anne de Bréda (1708-1761). Jean-Louis de Noé, commonly known as Louis, came from an ancient noble family of Gascony, the Noés, lords of L'Isle-de-Noé, allied notably with the Colberts and the Pardaillan de Gondrins. Louis de Noé had an elder brother, Marc-Roger de Noé, heir to the marquisate of Noé.

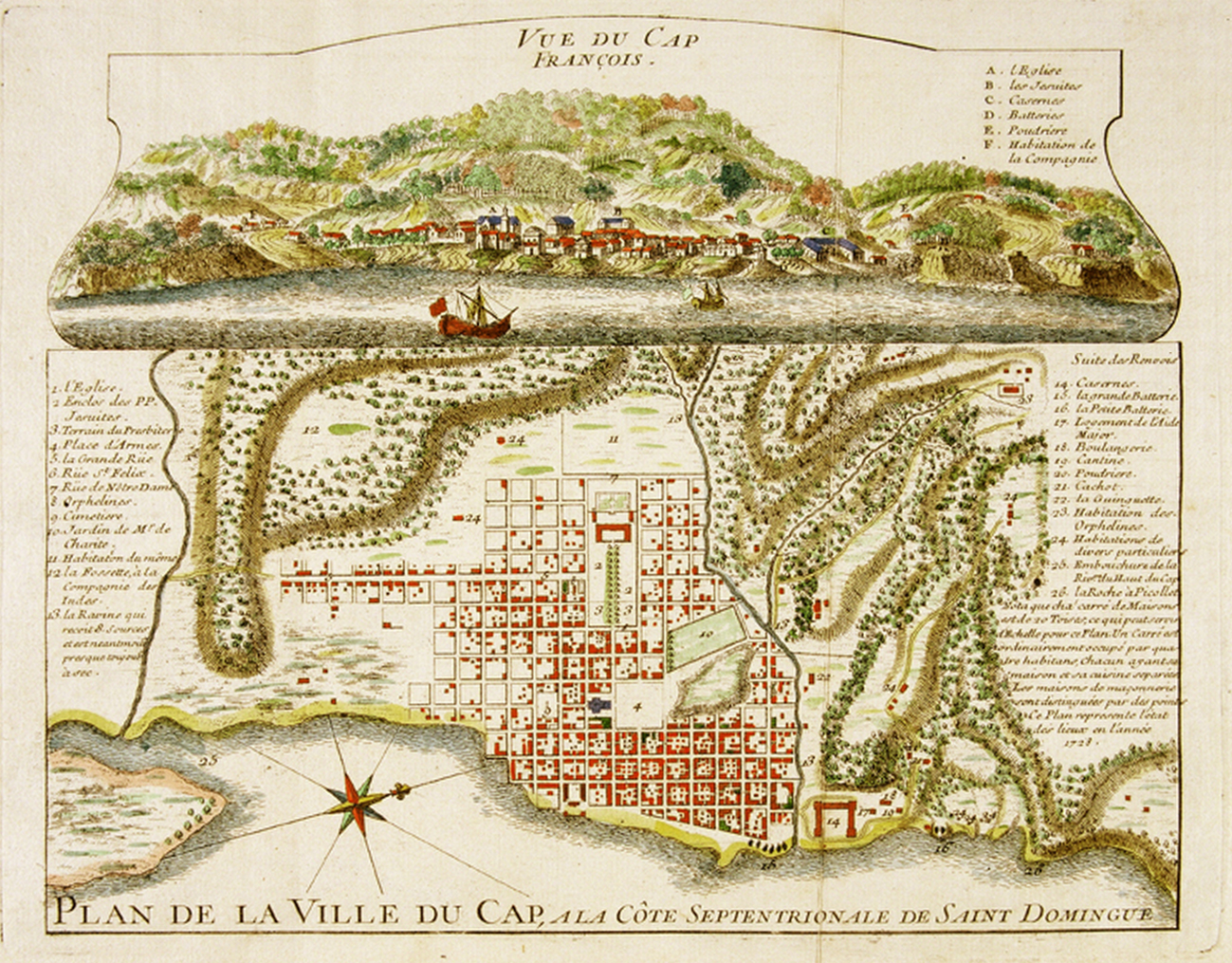
View and plan of Cap-Français in 1728.

Jean-Louis de Noé held the title of count and began a career as a naval officer, which brought him to Cap-Français, Saint-Domingue, where he married Marie-Anne de Bréda by contract signed on November 27, 1725. She was the daughter of Pantaléon I de Bréda, who left her a plantation located in the Limbé district, west of Cap-Français, where about fifty slaves worked. It was thus a marriage between a younger Gascon with a prestigious name but relatively little wealth and a Creole heiress.

The newborn Louis-Pantaléon was entrusted to the care of a black slave nurse, Madeleine, whom we know from a gift he made to her forty-seven years later, in 1775, when she had become free through manumission. On December 21, 1730, Jean-Louis de Noé died from a sword blow received from another officer during a drunken dispute.

Until the age of 8 and his departure for metropolitan France in March 1737, Louis-Pantaléon de Noé grew up on his native island. Then his mother, Marie-Anne Bréda de Noé, took her two children, Louis-Pantaléon and his younger sister, Marie-Anne, with her. She first settled in Paris, then in Auch, and remotely managed her properties in Saint-Domingue. Her son began his military career in 1740, when he was not yet twelve years old.

=== Officer (1740-1773) ===
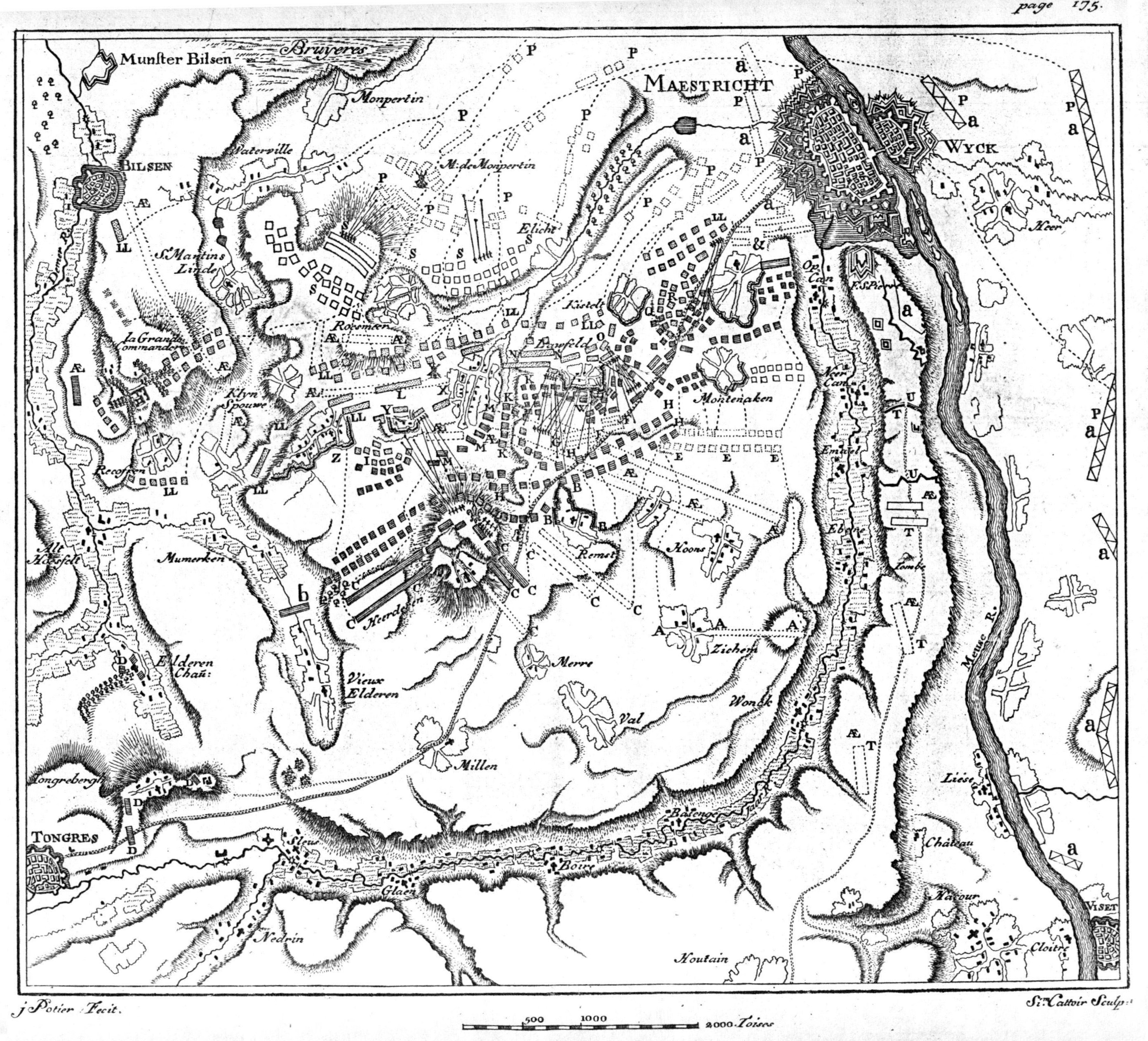
Plan of the Battle of Lauffeld.

On June 6, 1740, at the age of eleven, Louis-Pantaléon de Noé became a second lieutenant in the infantry regiment of Noailles. He was promoted to ensign on November 1, 1741, and then to lieutenant on December 9, 1742, in the same regiment.

As the War of the Austrian Succession began at the end of 1740, young Louis-Pantaléon experienced his first combat during the Battle of Dettingen on June 27, 1743, a French defeat during which he was slightly wounded. In 1744, he participated in the sieges of the cities of Ypres, Menin, and Freiburg-im-Breisgau, during which he was wounded again. On February 19, 1745, Louis-Pantaléon de Noé became a cavalry captain in the La Viefville regiment. He fought in Italy in 1746 (battles of Tidone, Tanaro, and Piacenza) and in Flanders in 1747 at the Battle of Lauffeld, during which he received a new injury. After the Treaty of Aix-la-Chapelle, he remained a cavalry captain.

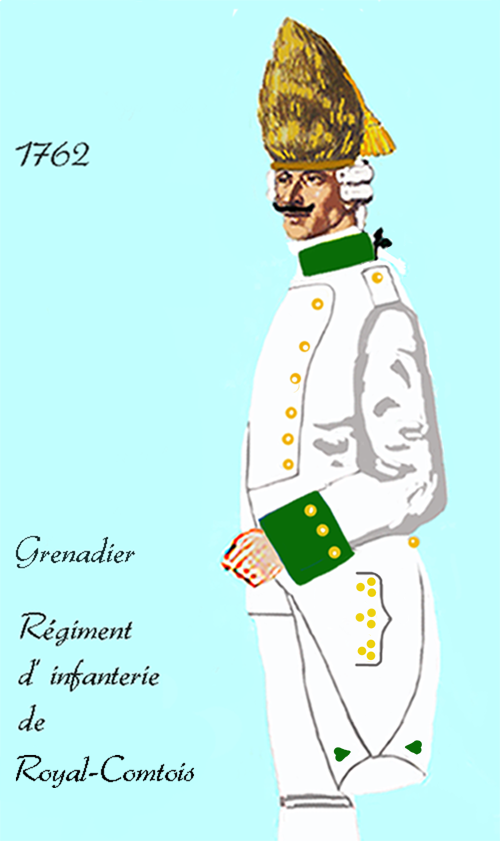
Grenadier of the Royal-Comtois regiment in 1762.

In June 1756, he received the cross of Knight of the Royal and Military Order of Saint Louis from King Louis XV at Versailles. It's unclear what connections he may have had to receive such a considerable honor. He then continued his military career in the Gendarmerie of France, the elite units that protected the king. During the Seven Years' War, he was seriously wounded during the Battle of Minden and remained disabled, as he wrote in a letter: "having spent the entire war in the gendarmerie, wounded badly enough to be crippled and able to serve in the cavalry only with difficulty." On February 1, 1762, he became a colonel of infantry, indicating that he had the means to purchase a regiment, the Royal-Comtois Infantry regiment. This regiment was assigned to the surveillance of the Atlantic and Mediterranean coasts.

In 1769, he obtained permission to leave his regiment, entrusting it to Lieutenant Colonel La Motte-Geffrard, to focus on his private affairs in the colony of Saint-Domingue, where he arrived in the second half of the year. His regiment, sent to the Isle of France, now Mauritius, mutinied. The leaders were judged in July 1773, and on July 28, 1773, Count de Noé, then in Saint-Domingue, was relieved of his command in favor of Stanislas-Catherine de Biaudos de Castéja.

=== Aristocratic planter (1769-1775) ===
The settlements of the Bréda and their allies around 1750.

Louis-Pantaléon de Noé's mother, Marie-Anne de Bréda, died in Toulouse on August 24, 1761, leaving her property to Louis-Pantaléon and his sister Marie-Anne. She had already sold her Limbé plantation and bequeathed to her children a sugar plantation called Les Manquets, shares in a tile factory and a pottery, all in Cap-Français, as well as significant debts. In 1765, Louis-Pantaléon's sister renounced her inheritance in his favor. He entrusted the management to merchants established in Saint-Domingue before coming himself in 1769.

Upon arriving in Saint-Domingue, Count de Noé settled in the city of Cap-Français, where he cultivated social relations with other members of the white upper class, notably François-Antoine Bayon de Libertat, who managed the Bréda plantations then owned by Pantaléon II de Bréda, Louis-Pantaléon's uncle.

In 1772, Louis-Pantaléon de Noé formed a partnership with one of his cousins, Louis-François-Pantaléon du Trousset, chevalier d'Héricourt. They pooled their assets from Les Manquets, creating the Héricourt-Noé plantation located next to Cap-Français, in the Acul-du-Nord district. It was a large sugar plantation, covering about 700 hectares, one of the largest in the region. Sugarcane was cultivated, crushed (in mills), and transformed into sugar (through heating) by slaves, through exhausting labor. In 1774, the two partners owned over 400 slaves on their plantation.

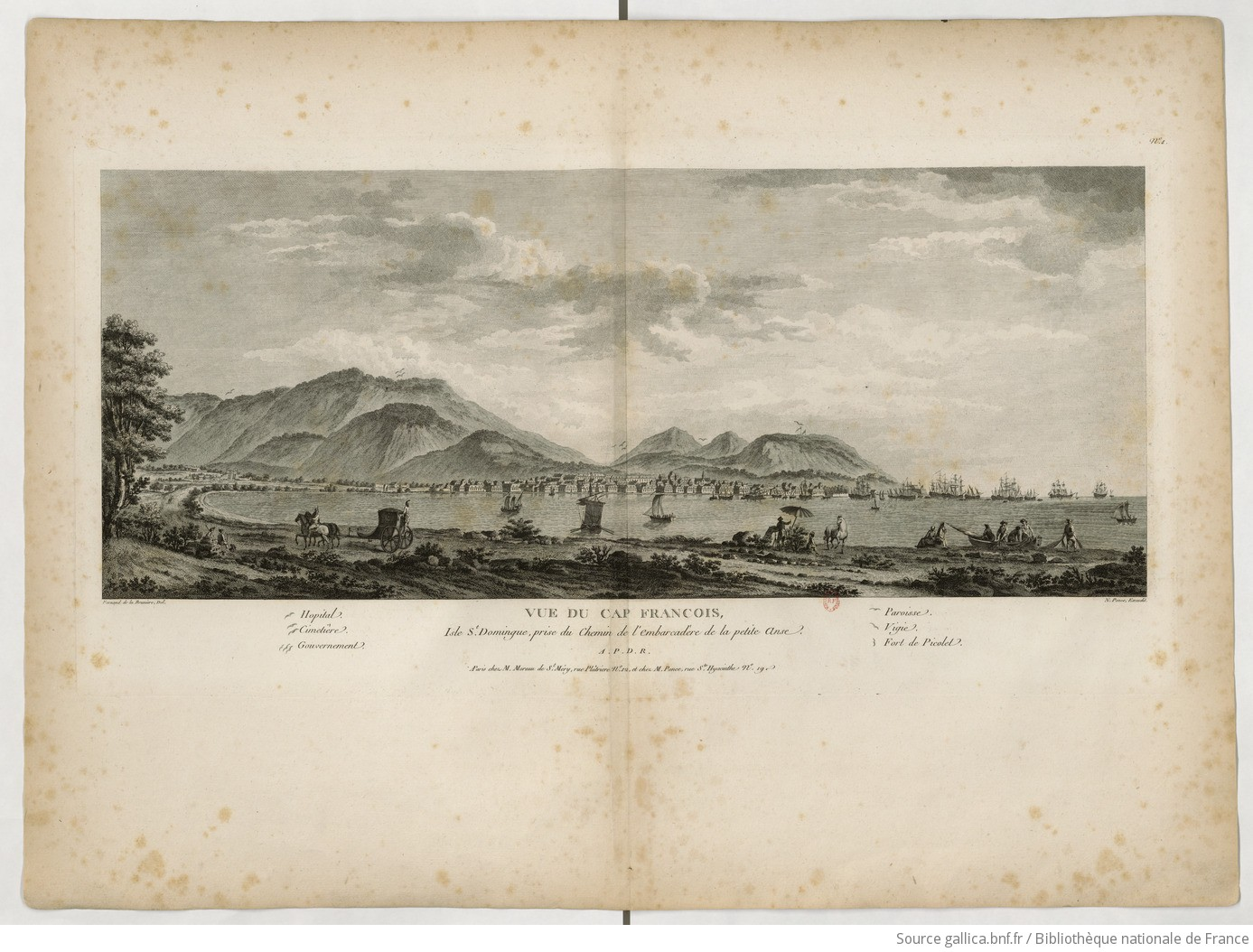
Cap-Haïtien in 1791. Engraving extracted from the Collection of Views of the Main Places of the French Colony of Saint-Domingue by Moreau de Saint-Méry. The Bréda plantation of Haut-du-Cap was located at the foot of the hills, to the left of this illustration.

During his stay in Saint-Domingue, Louis-Pantaléon de Noé also interacted with free people of color, the most famous being Toussaint Bréda, who later took the name Toussaint Louverture when he became the hero of the Haitian Revolution. Toussaint was a slave on the Bréda plantation before being emancipated, either by Count de Noé himself or by Bayon de Libertat, who managed the Bréda plantation. The tradition that reports Toussaint as the slave of Louis-Pantaléon de Noé is incorrect, as he did not own the Bréda plantation at that time; it belonged to his uncle. Among Louis-Pantaléon's servants was Blaise Bréda, a "free person of color," who was his cook and owned two houses and slaves himself.

Once their financial situation was restored, the two associated cousins considered returning to France. The allure of the metropolis, the boredom of a monotonous life, and the constant fear of a possible revolt by the slaves on their plantation, who outnumbered the whites by far, likely explained this decision. Before leaving, they chose two trusted men to manage their plantation: a proxy, authorized to act on their behalf, Antoine-Alexis Mosneron de Launay, and a steward, a kind of accountant, Charles de Lépinaist. They arrived in the metropolis on July 29, 1775.

=== Absentee landowner (1775-1791) ===
In April 1778, Count de Noé and his cousin, the Chevalier d'Héricourt, bought two coffee plantations from their attorney for Les Manquets, Mosneron de Launay, this time located on the hills of Port-Margot. These two plantations totaled 136 plots of land and nearly fifty slaves, almost all recently deported from Africa (known as "Bossales"), except for one native of Saint-Domingue. The Chevalier d'Héricourt returned to Saint-Domingue two months later, realizing that this purchase turned out to be a bad deal, and, upset, parted ways with Mosneron de Launay at Les Manquets. Louis-Pantaléon de Noé also returned in 1778 but stayed in Saint-Domingue for a very short time. The two partners quickly sold their coffee plantations.

The Chevalier d'Héricourt took charge of the direction of the sugar plantation at Les Manquets but fell ill and died on August 25, 1779. The plantation passed entirely to Count de Noé, who compensated the other rightful heirs. He entrusted the management to three successive attorneys. First, from 1779 to 1789, François-Antoine Bayon de Libertat, the same one as at the Bréda plantation. He was dismissed for mismanagement in 1789. His successor was Jean-Jacques-Philippe Langlois de Laheuse until April 1790. At that date, a new attorney was appointed, Joseph-Nicolas Duménil, who managed the plantation until the slave revolt of August 1791.

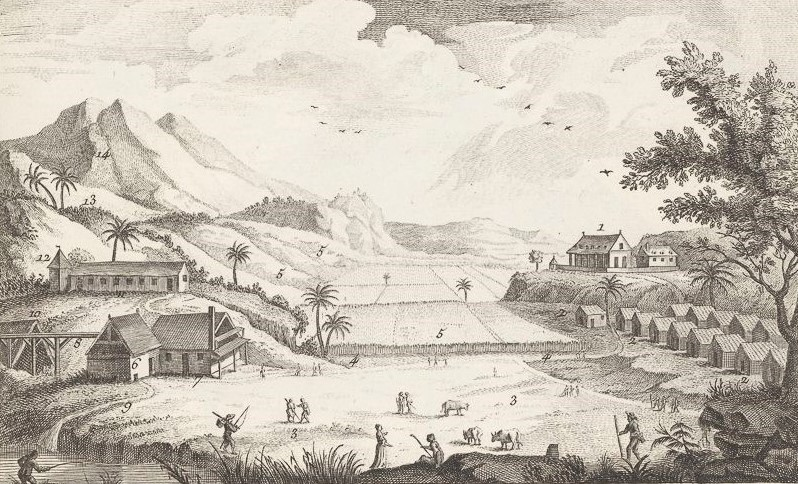
A sugarcane plantation house in 1762. Illustration in the Encyclopedia. In the top right, the master's house, overlooking Rue Cases-Nègres below (slave quarter). On the left, buildings for sugar production: water mill, connected to the sugar mill housing the boilers. Above, the purging house and the drying room, for refining and drying sugar. In the center, in the foreground, the "savannah", uncultivated part of the plantation, and in the background the sugarcane fields. The work of the slaves is not represented.

During this period, the sugar cane planted area in the Les Manquets plantation increased from about 200 hectares in 1780 to nearly 340 hectares in 1791. The annual sugar production varied from about 180 tons in 1780 to approximately 260 tons in other years. The plantation yielded at least 30,000 pounds per year to Count de Noé.

Sources do not allow us to precisely know the experience of the slaves, but it appears that they were poorly fed, mainly on bananas, vegetables, and other starchy foods, poorly dressed, and housed in economically constructed huts, subjected to exhausting work for which they were not numerous enough. Consequently, they had precarious health, and epidemics seemed frequent. The slaves resisted as best they could, including engaging in temporary or longer-term escape attempts. Bayon de Libertat, in his letters to Count de Noé, claimed to promote childbirth among slave women, which allowed for the renewal of the workforce at a lower cost than purchasing Bossales from the slave trade.

In 1786, upon the death of his uncle Pantaléon II de Bréda, Count de Noé inherited, in joint ownership with his sister Marie-Anne de Noé de Polastron, his cousin Louis-Bénigne-Pantaléon du Trousset, Count d'Héricourt, and his cousin Julie du Trousset d'Héricourt de Butler, the two Bréda plantations, one in Haut-du-Cap in Cap-Français, and the other in Plaine-du-Nord. These were two sugar plantations, where more than 360 slaves worked in total, three-quarters of whom were adults born in Africa. These plantations were managed, like Les Manquets, by Bayon de Libertat, whose trusted man was Toussaint Bréda. After Bayon de Libertat's dismissal in 1789, who seemed to prioritize the management of his own sugar mill located in Limbé, it appeared that irrigation works and the construction of new mills were necessary. Like at Les Manquets, small-scale maroonage was endemic to the Bréda plantations.

It seems that it was in Count de Noé's plantation at Les Manquets that the Saint-Domingue slave revolt began on the night of August 22–23, 1791.

=== Gascon Grand Lord (1775-1789) ===
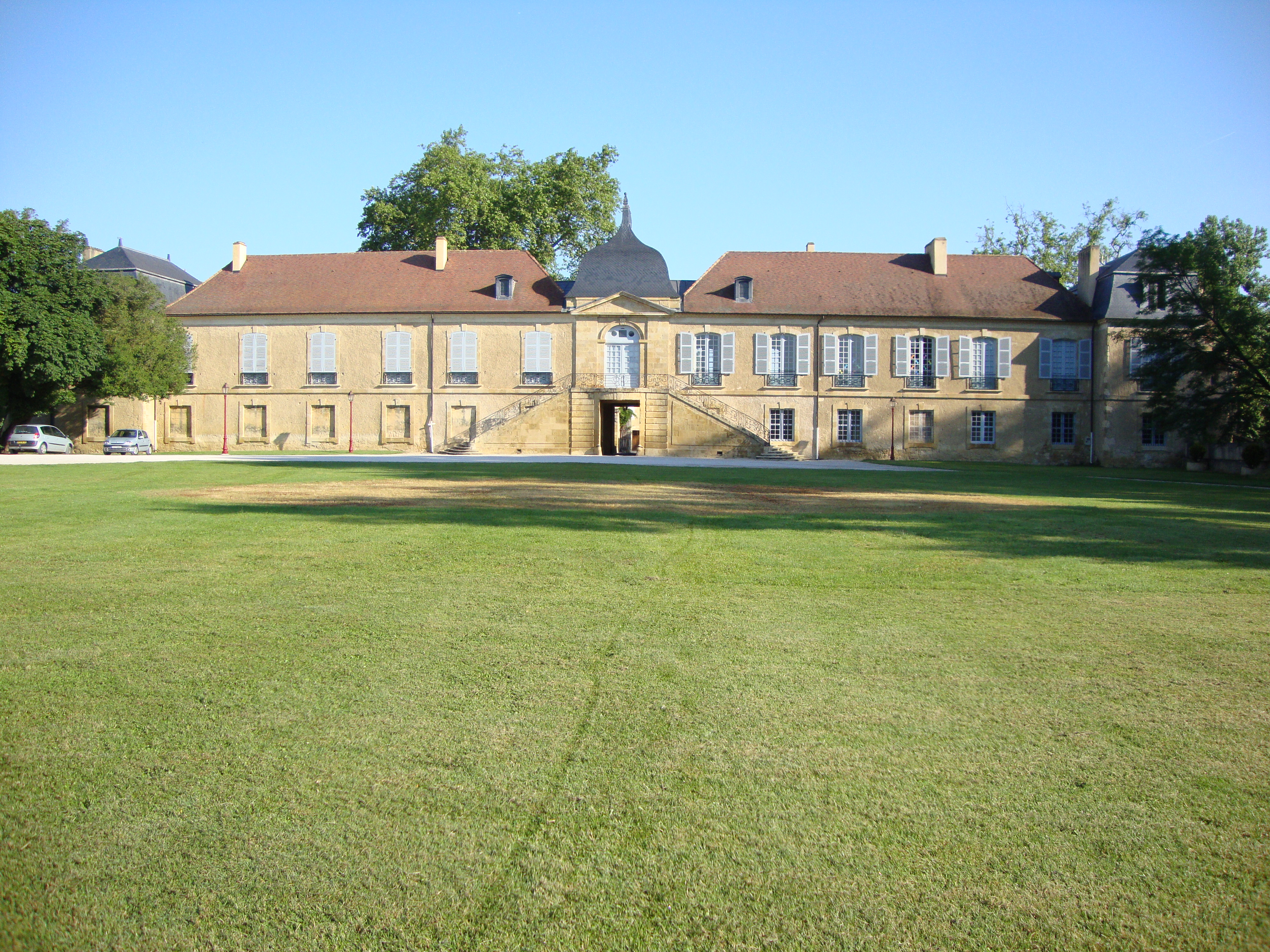
Castle of L'Isle-de-Noé.

The year following his return to metropolitan France, Louis-Pantaléon de Noé married his cousin, Charlotte-Louise-Pétronille de Noé, who had just become a widow. The marriage contract was signed at the chateau of L'Isle-de-Noé on January 24, 1776, and the ceremony took place two weeks later, on February 10, 1776, in the village church. At 47 years old, Louis-Pantaléon de Noé married a young woman of 26. She was the daughter of Marquis Jacques-Roger de Noé (1716-1800), himself a first cousin of Louis-Pantaléon, their fathers being brothers. This marriage, which united two branches of the family, ensured the future of the name. Louis-Pantaléon and Charlotte de Noé lived in the residential chateau of L'Isle-de-Noé, an inheritance of Charlotte, probably completed in 1756. In seven years, they had six children.

In addition to the couple Louis-Pantaléon and Charlotte de Noé and their children, the old Marquis Jacques-Roger de Noé and his unmarried sister, Jeanne-Louise de Noé, also lived in the chateau of L'Isle-de-Noé. Their brothers Marc-Antoine de Noé, bishop of Lescar, and Viscount Louis de Noé, visited regularly. The Noés were served by staff, their chateau was furnished with beautiful furniture, and they enjoyed good food. Count de Noé developed horse breeding in the park of his chateau.

Count de Noé was the Baron of L'Isle-de-Noé, a lordship that his family had owned since the sixteenth century, consisting of L'Isle-de-Noé and the neighboring villages of Mouchès, Castagnère, and Saubagnan. He also owned the Viscounty of Estancarbon in Comminges. In 1787, he bought the barony of Antin, that is, the former ducal peerage of Antin, which became a barony again after the death in 1757 of the last Duke of Antin, Louis de Pardaillan de Gondrin.

The Noés had connections at the Court. Indeed, Gabrielle de Polignac, wife of Jules de Polignac and friend of Queen Marie-Antoinette, was the daughter of a first marriage of Jean-François Gabriel de Polastron, later remarried to Marie-Anne de Noé, sister of Count Louis-Pantaléon de Noé. The Noés were part of the nobility imbued with its privileges and did not understand that they could be questioned.

Despite his enviable situation, Count de Noé faced financial difficulties. The American War of Independence disrupted trade relations between Saint-Domingue and the metropolis. Various debts remained unsettled and prolonged, and new ones were contracted.

In 1787, Count de Noé participated in the provincial assembly of the Generalité of Auch. He was appointed by the king as a representative of the nobility.

=== Choosing emigration (1789-1802) ===
In the spring of 1789, unlike other members of his family, Count de Noé did not participate in the local meetings of the Gascon nobility that drafted the grievances. His concerns were elsewhere. In 1787-1788, he made frequent trips to Paris to defend his interests as a planter in Saint-Domingue. He participated in the "colonial committee" composed of large landowners. Contrary to their demands, King Louis XVI, in his convocation of the Estates-General, did not foresee deputies from the colonies. Nonetheless, the colonial committee organized illegal elections in Saint-Domingue: on January 27, 1789, a general assembly of white notables from the north of the island elected deputies to the Estates-General, including Count de Noé.

At the opening of the Estates-General on May 5, 1789, the colonial deputies were not admitted. The National Assembly accepted six representatives from Saint-Domingue at its session on July 4, 1789, but Count de Noé was not among them. In 1789-1790, he was at his chateau of L'Isle-de-Noé with his family. Unlike many of his relatives and allies, he did not participate in the club at the Hôtel de Massiac, a society of wealthy colonists who fought against the rights of the Black population.

In 1791, after the flight to Varennes and the arrest of the king, Louis-Pantaléon de Noé emigrated from France, leaving his wife, the rightful owner of the chateau, at L'Isle-de-Noé. Around mid-October, news of the slave revolt in Saint-Domingue reached France. At the same time, in the fall of 1791, Louis-Pantaléon de Noé arrived in the German city of Coblence, at the court of the princes (the two brothers of Louis XVI, the Count of Provence and the Count of Artois). His son Louis-Pantaléon-Jude-Amédée de Noé joined him there to serve in the Army of the Princes. In 1793, father and son moved to England. In July 1795, Count de Noé made written arrangements before joining the army of the Count of Artois. He participated in the failed landing attempt on the island of Yeud in August–September 1795 and then returned to England.

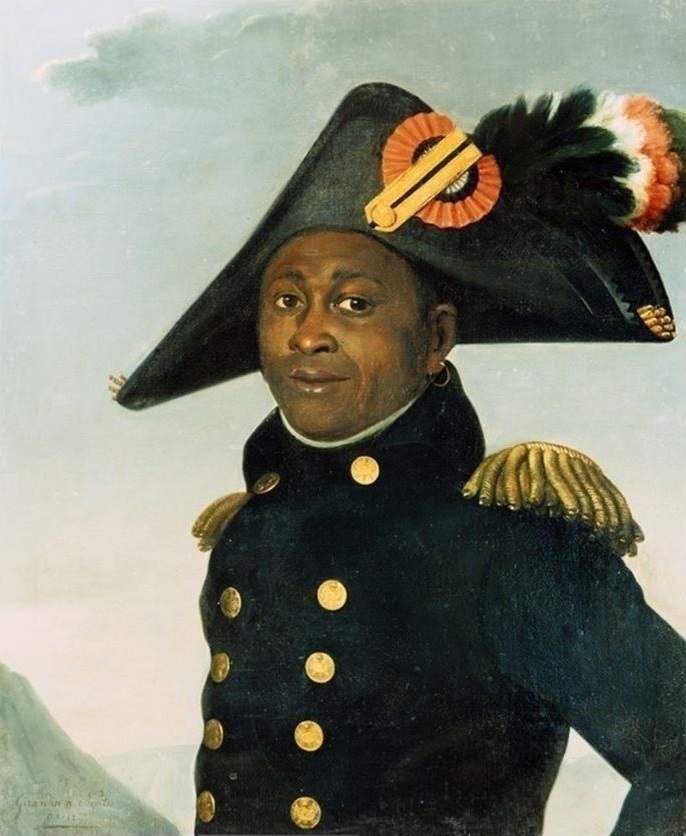
Toussaint Louverture

On April 6, 1799, Count de Noé sent a letter to the new strongman of Saint-Domingue, Toussaint Louverture, a former slave from the Bréda plantation. Indeed, Louis-Pantaléon had learned that Toussaint Louverture had taken over the old Noé plantation at Les Manquets. The former slave-owner begged the former slave to send him money, citing their good relations and his difficult financial situation:

"What I have just learned, my dear Toussaint, about the services you have rendered to Mr. Bayon, our former attorney, confirms me in the opinion I had already formed of you, based on the recent public acts of your conduct. This also proves to me that you have not forgotten those to whom you were attached for so many years. All these reasons lead me to think with confidence that you will find the same pleasure in being useful to me once I have made known to you the unfortunate situation in which the misfortunes of the Revolution have reduced me, stripping me of a great fortune and reducing me to poverty, lacking everything at an advanced age. Without this dreadful Revolution, my intention was to go with my children and peacefully end my days on my plantations, where my greatest joy would have been to make happy all those who depended on me, as you know well that myself and my relatives, we did during our stay in the colony. But alas! I fear that this plan may never be executed; however, it could still happen; if, as I like to persuade myself, you want to use your power and means to restore my plantations and those of my relatives, whom you have known, and to send me in this country where I currently reside, the assistance that is necessary for my subsistence, and for the preservation of my life, and that of my children. Goodbye! my dear Toussaint, your response that I will await with impatience equal to my needs will confirm me, I am convinced, in the good opinion I have of you and will prove to me that I was right, as well as my relatives, to have given you our trust, as well as the good Negro Blaise, and a few other good subjects, who had been attached to my father and mother, and to all my family. The Count de Noé. P. S.: The children of my sister, the Countess of Polastron, as well as my cousin, the Count of Butler, former owners of the Bréda plantations, are in the same unfortunate situation as myself, having also been stripped of their fortune. Count Butler, who knew you in Saint-Domingue, does not write to you, knowing that I am doing so. Your response can surely reach me if you send it through the same channel by which I am sending you this letter. As I am fully convinced, my dear Toussaint, that you will come to my aid by sending me funds, either in sugar or in money, and I am enclosing the address of a trading house established in Jamaica, to which you can send the items that you will send me, and which will be sent to me with precision".

This reversal of situation demonstrates how much the Haitian Revolution disrupted the social order. The familiar tone used by Count de Noé and his frankness about his hatred of the Revolution indicate that he knew Toussaint Louverture well. His expressed desire to return to Saint-Domingue is hardly credible but allows him to recall the emancipation of slaves he had carried out during his previous stay. It is probably because he played a role in Toussaint Louverture's emancipation that Count de Noé can entertain some hope of a positive response from him.

It seems that Toussaint Louverture, who resumed the sugar plantation at Les Manquets, responded favorably to Count de Noé's request, whose family then cultivated the memory of the Haitian general. In 1802, Toussaint Louverture was arrested in Saint-Domingue and imprisoned in France, where he died the following year.

=== Return to France (1802-1816) ===
On July 9, 1802, Louis-Pantaléon de Noé decided to return to France, taking advantage of the amnesty for émigrés and officially rallying to the Consulate. Napoleon Bonaparte ordered Charles Leclerc, the general captain of the expedition to Saint-Domingue, "to restore to citizen Pantaléon-Louis Noé the Manquets plantation". However, the family's plantations in Saint-Domingue permanently passed into other hands. After being leased by Toussaint Louverture and other tenants, Haiti's independence on January 1, 1804, dashed the Noé family's hopes.

The family's financial situation was then very difficult. Charlotte de Noé, who stayed in France at L'Isle-de-Noé, was imprisoned as a suspect, being the wife of an émigré, during the Terror. Very indebted, she saw some of her property seized and had to sell others, such as the Bonnefont castle in the barony of Antin. In 1802, she was even forced to sell part of the L'Isle-Noé castle. Despite the pension of 3,000 francs received by Count de Noé as a brigadier general, debts remained unpaid, leading to the sale of the entire castle in 1809.

However, Count de Noé enjoyed an enviable political position. He was a general councilor of the Hautes-Pyrénées department from 1807 to 1813. After an official visit to Tarbes, where Louis-Pantaléon de Noé commanded the guard of honor, Napoleon decided to double his pension, which thus increased to 6,000 francs. Louis-Pantaléon was also a member of the Legion of Honor. He lived between L'Isle-de-Noé, Tarbes, and Paris, where he bought an apartment at 12 rue du Bac. He appeared to be aligned with the Empire. Two of his sons served in the Napoleonic army and were killed in action: Édouard, a captain, died during the Spanish War of Independence in 1813, and his brother Léon was killed at the Battle of Leipzig on October 18, 1813.

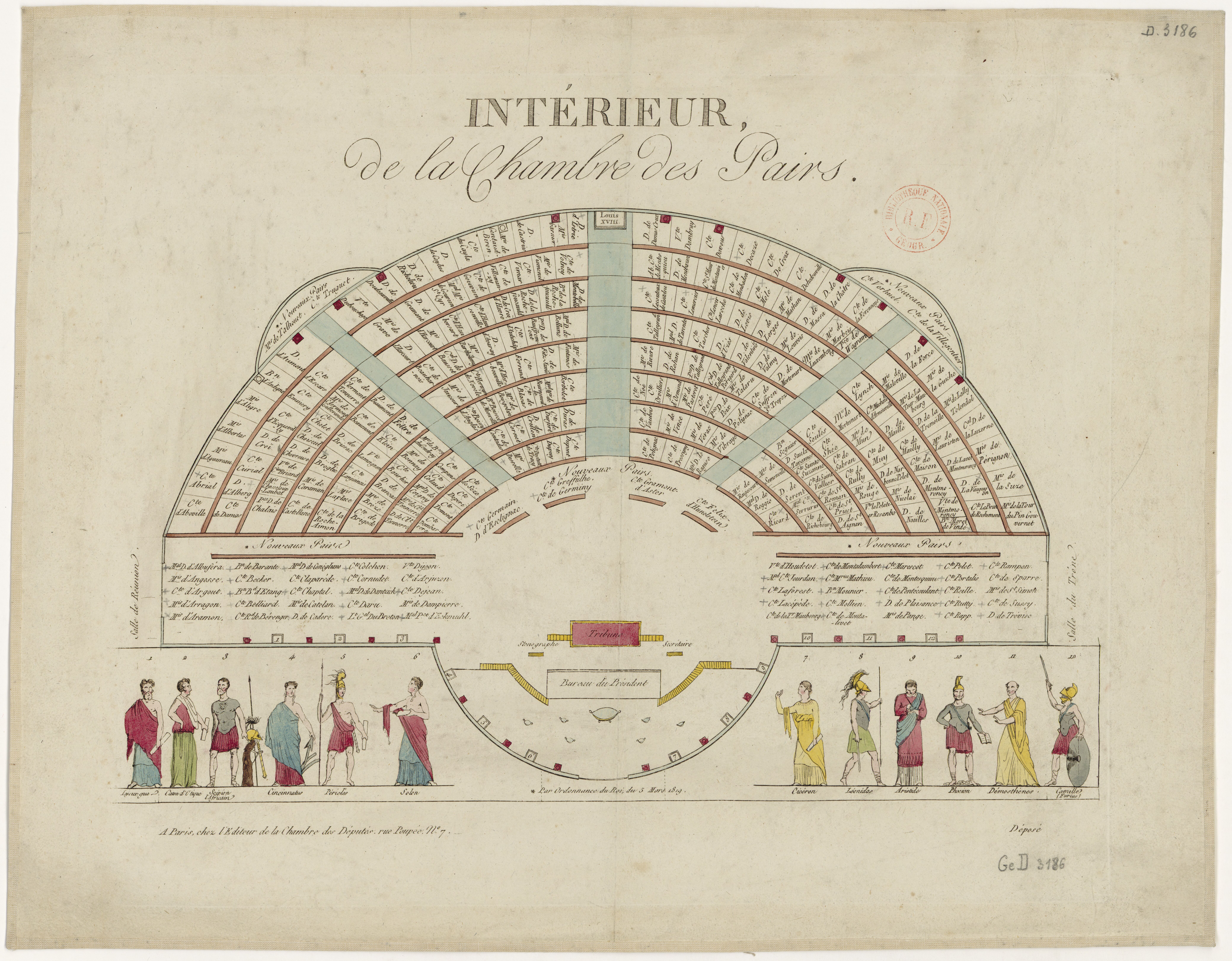
Interior of the Chamber of Peers in 1819. The seat of Louis-Pantaléon-Jude-Amédée de Noé, son of Louis-Pantaléon, is indicated.

On August 13, 1814, during the First Restoration, Louis XVIII appointed Count de Noé lieutenant general. Then, by the ordinance of August 17, 1815, Louis-Pantaléon de Noé was appointed a peer of France at the Second Restoration. When the Chamber of Peers constituted itself as the high court of justice, the old Count de Noé was among the peers of France who, on December 6, 1815, voted for the death of Marshal Ney, accused of joining Napoleon during the Hundred Days.

Louis-Pantaléon de Noé died at his Parisian home on rue du Bac on February 25, 1816. After his death, his son Louis-Pantaléon-Jude succeeded him as a peer of France.

== Decorations ==
- Knight of the Royal and Military Order of Saint Louis in June 1756.
- Knight of the Legion of Honour.

== Heritage and legacy ==
Louis-Pantaléon and Charlotte de Noé had six children, born at the Château de L'Isle-de-Noé and baptized in the village church:

- Jacques Roger Marie Léon, baptized on November 17, 1776, a captain killed in the Battle of Leipzig on October 18, 1813.
- Louis Pantaléon Jude Amédée, baptized on October 28, 1777, died on February 6, 1858, in Paris, Count of Noé, and a peer of France.
- Louise Angélique Charlotte, baptized on February 8, 1779.
- François Louis Édouard, baptized on March 2, 1780, a captain killed in combat during the Spanish War of Independence in 1813.
- Gabrielle Marquette Antoinette Nicolaïne, baptized on November 6, 1782.
- Élisabeth Henriette Marie, baptized on November 5, 1783.

On February 7, 1818, Louis-Pantaléon-Jude-Amédée de Noé, his son, repurchased the family castle of L'Isle-de-Noé, where his mother had continued to live. As part of the compensation for slave owners by the Republic of Haiti, demanded by France in 1825 in exchange for recognizing the independence of the young republic, the four surviving heirs of the Noé family, Louis Pantaléon Jude Amédée and his three sisters, each received 66,784.93 francs for the Manquets plantation and 13,817.21 francs for the two Bréda plantations. The family received a total of 322,408.36 francs in compensation.

=== Legacy ===
The Mirande Museum preserves a gaïac cane, an exotic hardwood, attributed to Toussaint Louverture and offered to the Noé family. The family claimed to have kept it in their castle until the 1980s, stating that Toussaint Louverture carved it during his detention at Fort de Joux. However, this claim seems doubtful given the conditions of his imprisonment. Alternatively, Toussaint Louverture may have sent it while he was the strongman of Haiti, or his family may have transmitted it later.

In the 19th century, the relationship between Louverture and the Count de Noé underwent a romanticized reconstruction in collective memory. Victor Hugo drew inspiration from this in his novel Bug-Jargal, portraying two characters that many details identify as Louis-Pantaléon de Noé and Toussaint Louverture.

== See also ==
- L'Isle-de-Noé
- Toussaint Louverture

== Bibliography ==
- de Cauna, Jacques; Donnadieu, Jean-Louis (2008). "Quand le comte de Noé écrit à Toussaint Louverture…". Outre-Mers (in French). 95 (358). Outre-Mers. Revue d'histoire: 289–301. doi:10.3406/outre.2008.4331. ISSN 1631-0438.
- Donnadieu, Jean-Louis (2009). Un grand seigneur et ses esclaves : Le comte de Noé entre Antilles et Gascogne 1728-1816. Tempus (in French). Presses universitaires du Mirail. ISBN 978-2-8107-0012-7.
- Girard, Philippe; Donnadieu, Jean-Louis (2013). "Toussaint before Louverture: New Archival Findings on the Early Life of Toussaint Louverture". The William and Mary Quarterly (in French). 70 (1): 41. doi:10.5309/willmaryquar.70.1.0041. ISSN 0043-5597. JSTOR 10.5309/willmaryquar.70.1.0041.
