= Arca de Noé =

- Established: 1996
- Type: Supporters' group
- Team: O'Higgins
- Location: Rancagua, Chile
- Colors

The Arca de Noé (Noah's Ark) is an independent supporters group of O'Higgins, a football club in the Primera División de Chile.

== History ==
The barra was founded in July 1996, having today 32 members that travel around Chile following the club in all their matches.

On February 9, 2013; the barra suffered a bus accident in Tomé, where died 16 persons, and 21 results with injuries.

=== Tomé Tragedy ===
After the match between the club and Huachipato, a group of fans traveled in a bus to Tomé, where in the Cuesta Caracol fell into a ravine, causing the death of 16 fans. The event marked the Chilean football, the city of Rancagua and Tomé, so that a date of mourning decreed in the different leagues of the ANFP, and a days in Rancagua and Tomé. The fact affected to all the supporters of the club.
