= Col de Val Louron-Azet =

Mountain pass in the French Pyrenees

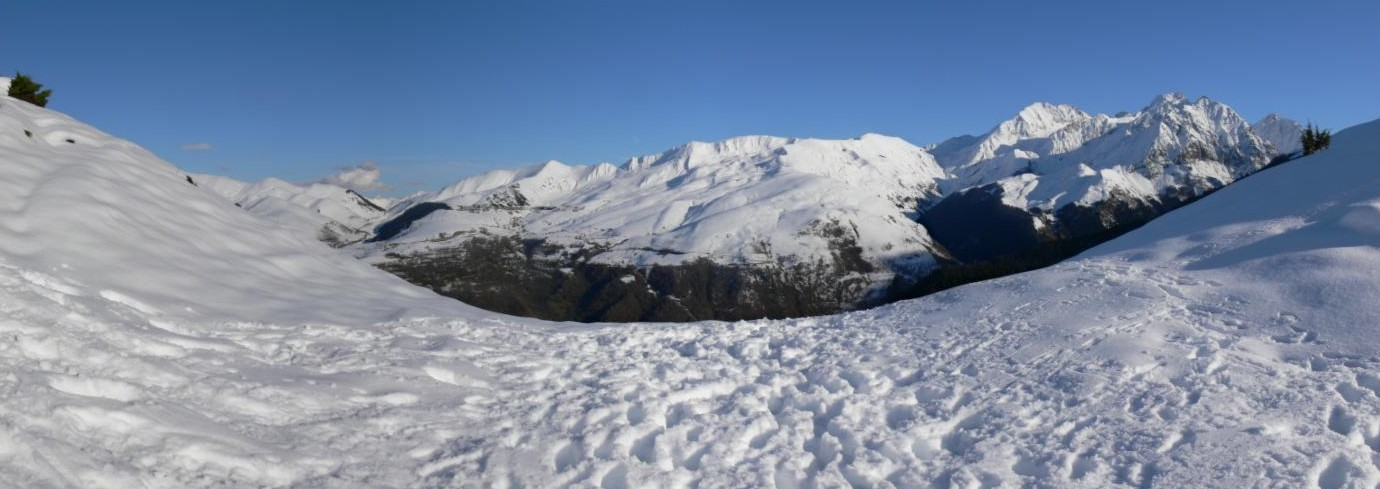
- A panorama of the Col d'Azet in the direction of the Louron Valley.

- Location within France Location within Occitanie Location within Pyrenees
- Elevation: 1,580 metres (5,180 ft)
- Traversed by: D225

Third Approach
- Location: Hautes-Pyrénées, France
- Range: Pyrenees
- Coordinates: 42°47′31″N 0°22′52″E

The Col de Val Louron-Azet (or Col d'Azet) (elevation 1,580 m (5,180 ft)) is a mountain pass in the French Pyrenees in the department of Hautes-Pyrénées, which links Saint-Lary-Soulan and Azet, in the Aure Valley to the west, with Génos and Loudenvielle in the Louron Valley to the east. To the east of the pass is the Val-Louron ski station, and the GR10 footpath is also nearby.

== Details of climb ==
Starting from Génos, the hairpin climb is 7.5 km (4.7 mi) long. Over this distance, the climb is 620 m (2,030 ft) at an average gradient of 8.3%, with the steepest section being at 13.6%.

Starting from Bazus-Aure, near to Saint-Lary-Soulan, the climb is 12 km (7.5 mi) long. Over this distance, the climb is 807 m (2,648 ft) at an average gradient of 6.7%, with the steepest sections being at 14.0%.

Starting from Bourisp, the climb is 10.7 km (6.6 mi) long. Over this distance, the climb is 780 m (2,560 ft) at an average gradient of 7.3%, with the steepest sections being at 13.5%.

== Appearances in Tour de France ==
The Col de Val Louron-Azet was first used in the Tour de France in 1997, since when it has featured ten times, most recently in 2022.

Year	Stage	Category	Start	Finish	Leader at the summit
2022	17	1	Saint-Gaudens	Peyragudes	Tadej Pogačar (SLO)
2021	17	1	Muret	Col du Portet	Anthony Perez (FRA)
2018	17	1	Bagnères-de-Luchon	Col du Portet	Julian Alaphilippe (FRA)
2016	8	1	Pau	Bagnères-de-Luchon	Wout Poels (NED)
2014	17	1	Saint-Gaudens	Saint-Lary-Soulan Pla d'Adet	Joaquim Rodríguez (ESP)
2013	9	1	Saint-Girons	Bagnères-de-Bigorre	Simon Clarke (AUS)
2005	15	1	Lézat-sur-Lèze	Saint-Lary-Soulan Pla d'Adet	Laurent Brochard (FRA)
2001	13	1	Foix	Saint-Lary-Soulan Pla d'Adet	Laurent Jalabert (FRA)
1999	15	1	Saint-Gaudens	Piau-Engaly	Fernando Escartín (ESP)
1997	9	1	Pau	Loudenvielle-Vallée du Louron	Marco Pantani (ITA)
