= Val-Louron =

French mountain ski resort

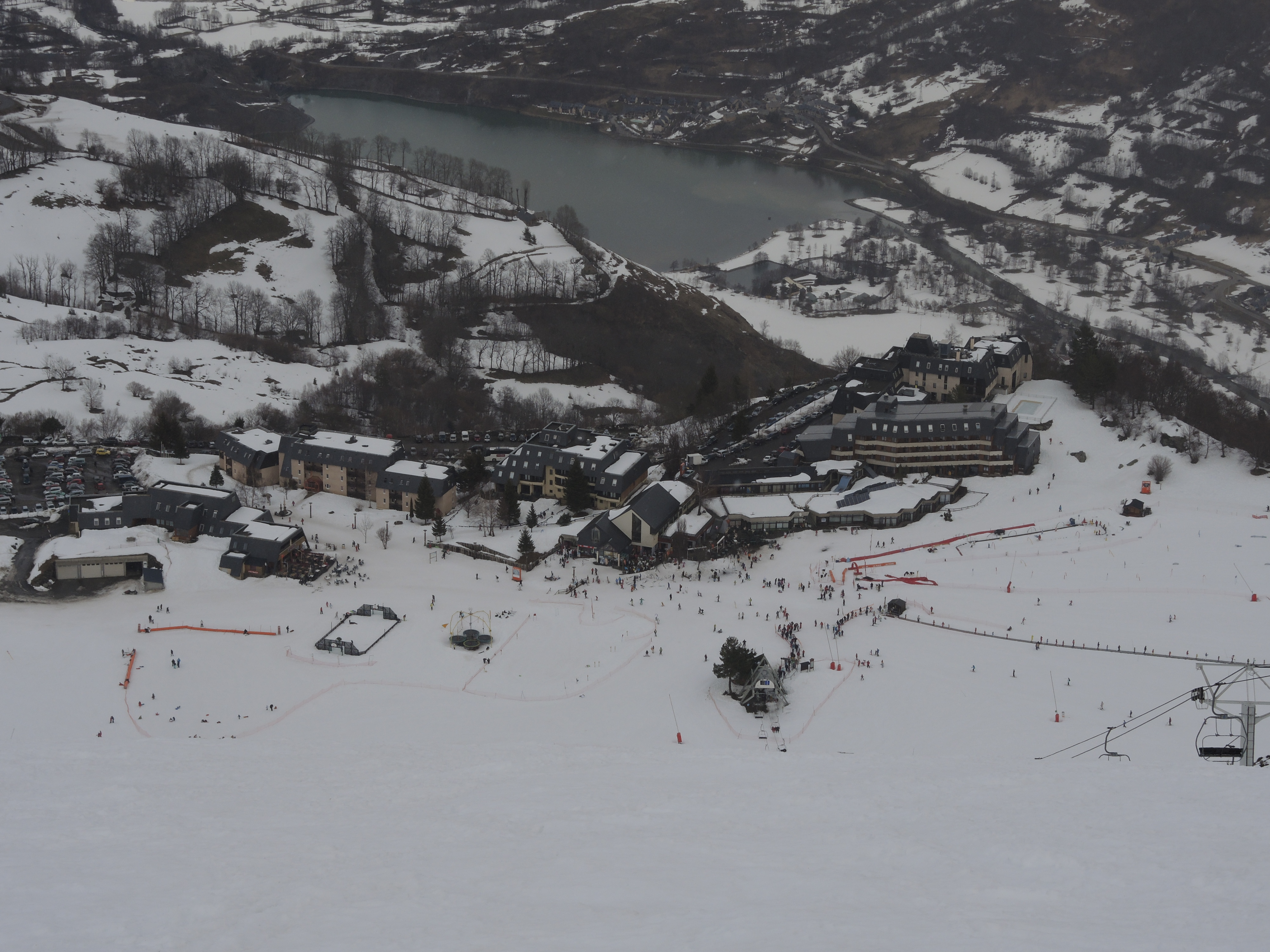
- A general view of Val-Louron

- Location within France Location within Occitanie Location within Pyrenees
- Nearest city: Tarbes
- Coordinates: 42.7903°N 0.3897°E
- Top elevation: 2,150 m (7,050 ft)
- Base elevation: 1,450 m (4,760 ft)
- Trails: 19
- Snowmaking: 46 snow guns
- Website: www.val-louron-ski.com

Val-Louron (French pronunciation: [val luʁɔ̃]) is a ski resort in the French Pyrenees, in the department of Hautes-Pyrénées, and the Occitania region.

== Toponymy ==
The ski station is located in the Louron Valley, which is where the name of Val-Louron originated.

== Geography ==
Val-Louron is specifically located in the Pays d'Aure in the Louron Valley, southeast of Bagnères-de-Bigorre and Tarbes, in Bigorre. The nearest commune, by a direct route, is Loudenvielle to the east. By road, the nearest communes are Azet to the north-west, and Génos to the north-east, each situated at either end of the Col de Val Louron-Azet. Its altitude is between 1,450 metres (4,760 ft) at the bottom of the station, and 2,100 metres (6,900 ft) at the top.

== Infrastructure ==
=== Ski area ===
- 22 kilometres (14 mi) of alpine ski slopes
- 19 tracks
- 46 snow guns
- 12 lifts
- 5 circuits for snowshoes
- Sled dogs

== Tour de France ==
Val-Louron was the finish for Stage 13 of the 1991 Tour de France, and proved to be decisive. The riders arrived separately and Claudio Chiappucci, along with the eventual winner Miguel Indurain, then occupied two of the first three places in the race. The stage departed from the Spanish town of Jaca and the Col du Tourmalet also featured in the route for the day.

Stage 15 of the 2005 Tour de France also went through Val-Louron, although it took the descent by Val-Louron-Azet. The first rider over the summit was Laurent Brochard.

== Related articles ==
- Hautes-Pyrénées
- Bigorre
