= 2027 Tour de France, Stage 12 to Stage 21 =

Cycling results

The 2027 Tour de France was the 113th edition of the Tour de France.

== Classification standings ==
Legend
Denotes the leader of the general classification	Denotes the leader of the mountains classification
Denotes the leader of the points classification	Denotes the leader of the young rider classification
Denotes the leader of the team classification	Denotes the winner of the combativity award

== Stage 12 ==
15 July 2027 – Chambéry to Valence, 162 km (101 mi)

== Stage 13 ==
16 July 2027 – Aubenas to Montpellier, 164 km (102 mi)

== Stage 14 ==
17 July 2027 – Montpellier to Mende, 199 km (124 mi)

== Stage 15 ==
18 July 2027 – Rodez to Albi, 169 km (105 mi)

== Rest day 3 ==
19 July 2027 – Toulouse

== Stage 16 ==
20 July 2027 – Toulouse to Toulouse, 33 km (21 mi) (ITT)

== Stage 17 ==
21 July 2027 – Muret to Pau, 186 km (116 mi)

== Stage 18 ==
22 July 2027 – Pau to Saint-Lary-Soulan Col du Portet, 174 km (108 mi)

== Stage 19 ==
23 July 2027 – Hasparren to Laruns, 160 km (99 mi)

== Stage 20 ==
24 July 2027 – Maubourguet to Libourne, 198 km (123 mi)

== Stage 21 ==
25 July 2027 – Saint-Quentin-en-Yvelines to Paris (Champs-Élysées), 116 km (72 mi)
