= 2027 Tour de France =

2027 UCI World Tour, race 26 of 36

Race details
- Dates: 2–25 July 2027
- Stages: 21
- Distance: 3,479 km (2,162 mi)

The 2027 Tour de France will be the upcoming 114th edition of the Tour de France. The race will begin with a stage in Edinburgh, Scotland on 2 July and will finish with the final stage at the Champs-Élysées, Paris, on 25 July.

== Route and stages ==
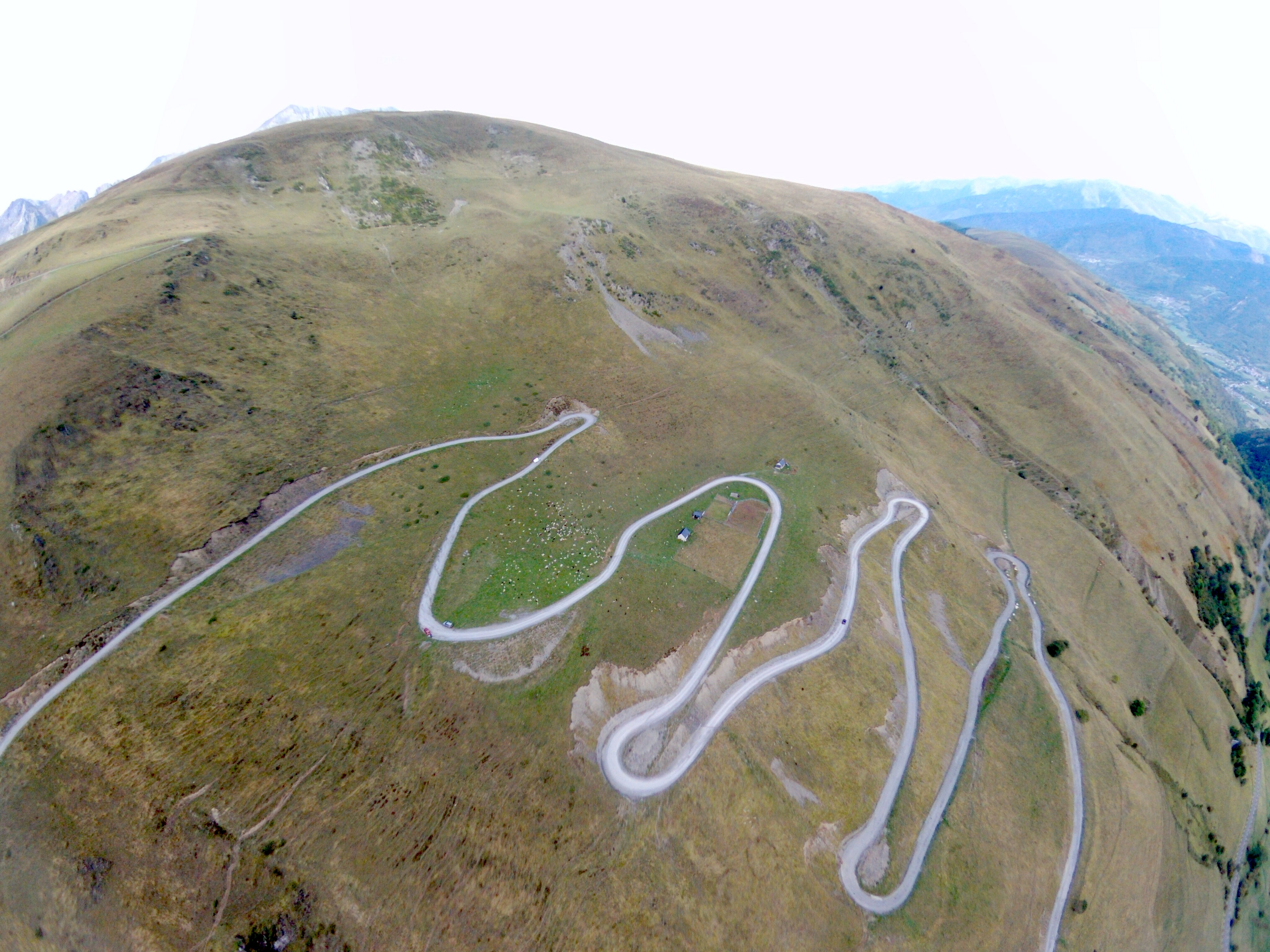
Stage 18 will have a summit finish at Col de Portet, at an elevation of 2,215 m (7,267 ft)

In March 2025, it was announced that the 2027 editions of the Tour de France and Tour de France Femmes would have a Grand Départ in the United Kingdom, marking the first time that both the men's and women's races have started in the same nation outside France. In January 2026, more details were announced: the race would start in Edinburgh and the first three stages would visit Scotland, Wales and England.

Prior to the route announcement, there were rumours that the race would visit the ski resort of Les Saisies for the first time.

In October 2026, the full route was announced by race director Christian Prudhomme. The route has twenty-one stages over twenty-four days, covering a total of 3,479 km (2,162 mi) with 53,450 metres (175,360 ft) of elevation gain. There will be three summit finishes, the fewest since 2021. Only two mountain climbs (both on stage 18) will be higher than 1,750 m (5,740 ft). The race will feature 71 km (44 mi) of individual time trial, the longest distance since 2012.

Media considered that the route would benefit time trial specialists such as Remco Evenepoel and French hope Paul Seixas, while negatively impacting climbers such as Jonas Vingegaard. Cycling News considered that stage 18 in the Pyrenees would be the queen stage, owing to its 5,400 m (17,700 ft) of elevation gain. Other pivotal stages were considered to be stage 10 (a "dress rehearsal" for the 2027 UCI Road World Championships in Sallanches), stage 11 to Les Saisies and the two individual time-trials.

Cycling Weekly considered that the route was designed to reduce the domination of five-time winner Tadej Pogačar, however this was denied by Prudhomme who stated "it's not anti-[Pogačar], you put pavé or time trials or climbs in front of him, he can take time and then he gains even more time on his rivals on the descents. There is a will to rebalance things, not for a single rider in particular, just like a few years ago we tried to make the route have a more punchy kind of course to try to boost the chances of a spectacular race".

Stage characteristics
Stage	Date	Course	Distance	Type	Winner
1	2 July	Edinburgh (Scotland) to Carlisle (England)	185 km (115 mi)	Flat stage	
2	3 July	Keswick (England) to Liverpool (England)	223 km (139 mi)	Hilly stage	
3	4 July	Welshpool (Wales) to Cardiff (Wales)	223 km (139 mi)	Hilly stage	
	5 July	Cherbourg-en-Cotentin	Rest day		
4	6 July	Cherbourg-en-Cotentin to Cherbourg-en-Cotentin	171 km (106 mi)	Hilly stage	
5	7 July	Pontorson to Plumelec	178 km (111 mi)	Hilly stage	
6	8 July	Vannes to Angers	193 km (120 mi)	Hilly stage	
7	9 July	Blois to Chambord	38 km (24 mi)	Individual time trial	
8	10 July	Bourges to Le Creusot	224 km (139 mi)	Hilly stage	
9	11 July	Villars-les-Dombes (Parc des Oiseaux) to Grand Colombier	162 km (101 mi)	Mountain stage	
	12 July	Haute-Savoie	Rest day		
10	13 July	Annecy to Sallanches	171 km (106 mi)	Mountain stage	
11	14 July	Cluses to Les Saisies	150 km (93 mi)	Mountain stage	
12	15 July	Chambéry to Valence	162 km (101 mi)	Flat stage	
13	16 July	Aubenas to Montpellier	164 km (102 mi)	Flat stage	
14	17 July	Montpellier to Mende	199 km (124 mi)	Mountain stage	
15	18 July	Rodez to Albi	169 km (105 mi)	Hilly stage	
	19 July	Haute-Savoie	Rest day		
16	20 July	Toulouse	33 km (21 mi)	Individual time trial	
17	21 July	Muret to Pau	186 km (116 mi)	Flat stage	
18	22 July	Pau to Saint-Lary-Soulan (Col de Portet)	174 km (108 mi)	Mountain stage	
19	23 July	Hasparren to Laruns	160 km (99 mi)	Mountain stage	
20	24 July	Maubourguet to Libourne	198 km (123 mi)	Flat stage	
21	25 July	Saint-Quentin-en-Yvelines to Paris (Champs-Élysées)	116 km (72 mi)	Flat stage	
Total			3,479 km (2,162 mi)		
