= Château de Génos =

Ruined castle in Génos in the Hautes-Pyrénées département of France

Coordinates: 42.81°N 0.405°E

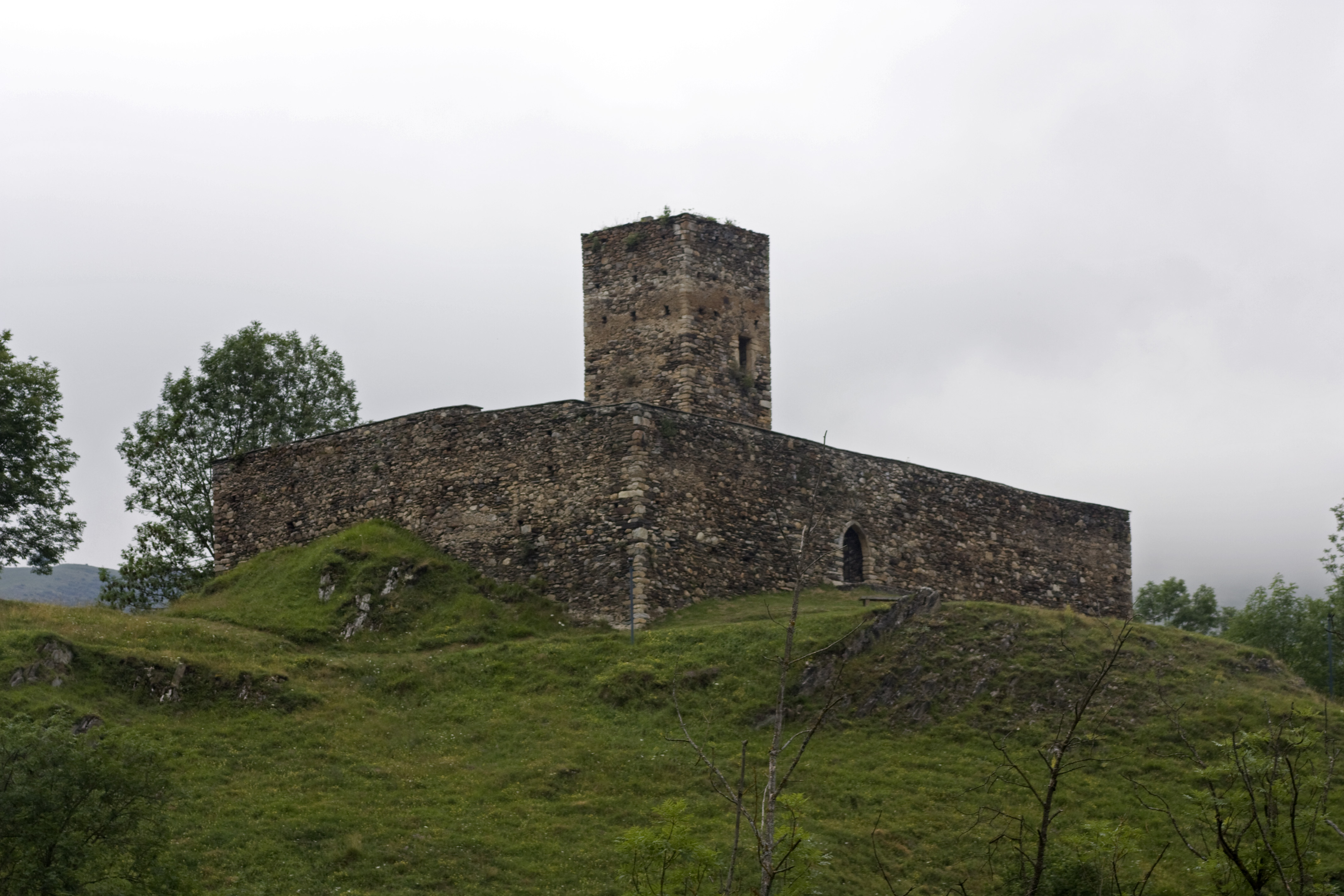
Château de Génos

The Château des Comtes de Génos is a ruined castle in the commune of Génos in the Hautes-Pyrénées département of France.

== History ==
The castle was built in the third quarter of the 13th century. Its existence is known from 1256 from a document in the cartulary of Comminges. In 1532, it was specified that the inhabitants of the valley should maintain and defend the castle in time of war.

In 1899, following the intervention of J.de Lahondès, president of the Société archéologique du Midi de la France, the mayor of Génos passed a decree to prohibit the inhabitants dismantling the walls.

The castle is the property of the commune.

== In popular culture ==
The writer Paul Féval set part of the action of his novel Le Bossu (1857) in and around the castle. His description of the local scenery is accurate, but his description of the castle itself is imaginary. Féval wrote of a castle "au grand aspect" with "le sommet déchiqueté de ses vielles tours, un authentique village fortifié", and with moats. In fact, the description owes more to the historical novel traditions of Sir Walter Scott than to reality.

== See also ==
- List of castles in France
