= Henri Caillavet =

French politician (1914–2013)

- Born: 13 February 1914; Agen, France
- Died: 27 February 2013 (aged 99); Bourisp, France
- Occupation: Politician

Henri Caillavet (French: [ɑ̃ʁi kajavɛ]; 2 June 1914 – 27 February 2013) was a French political figure most prominent during the post-war years 1946–1958, when, during the Fourth Republic, he was a member of the National Assembly and as a Senator from 1967–1985.

A native of Agen, Lot-et-Garonne, and trained as a lawyer, Caillavet was renowned in France as a veteran guardian of civil liberties. He proposed bills concerning gay rights, abortion, transgender issues, divorce by mutual consent, euthanasia and organ transplants.

In January 1953, the ministerial portfolio of France d'Outre-mer was conferred upon him in the government of René Mayer, then that of the Navy in the government of Pierre Mendès France in 1954. In 1958, he opposed General Charles de Gaulle in voting against his investiture and against the new Constitution.

He then left Lot-et-Garonne and was elected mayor of Bourisp in the department of Hautes-Pyrénées from 1959 to 1983. He competed in senatorial elections in Lot-et-Garonne and was elected in June 1967. Senator from 1967 to 1983, he combined this office with that of MEP from 1979 to 1984. He lost his mandate in 1983 against Senator Jean François-Poncet. But he helped to launch a number of initiatives, such as the creation of the CNIL and the think tank Voltaire Network; in this position, he chaired the committee for transparency and plurality of the press (June 1985).

Several times president of the Association for the Right to Die with Dignity (ADMD), he resigned on 23 June 2007.

Caillevet died in Bourisp on 27 February 2013, at the age of 99.
