= 2027 UCI World Tour =

Road cycling competitions

- Seventeenth edition of the UCI WorldTour

Details
- Dates: 19 January – 17 October
- Location: Australia; Canada; China; Europe; United Arab Emirates
- Races: 36

The 2027 UCI World Tour is a series of races that includes thirty-six events throughout the 2027 cycling season. The tour will start with the Tour Down Under on 19 January and will conclude with the Tour of Guangxi on 17 October.

== Events ==
The race calendar for the 2027 season was announced in June 2026, with thirty-six races scheduled. The most significant change compared to the 2026 calendar was the rescheduling of the Vuelta a España, which moved from its traditional late-August start to 4 September. This change was made to accommodate the UCI Road World Championships, part of the second edition of the UCI "Super World Championships", held in Haute-Savoie, France, from 24 August to 5 September 2027.

Races in the 2027 UCI World Tour
Race	Date	Winner	Second	Third
(Australia) Tour Down Under	19–24 January			
(Australia) Cadel Evans Great Ocean Road Race	31 January			
(United Arab Emirates) UAE Tour	15–21 February			
(Belgium) Omloop Het Nieuwsblad	27 February			
(Italy) Strade Bianche	6 March			
(France) Paris–Nice	7–14 March			
(Italy) Tirreno–Adriatico	8–14 March			
(Italy) Milan–San Remo	20 March			
(Spain) Volta a Catalunya	22–28 March			
(Belgium) Classic Brugge–De Panne	24 March			
(Belgium) E3 Saxo Classic	26 March			
(Belgium) Gent-Wevelgem	28 March			
(Belgium) Dwars door Vlaanderen	31 March			
(Belgium) Tour of Flanders	4 April			
(Spain) Tour of the Basque Country	5–10 April			
(France) Paris–Roubaix	11 April			
(Netherlands) Amstel Gold Race	18 April			
(Belgium) La Flèche Wallonne	21 April			
(Belgium) Liège–Bastogne–Liège	25 April			
(Switzerland) Tour de Romandie	27 April – 2 May			
(Germany) Eschborn–Frankfurt	1 May			
(Italy) Giro d'Italia	8–30 May			
(France) Tour Auvergne-Rhône-Alpes	6–13 June			
(Denmark) Copenhagen Sprint	13 June			
(Switzerland) Tour de Suisse	16–20 June			
Tour de France	2–25 July			
(Spain) Clásica de San Sebastián	31 July			
(Poland) Tour de Pologne	2–8 August			
(Germany) Hamburg Cyclassics	15 August			
(Belgium) / (Netherlands) Renewi Tour	18–22 August			
(France) Bretagne Classic	22 August			
(Spain) Vuelta a España	4–24 September			
(Canada) Grand Prix Cycliste de Québec	10 September			
(Canada) Grand Prix Cycliste de Montréal	12 September			
(Italy) Il Lombardia	9 October			
(China) Tour of Guangxi	12–17 October			
