= Col de Portet =

French Pyrenees mountain pass

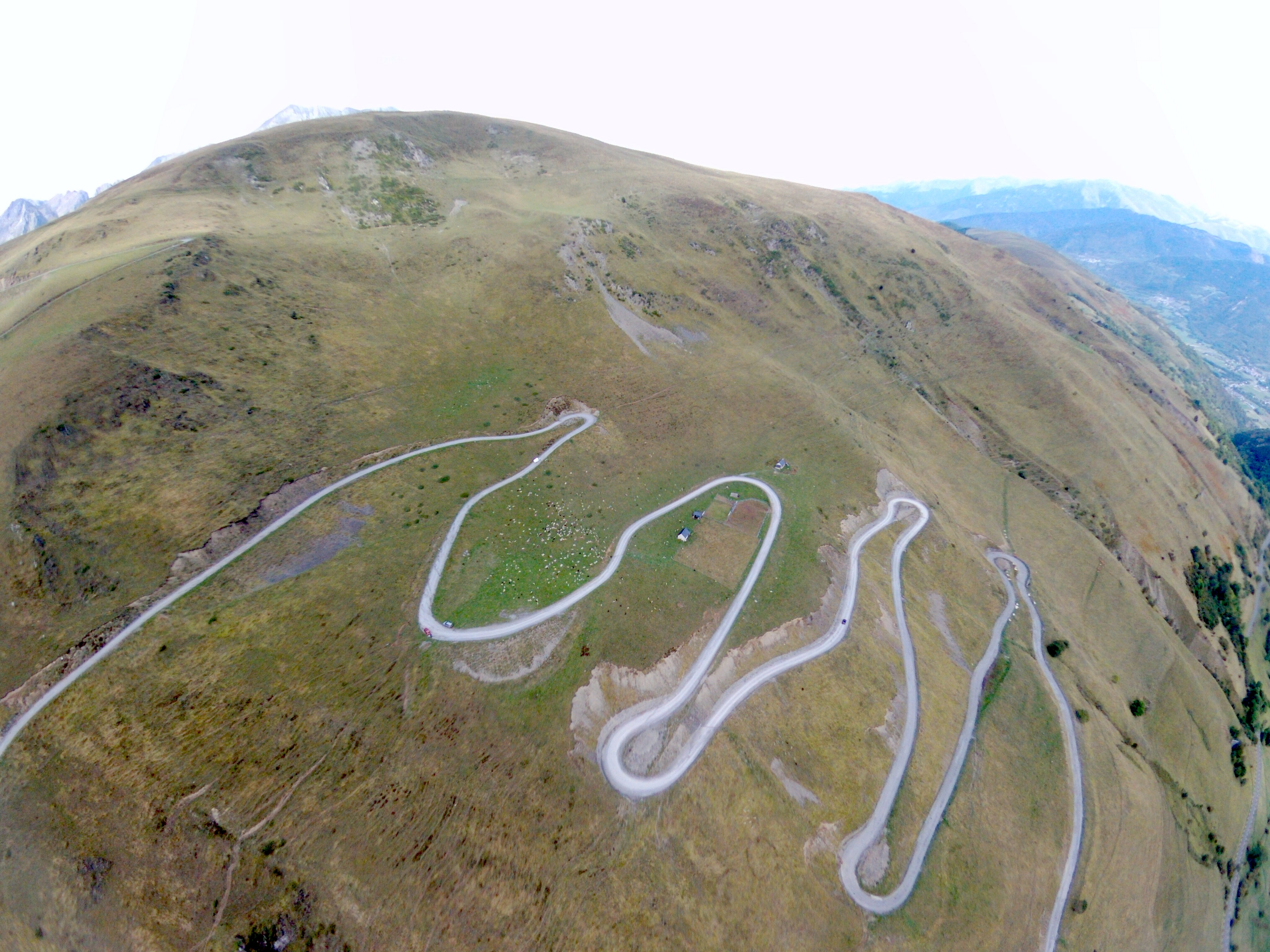
- A view of the hairpins of the Col de Portet

- Location within Pyrenees
- Elevation: 2,215 m (7,267 ft)
- Traversed by: D123, GR10

Location
- Location: Hautes-Pyrénées, France
- Range: Pyrenees
- Coordinates: 42°49′59″N 0°14′12″E

The Col de Portet is a mountain pass in the French Pyrenees in the department of Hautes-Pyrénées and the Occitanie region. The eastern side of the pass is located in the heart of the skiing area above Saint-Lary-Soulan, and is the winter home of the snowpark of the resort. In summer, it is one of the gateways to the Néouvielle Massif and the Pyrénées National Park for hikers.

== Cycling ==
At 13 FIETS, the Col de Portet is ranked by PJAMM Cycling as the second hardest bike climb in France, behind only the Col de la Loze. The Col averages an 8.6% grade for 16.1 km, ascending nearly 1,400 meters.

== Tour de France ==
An attempt to reach the Col de Portet had already been considered by the city of Saint-Lary-Soulan for the 1982 Tour de France, after several arrivals at the Pla d'Adet ski station. Though, the planned finish was cancelled at the end of May 1982, resulting in a finish at Pla d'Adet.

After a wait of 36 years, the climb to the Col de Portet was introduced in the 2018 Tour de France, as the finish for Stage 17. The Col was also featured in the 2021 Tour de France, again as the finish of Stage 17. Yellow jersey-holder Tadej Pogačar won the stage.

Year	Stage	Category	Start	Finish	Leader at the summit
2018	17	HC	Saint-Lary-Soulan	Col de Portet	Nairo Quintana (COL)
2021	17	HC	Muret	Col de Portet	Tadej Pogačar (SLO)
2027	18	HC	Pau	Col de Portet	TBD

== See also ==
- Souvenir Henri Desgrange
