= Azet =

- Commune
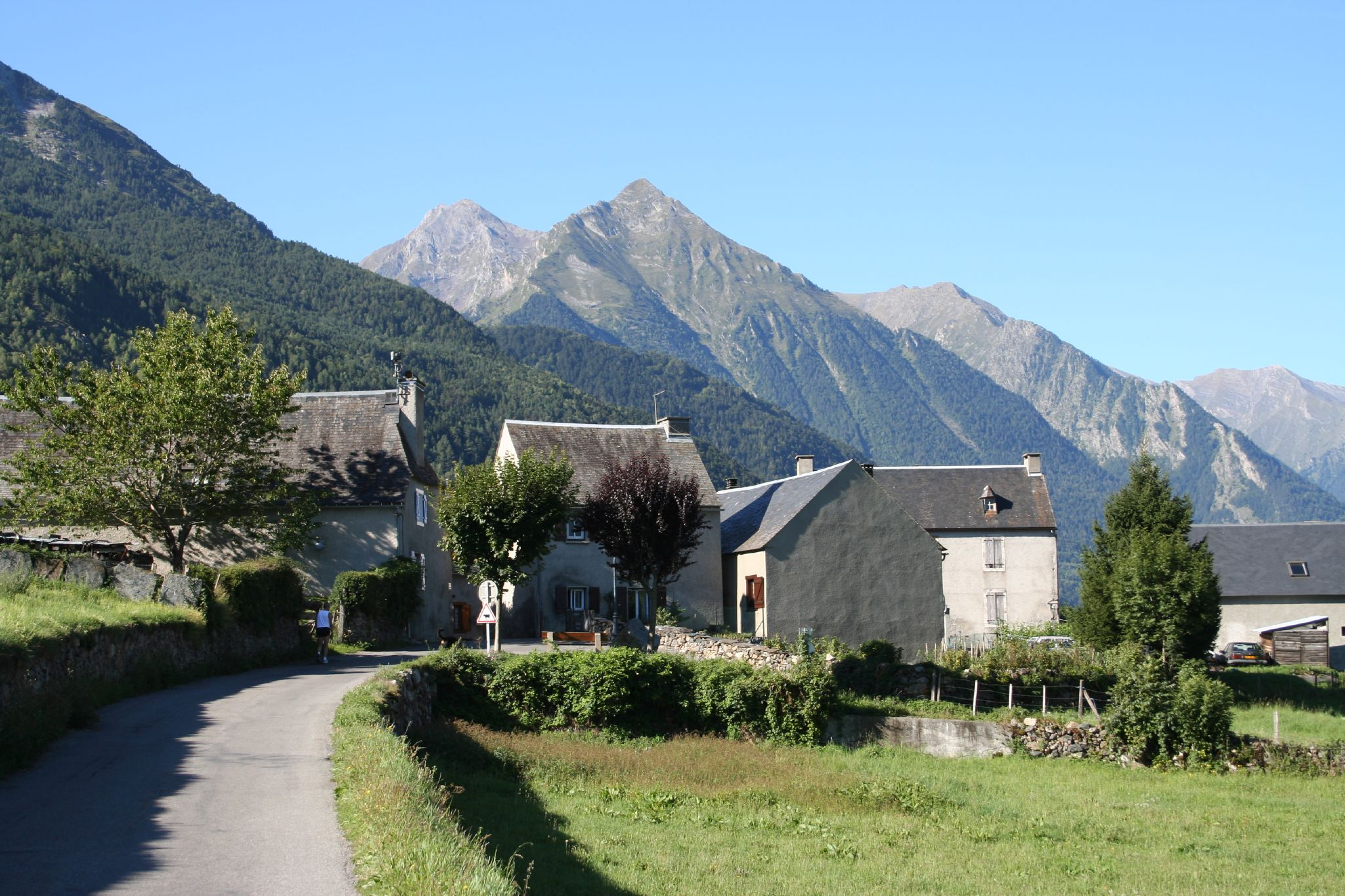
- The village, with Col d'Azet in the background

- Coat of arms
- Location of Azet
- Location within France Location within Occitanie
- Coordinates: 42°48′41″N 0°21′09″E
- Country: France
- Region: Occitania
- Department: Hautes-Pyrénées
- Arrondissement: Bagnères-de-Bigorre
- Canton: Neste, Aure et Louron
- Intercommunality: Aure Louron

Government
  - Mayor (2020–2026): Maryse Puyau
- Area^{1}: 26.63 km^{2} (10.28 sq mi)
- Elevation: 1,172 m (3,845 ft)
- Highest elevation: 3,020 m (9,910 ft)
- Lowest elevation: 1,055 m (3,461 ft)
- Population (2023): 148
  - Density: 5.56/km^{2} (14.4/sq mi)
- Time zone: UTC+01:00 (CET)
  - Summer (DST): UTC+02:00 (CEST)
- INSEE/Postal code: 65058 /65170
- ^{1} French Land Register data, which excludes lakes, ponds, glaciers > 1 km^{2} (0.386 sq mi or 247 acres) and river estuaries.

Azet is a commune in the Hautes-Pyrénées department in the Occitanie region of south-western France.

== Geography ==
Azet is located some 55 km south by south-east of Tarbes and 20 km west of Bagnères-de-Luchon. Access to the commune is by road D225 from Estensan in the west to the village. The public square of the village is 1,172 metres above sea level at the intersection of the Aure and Louron valleys with the Col de Val Louron-Azet to the south-east. The commune is very rugged and inaccessible with extensive forests in the south.

The Ruisseau de Lustau flows north from the Lustou Lake in the south of the commune, gathering many tributaries including the Ruisseau de Sarrouyes which flows from lakes in the south-east of the commune, and becoming the Mousquere before passing the village and continuing north to join the Neste d'Aure north of Vielle-Aure.

=== Climate ===
Azet has a mountain climate with high temperatures in summer.

== Toponymy ==
The probable etymology of the name is Adet, adou, ados, âne, asou, then Azet meaning a place marking the end of the terrain which could only be crossed by donkey or horse.

== History ==
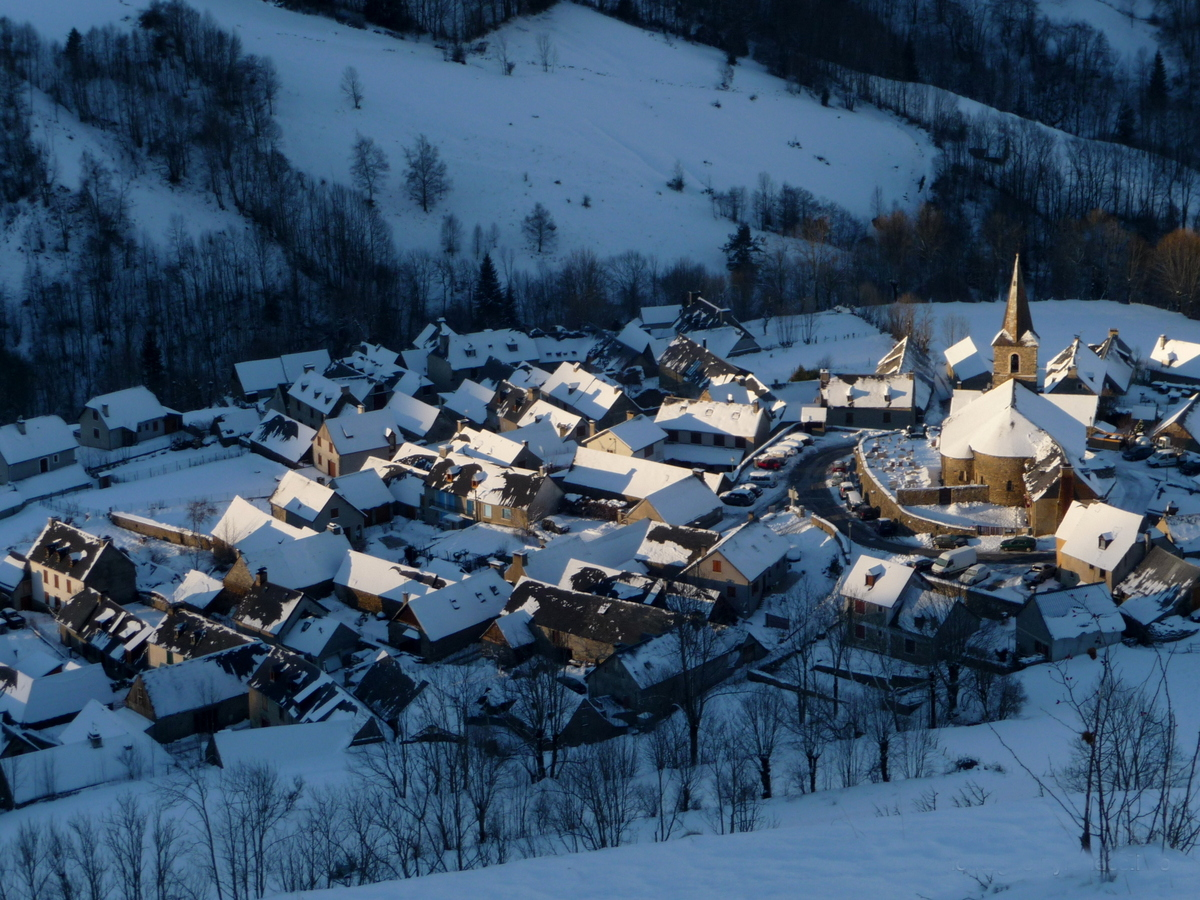
Azet in winter

There is little evidence to trace the origin of the village except the church, which dates from the fourth quarter of the 12th century In 1887 the village had two primary schools. Village resources were mainly pastoralism with livestock farming of sheep, cows, horses, and donkeys as well as crops such as wheat, rye, meslin, barley, buckwheat, beans, peas, potatoes, turnips, flax sprouts, and hay.

From the 1880s the population decreased due to the waves of typhoid fever during 1886-1887 and the rural exodus of young people.

=== Heraldry ===
Arms of Azet	These arms do not respect the rule of tincture and are therefore faulty. Blazon: Azure, a fir proper between two donkeys Sable facing fess point all on a terrace in base Vert, in chief a crosslet Argent.

== Administration ==
List of Successive Mayors

From	To	Name	Party
2001	2020	Jean-Michel Carrot	PS
2020	2026	Maryse Puyau	

== Population ==
The inhabitants of the commune are known as Azetois or Azetoises in French.

Historical population

Year	Pop.	±% p.a.
1793	406	—
1821	491	+0.68%
1846	500	+0.07%
1872	438	−0.51%
1901	401	−0.30%
1926	260	−1.72%
1946	198	−1.35%
1962	185	−0.42%
1968	174	−1.02%

Year	Pop.	±% p.a.
1975	163	−0.93%
1982	146	−1.56%
1990	135	−0.97%
1999	146	+0.87%
2007	161	+1.23%
2012	155	−0.76%
2017	148	−0.92%
2023	148	+0.00%

Source: EHESS and INSE

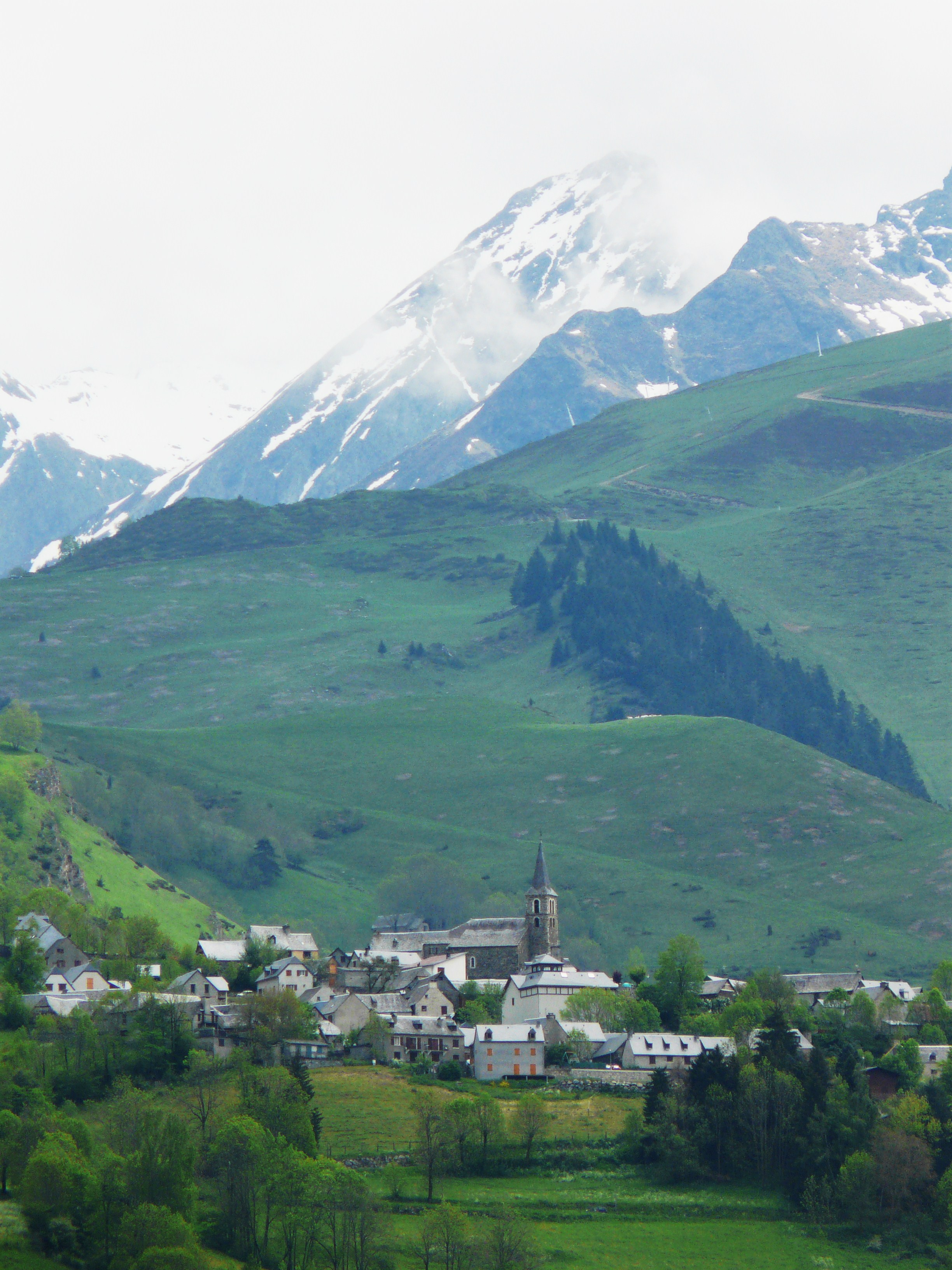
Azet and the mountains

== Culture and heritage ==
=== Civil heritage ===
The commune has a number of sites that are registered as historical monuments:

- Houses and Farms (18th-19th century)
- A Farmhouse (1865)

Other sites of interest

- The Pyrenean House of Pastoralism is an educational and tourist centre on pastoralism in the mountains. The museum traces the history and development of pastoralism in France and worldwide.

=== Religious heritage ===
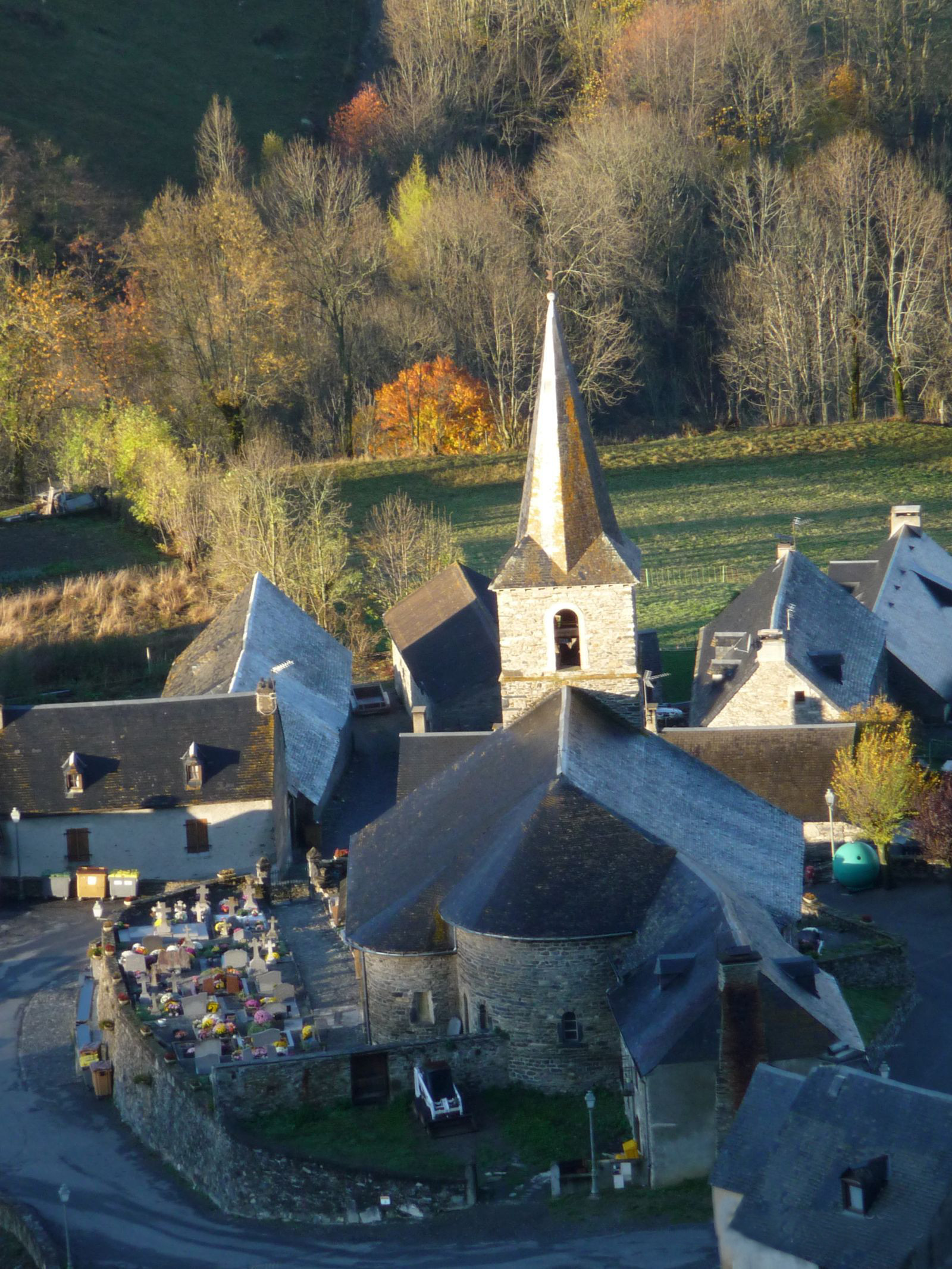
The Church

The Church of Our Lady of the Assumption (12th century) is registered as an historical monument. The Church contains a very large number of items that are registered as historical objects.

== See also ==
- Communes of the Hautes-Pyrénées department
