= Bourisp =

- Commune
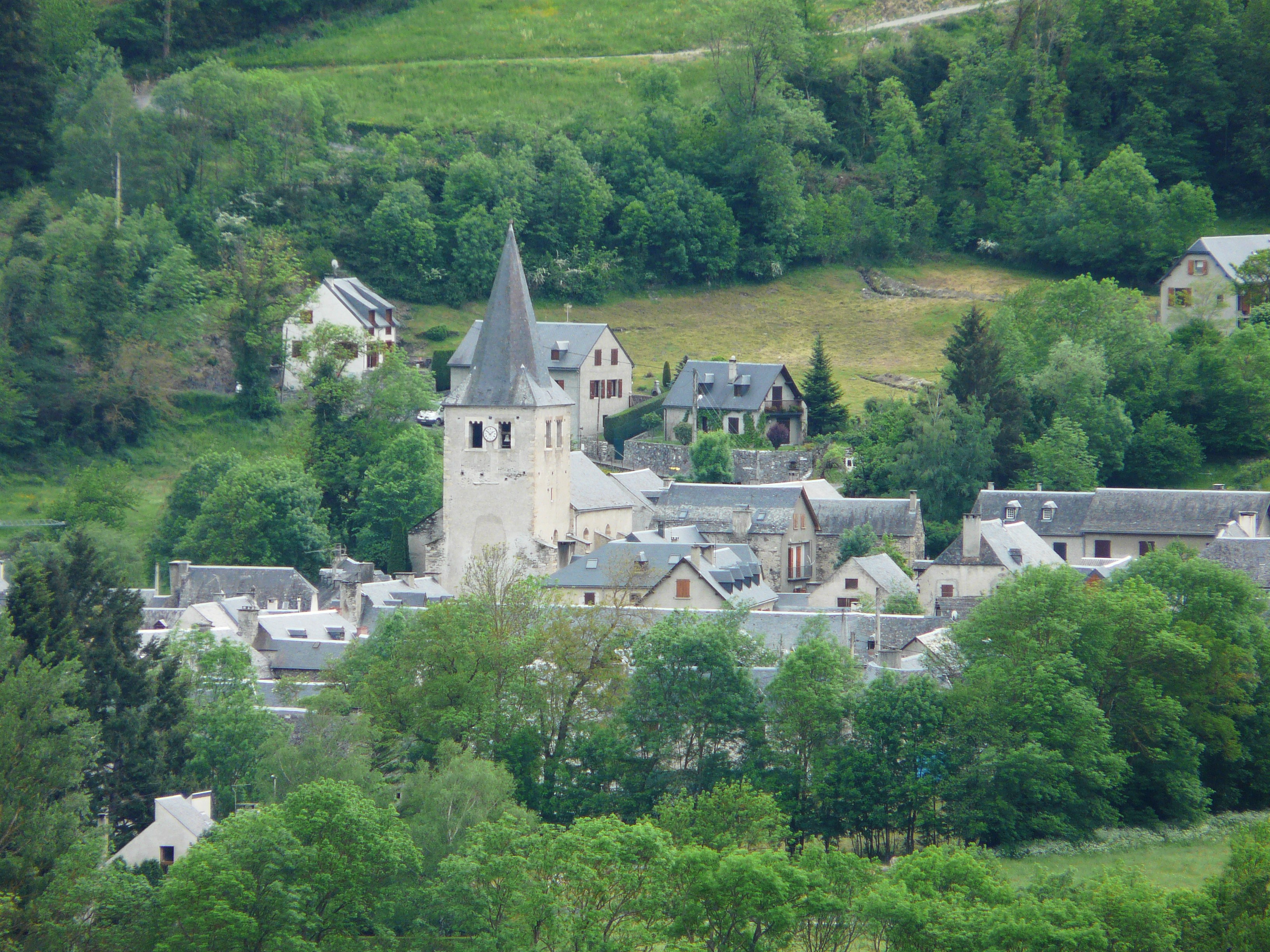
- The village of Bourisp

- Coat of arms
- Location of Bourisp
- Location within France Location within Occitanie
- Coordinates: 42°49′46″N 0°20′21″E
- Country: France
- Region: Occitania
- Department: Hautes-Pyrénées
- Arrondissement: Bagnères-de-Bigorre
- Canton: Neste, Aure et Louron

Government
  - Mayor (2020–2026): Jean Paucis
- Area^{1}: 1.9 km^{2} (0.73 sq mi)
- Elevation: 809 m (2,654 ft)
- Highest elevation: 1,285 m (4,216 ft)
- Lowest elevation: 772 m (2,533 ft)
- Population (2023): 191
  - Density: 100/km^{2} (260/sq mi)
- Time zone: UTC+01:00 (CET)
  - Summer (DST): UTC+02:00 (CEST)
- INSEE/Postal code: 65106 /65170
- ^{1} French Land Register data, which excludes lakes, ponds, glaciers > 1 km^{2} (0.386 sq mi or 247 acres) and river estuaries.

Bourisp is a commune in the Hautes-Pyrénées department in southwestern France.

== Population ==
Historical population
Year	Pop.	±% p.a.
1968	124	—
1975	120	−0.47%
1982	87	−4.49%
1990	103	+2.13%
1999	110	+0.73%
2007	146	+3.60%
2012	155	+1.20%
2017	163	+1.01%
2023	191	+2.68%
Source: INSEE

== See also ==
- Communes of the Hautes-Pyrénées department
