= Génos, Hautes-Pyrénées =

Génos
- Commune
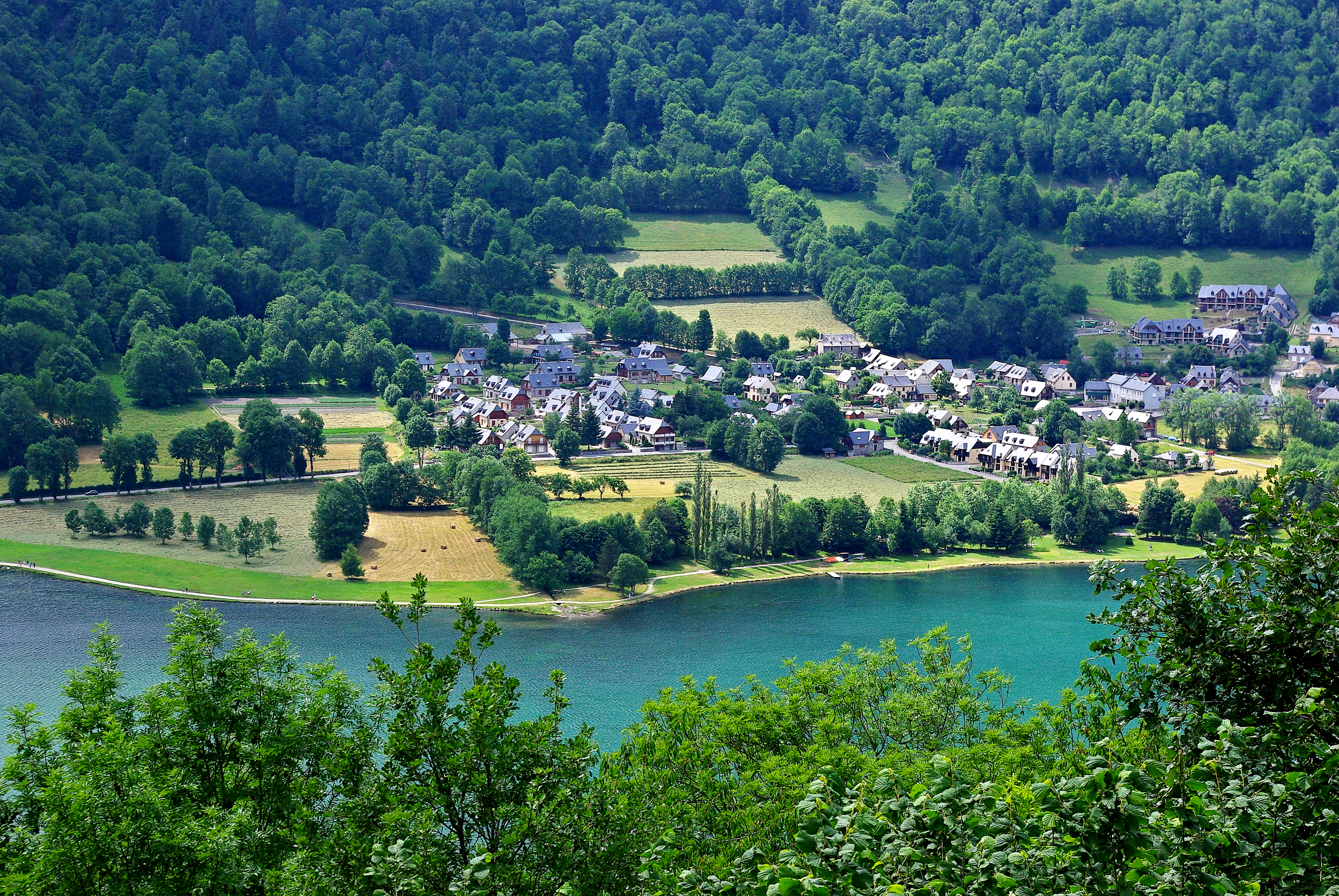
- Génos, on the Génos-Loudenvielle lake.

- Coat of arms
- Location of Génos
- Location within France Location within Occitanie
- Coordinates: 42°48′38″N 0°24′10″E
- Country: France
- Region: Occitania
- Department: Hautes-Pyrénées
- Arrondissement: Bagnères-de-Bigorre
- Canton: Neste, Aure et Louron

Government
  - Mayor (2020–2026): Olivier Cartan
- Area^{1}: 23.63 km^{2} (9.12 sq mi)
- Elevation: 950 m (3,120 ft)
- Highest elevation: 3,022 m (9,915 ft)
- Lowest elevation: 939 m (3,081 ft)
- Population (2023): 127
  - Density: 5.37/km^{2} (13.9/sq mi)
- Time zone: UTC+01:00 (CET)
  - Summer (DST): UTC+02:00 (CEST)
- INSEE/Postal code: 65195 /65510
- ^{1} French Land Register data, which excludes lakes, ponds, glaciers > 1 km^{2} (0.386 sq mi or 247 acres) and river estuaries.

Génos (French pronunciation: [ʒenɔs]; Occitan: Genos) is a commune in the Hautes-Pyrénées department in south-western France.

== Geography ==
=== Climate ===
Génos has an oceanic climate (Köppen climate classification Cfb). The average annual temperature in Génos is 7.9 °C (46.2 °F). The average annual rainfall is 1,520.1 mm (59.85 in) with November as the wettest month. The temperatures are highest on average in August, at around 16.2 °C (61.2 °F), and lowest in January, at around 0.6 °C (33.1 °F). The highest temperature ever recorded in Génos was 34.0 °C (93.2 °F) on 19 July 2016; the coldest temperature ever recorded was −21.0 °C (−5.8 °F) on 16 January 1985.

Climate data for Génos (1991−2020 normals, extremes 1969−2020)
Month	Jan	Feb	Mar	Apr	May	Jun	Jul	Aug	Sep	Oct	Nov	Dec	Year
Record high °C (°F)	16.5 (61.7)	19.0 (66.2)	21.0 (69.8)	25.0 (77.0)	30.0 (86.0)	33.0 (91.4)	34.0 (93.2)	33.5 (92.3)	31.5 (88.7)	28.0 (82.4)	20.0 (68.0)	18.5 (65.3)	34.0 (93.2)
Mean daily maximum °C (°F)	3.6 (38.5)	4.2 (39.6)	8.5 (47.3)	11.1 (52.0)	14.8 (58.6)	18.8 (65.8)	21.3 (70.3)	21.5 (70.7)	17.5 (63.5)	13.0 (55.4)	6.7 (44.1)	4.3 (39.7)	12.1 (53.8)
Daily mean °C (°F)	0.6 (33.1)	0.7 (33.3)	4.0 (39.2)	6.5 (43.7)	10.1 (50.2)	13.7 (56.7)	15.9 (60.6)	16.2 (61.2)	12.7 (54.9)	9.2 (48.6)	3.7 (38.7)	1.5 (34.7)	7.9 (46.2)
Mean daily minimum °C (°F)	−2.5 (27.5)	−2.8 (27.0)	−0.5 (31.1)	1.9 (35.4)	5.3 (41.5)	8.6 (47.5)	10.5 (50.9)	10.9 (51.6)	7.8 (46.0)	5.4 (41.7)	0.8 (33.4)	−1.4 (29.5)	3.7 (38.7)
Record low °C (°F)	−21.0 (−5.8)	−18.0 (−0.4)	−18.0 (−0.4)	−12.0 (10.4)	−5.0 (23.0)	−0.5 (31.1)	1.0 (33.8)	1.5 (34.7)	−1.5 (29.3)	−8.5 (16.7)	−13.0 (8.6)	−16.5 (2.3)	−21.0 (−5.8)
Average precipitation mm (inches)	115.1 (4.53)	89.2 (3.51)	105.2 (4.14)	154.3 (6.07)	156.8 (6.17)	136.4 (5.37)	112.1 (4.41)	109.8 (4.32)	119.6 (4.71)	150.3 (5.92)	162.6 (6.40)	108.7 (4.28)	1,520.1 (59.85)
Average precipitation days (≥ 1.0 mm)	11.1	10.5	11.8	14.0	15.7	13.8	11.5	11.5	11.5	12.6	12.5	11.0	147.4
Source: Météo-France

== See also ==
- Communes of the Hautes-Pyrénées department
