= Saint-Lary-Soulan =

- Commune
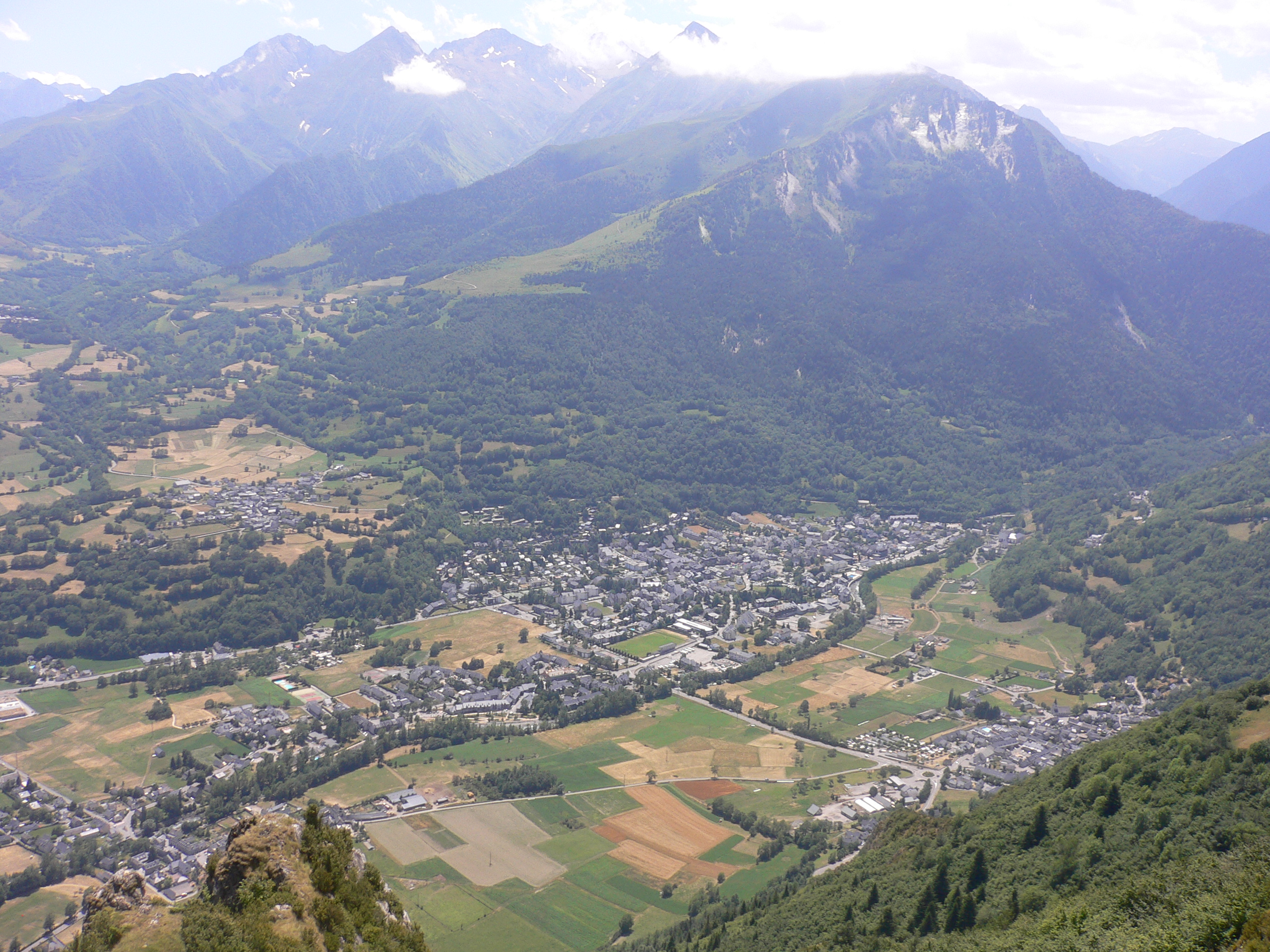
- The village of Saint-Lary-Soulan in the Aure valley.

- Coat of arms
- Location of Saint-Lary-Soulan
- Location within France Location within Occitanie
- Coordinates: 42°49′N 0°19′E
- Country: France
- Region: Occitania
- Department: Hautes-Pyrénées
- Arrondissement: Bagnères-de-Bigorre
- Canton: Neste, Aure et Louron

Government
  - Mayor (2020–2026): André Mir
- Area^{1}: 90.97 km^{2} (35.12 sq mi)
- Highest elevation: 3,087 m (10,128 ft)
- Lowest elevation: 791 m (2,595 ft)
- Population (2023): 837
  - Density: 9.20/km^{2} (23.8/sq mi)
- Time zone: UTC+01:00 (CET)
  - Summer (DST): UTC+02:00 (CEST)
- INSEE/Postal code: 65388 /65170
- ^{1} French Land Register data, which excludes lakes, ponds, glaciers > 1 km^{2} (0.386 sq mi or 247 acres) and river estuaries.

Saint-Lary-Soulan (French pronunciation: [sɛ̃ laʁi sulɑ̃]; Occitan: Sent Lari e Sola, [sen ˈlari e ˈsulo̞]) is a commune of Southwestern France, located in the department of Hautes-Pyrénées, Occitania.

== Geography ==
Saint-Lary is located in Hautes-Pyrénées 80 km south of the département's capital Tarbes, next to the Le Néouvielle Nature Reserve and the Pyrenees National Park and is a 20-minute drive to Spain.

== Sports ==
=== Skiing ===
Saint-Lary-Soulan is one of the largest ski resorts in the French Pyrenees with over 100 km of downhill slopes. There are 53 pistes spread over three linked, and yet distinct sectors. Saint Lary 1700 is known as the Pla d'Adet sector and provides family skiing including snow kindergarten, toboggan run and a 'Kidpark', a snowpark aimed at young skiers aged between 6 and 12 years. Saint Lary 1900 is known as the Espiaube sector and is frequented by more experienced skiers. The showpiece ski run is the Mirabelle which descends 700 metres over its 3.6 km (2.2 mi) length. Saint Lary 2400 has a snowpark which doubles as a skate park in the summer, mogul and slalom stadiums and also provides access to Lake Oule for snow-shoeing.

=== Hiking ===
Saint-Lary-Soulan is also a popular base camp for walkers. The coast to coast GR10 footpath passes through Saint-Lary itself and both the Pyrenees National Park and The Néouvielle Nature Reserve are close by.

=== Cycling ===
The Tour de France frequently runs through Saint-Lary-Soulan, most recently in 2022 and is close to a number of mountain climbs used on the tour including the ski resort Pla d'Adet, the Col d'Aspin, the Col de Peyresourde and the Col du Tourmalet. Stage 17 of the 2014 Tour de France finished at Pla d'Adet, above the commune. Stage 17 of the 2018 Tour de France and Stage 17 of the 2021 Tour de France finished here on the Col du Portet.

== See also ==
- Communes of the Hautes-Pyrénées department
