= 2014 Tour de France, Stage 12 to Stage 21 =

Cycling race stages

The 2014 Tour de France was the 101st edition of the race, one of cycling's Grand Tours. It featured 22 cycling teams. The Tour started in Yorkshire, England on 5 July and finished on the Champs-Élysées in Paris on 27 July.

== Stage 12 ==
17 July 2014 — Bourg-en-Bresse to Saint-Étienne, 185.5 km (115 mi)

This was a hilly stage which travelled from the department of Ain, into Rhône, with a brief incursion into Saône-et-Loire, and finished in Loire. The stage departed from Bourg-en-Bresse, heading west. The race officially started, on the outskirt of Bourg-en-Bresse, at Saint-Denis-lès-Bourg.

The race headed through Neuville-les-Dames and Saint-Didier-sur-Chalaronne, before travelling over the River Rhône to an intermediate sprint at Romanèche-Thorins. The race then turned south and headed into Villié-Morgon before passing through Régnié-Durette, over the Category 4 Col de Brouilly and through Odenas. The route continued south through Saint-Étienne-des-Oullières, Blacé, Saint-Julien and Cogny. Here, the route turned west to begin the climb of the Category 3 Côte du Saule d'Oingt at 551 m (1,808 ft) and then descended south into Oingt, itself. This was followed by Le Bois-d'Oingt and Le Breuil, before heading south-east through Chessy and Châtillon to Lozanne. The route turned, and continued south, through Lentilly and Pollionnay to Vaugneray. Then, the race again headed west to the Category 3 Col des Brosses at 867 m (2,844 ft), and descended south-west into Saint-Symphorien-sur-Coise. The route turned south, once again, headed over the Category 4 Côte de Grammond at 778 m (2,552 ft), and descended through Fontanès and Sorbiers into La Talaudière, before 8.5 km (5 mi) of relatively flat finish into Saint-Étienne.

Stage 12 result

Rank	Rider	Team	Time
1	Alexander Kristoff (NOR)	Team Katusha	4h 32' 11"
2	Peter Sagan (SVK)	Cannondale	+ 0"
3	Arnaud Démare (FRA)	FDJ.fr	+ 0"
4	Michael Albasini (SUI)	Orica–GreenEDGE	+ 0"
5	Ramūnas Navardauskas (LTU)	Garmin–Sharp	+ 0"
6	Daniele Bennati (ITA)	Tinkoff–Saxo	+ 0"
7	Bryan Coquard (FRA)	Team Europcar	+ 0"
8	Daniel Oss (ITA)	BMC Racing Team	+ 0"
9	Samuel Dumoulin (FRA)	Ag2r–La Mondiale	+ 0"
10	José Joaquín Rojas (ESP)	Movistar Team	+ 0"

General classification after stage 12

Rank	Rider	Team	Time
1	Vincenzo Nibali (ITA)	Astana	51h 31' 34"
2	Richie Porte (AUS)	Team Sky	+ 2' 23"
3	Alejandro Valverde (ESP)	Movistar Team	+ 2' 47"
4	Romain Bardet (FRA)	Ag2r–La Mondiale	+ 3' 01"
5	Thibaut Pinot (FRA)	FDJ.fr	+ 3' 47"
6	Tejay van Garderen (USA)	BMC Racing Team	+ 3' 56"
7	Jean-Christophe Péraud (FRA)	Ag2r–La Mondiale	+ 3' 57"
8	Bauke Mollema (NED)	Belkin Pro Cycling	+ 4' 08"
9	Jurgen Van den Broeck (BEL)	Lotto–Belisol	+ 4' 18"
10	Jakob Fuglsang (DEN)	Astana	+ 4' 31"

== Stage 13 ==
18 July 2014 — Saint-Étienne to Chamrousse, 197.5 km (123 mi)

This was a high mountain stage which travelled from the department of Loire into Isère. The stage departed from Saint-Étienne, heading east. Racing officially started between Saint-Jean-Bonnefonds and Saint-Chamond.

The race passed through Saint-Paul-en-Jarez, before the early climb of the Category 3 Col de la Croix de Montvieux at 812 m (2,664 ft). The race continued east, passing through Cheyssieu, Cour-et-Buis, La Côte-Saint-André to La Frette. The route turned south-east to Rives, south to Tullins and then east to Voreppe, as the race travelled alongside the River Isère into Saint-Égrève. From Saint-Égrève, the climb began to the summit of the Category 1 Col de Palaquit at 1,154 m (3,786 ft), with a 13.5 km (8 mi) descent south into Grenoble. Grenoble was quickly followed by an intermediate sprint at Saint-Martin-d'Hères before a short climb to Uriage-les-Bains. The first Hors catégorie climb of the tour then began, with a 20.5 km (13 mi) ascent to the finish at the ski resort of Chamrousse, at a height of 1,730 m (5,676 ft).

Before the start there was a minute of silence in memorial for the airplane crash Malaysia Airlines Flight 17. Many Dutch people were killed in this crash. Dutch teams and riders wore black ribbons or black armbands throughout the stage.

Stage 13 result

Rank	Rider	Team	Time
1	Vincenzo Nibali (ITA)	Astana	5h 12' 29"
2	Rafał Majka (POL)	Tinkoff–Saxo	+ 10"
3	Leopold König (CZE)	NetApp–Endura	+ 11"
4	Alejandro Valverde (ESP)	Movistar Team	+ 50"
5	Thibaut Pinot (FRA)	FDJ.fr	+ 53"
6	Tejay van Garderen (USA)	BMC Racing Team	+ 1' 23"
7	Romain Bardet (FRA)	Ag2r–La Mondiale	+ 1' 23"
8	Laurens ten Dam (NED)	Belkin Pro Cycling	+ 1' 36"
9	Jean-Christophe Péraud (FRA)	Ag2r–La Mondiale	+ 2' 09"
10	Fränk Schleck (LUX)	Trek Factory Racing	+ 2' 09"

General classification after stage 13

Rank	Rider	Team	Time
1	Vincenzo Nibali (ITA)	Astana	56h 44' 03"
2	Alejandro Valverde (ESP)	Movistar Team	+ 3' 37"
3	Romain Bardet (FRA)	Ag2r–La Mondiale	+ 4' 24"
4	Thibaut Pinot (FRA)	FDJ.fr	+ 4' 40"
5	Tejay van Garderen (USA)	BMC Racing Team	+ 5' 19"
6	Jean-Christophe Péraud (FRA)	Ag2r–La Mondiale	+ 6' 06"
7	Bauke Mollema (NED)	Belkin Pro Cycling	+ 6' 17"
8	Jurgen Van den Broeck (BEL)	Lotto–Belisol	+ 6' 27"
9	Rui Costa (POR)	Lampre–Merida	+ 8' 35"
10	Leopold König (CZE)	NetApp–Endura	+ 8' 36"

== Stage 14 ==
19 July 2014 — Grenoble to Risoul, 177 km (110 mi)

This was a high mountain stage which travelled from the department of Isère into Hautes-Alpes. The stage departed from Grenoble, heading south-east. Racing officially started after passing through Eybens.

The race travelled through Vizille before turning east and gradually climbing to the intermediate sprint at La Paute in the valley just north of Le Bourg-d'Oisans. The route then climbed up to Le Freney-d'Oisans before beginning the ascent of the Category 1 Col du Lautaret at 2,058 m (6,752 ft). The route passed through La Grave, halfway up the climb. From the summit of the climb, the race descended south-east through Le Monêtier-les-Bains and La Salle-les-Alpes to the valley floor at Briançon. The route then turned east to Cervières and began the ascent of the Hors catégorie Col d'Izoard, south from Cervières, at 2,360 m (7,743 ft), the highest point reached in the 2014 Tour. From the summit, the race descended 29 km (18 mi) through Arvieux and along the valley south-east, south and then south-west to Guillestre and Risoul. The final climb of the day was the Category 1 hairpin ascent, to the ski station south of Risoul, at 1,855 m (6,086 ft).

Stage 14 result

Rank	Rider	Team	Time
1	Rafał Majka (POL)	Tinkoff–Saxo	5h 08' 27"
2	Vincenzo Nibali (ITA)	Astana	+ 24"
3	Jean-Christophe Péraud (FRA)	Ag2r–La Mondiale	+ 26"
4	Thibaut Pinot (FRA)	FDJ.fr	+ 50"
5	Romain Bardet (FRA)	Ag2r–La Mondiale	+ 50"
6	Tejay van Garderen (USA)	BMC Racing Team	+ 54"
7	Fränk Schleck (LUX)	Trek Factory Racing	+ 1' 01"
8	Laurens ten Dam (NED)	Belkin Pro Cycling	+ 1' 07"
9	Leopold König (CZE)	NetApp–Endura	+ 1' 20"
10	Alejandro Valverde (ESP)	Movistar Team	+ 1' 24"

General classification after stage 14

Rank	Rider	Team	Time
1	Vincenzo Nibali (ITA)	Astana	61h 52' 54"
2	Alejandro Valverde (ESP)	Movistar Team	+ 4' 37"
3	Romain Bardet (FRA)	Ag2r–La Mondiale	+ 4' 50"
4	Thibaut Pinot (FRA)	FDJ.fr	+ 5' 06"
5	Tejay van Garderen (USA)	BMC Racing Team	+ 5' 49"
6	Jean-Christophe Péraud (FRA)	Ag2r–La Mondiale	+ 6' 08"
7	Bauke Mollema (NED)	Belkin Pro Cycling	+ 8' 33"
8	Leopold König (CZE)	NetApp–Endura	+ 9' 32"
9	Laurens ten Dam (NED)	Belkin Pro Cycling	+ 10' 01"
10	Pierre Rolland (FRA)	Team Europcar	+ 10' 48"

== Stage 15 ==
20 July 2014 — Tallard to Nîmes, 222 km (138 mi)

This was an undulating stage which travelled from the department of Hautes-Alpes, through Alpes-de-Haute-Provence, Vaucluse and Bouches-du-Rhône, to Gard. The stage departed from Tallard, heading south-west. Racing officially began on the outskirt of the town.

The race headed south-west to Thèze and then south through Sisteron and Châteauneuf-Val-Saint-Donat. Here, the route turned west to Saint-Étienne-les-Orgues and then followed an indirect route west to Banon. The route descended from Banon, heading south and then west to Saint-Saturnin-lès-Apt. The westerly route continued through Cavaillon to an intermediate sprint at La Galine (Saint-Rémy-de-Provence). The race continued to Tarascon and across the River Rhône to Beaucaire. From Beaucaire, there was a further 28 km (17 mi) to ride, west to the finish at Nîmes.

Stage 15 result

Rank	Rider	Team	Time
1	Alexander Kristoff (NOR)	Team Katusha	4h 56' 43"
2	Heinrich Haussler (AUS)	IAM Cycling	+ 0"
3	Peter Sagan (SVK)	Cannondale	+ 0"
4	André Greipel (GER)	Lotto–Belisol	+ 0"
5	Mark Renshaw (AUS)	Omega Pharma–Quick-Step	+ 0"
6	Bryan Coquard (FRA)	Team Europcar	+ 0"
7	Ramūnas Navardauskas (LTU)	Garmin–Sharp	+ 0"
8	Romain Feillu (FRA)	Bretagne–Séché Environnement	+ 0"
9	Michael Albasini (SUI)	Orica–GreenEDGE	+ 0"
10	Jack Bauer (NZL)	Garmin–Sharp	+ 0"

General classification after stage 15

Rank	Rider	Team	Time
1	Vincenzo Nibali (ITA)	Astana	66h 49' 37"
2	Alejandro Valverde (ESP)	Movistar Team	+ 4' 37"
3	Romain Bardet (FRA)	Ag2r–La Mondiale	+ 4' 50"
4	Thibaut Pinot (FRA)	FDJ.fr	+ 5' 06"
5	Tejay van Garderen (USA)	BMC Racing Team	+ 5' 49"
6	Jean-Christophe Péraud (FRA)	Ag2r–La Mondiale	+ 6' 08"
7	Bauke Mollema (NED)	Belkin Pro Cycling	+ 8' 33"
8	Leopold König (CZE)	NetApp–Endura	+ 9' 32"
9	Laurens ten Dam (NED)	Belkin Pro Cycling	+ 10' 01"
10	Pierre Rolland (FRA)	Team Europcar	+ 10' 48"

== Stage 16 ==
22 July 2014 — Carcassonne to Bagnères-de-Luchon, 237.5 km (148 mi)

After the rest day in Carcassonne, this was a high mountain stage which travelled from the department of Aude, through Ariège, Haute-Garonne and Hautes-Pyrénées, before finishing back in Haute-Garonne. The stage departed west from Carcassonne, with racing officially starting as the route passed Carcassonne Airport.

The route passed through Montréal and La Force before climbing the Category 4 Côte de Fanjeaux at 348 m (1,142 ft). The race then travelled through Belpech and Pamiers, before climbing the Category 4 Côte de Pamiers at 418 m (1,371 ft). The route continued west to Pailhes. The route then turned south-west through Sabarat, Le Mas-d'Azil, Clermont and Lescure to an intermediate sprint at Saint-Girons. From here, the race continued to Moulis and Audressein, before turning west to Argein, Orgibet and Saint-Lary. The route then headed over the climb of the Category 2 Col de Portet d'Aspet at 1,069 m (3,507 ft) before a descent north-west to the outskirts of Sengouagnet. The route continued west through Juzet-d'Izaut and Cazaunous to the Category 3 Col des Ares at 815 m (2,674 ft) and descended south-west through Antichan-de-Frontignes and Fronsac, then heading west to Saléchan, Siradan and on to Mauléon-Barousse. From here, the route turned south-west to ascend the Hors catégorie Port de Balès at 1,755 m (5,758 ft). The race turned south-east at the top of the climb, for the final 21.5 km (13 mi) descent into Bagnères-de-Luchon.

Stage 16 result

Rank	Rider	Team	Time
1	Michael Rogers (AUS)	Tinkoff–Saxo	6h 07' 10"
2	Thomas Voeckler (FRA)	Team Europcar	+ 9"
3	Vasil Kiryienka (BLR)	Team Sky	+ 9"
4	José Serpa (COL)	Lampre–Merida	+ 9"
5	Cyril Gautier (FRA)	Team Europcar	+ 9"
6	Greg Van Avermaet (BEL)	BMC Racing Team	+ 13"
7	Michał Kwiatkowski (POL)	Omega Pharma–Quick-Step	+ 36"
8	Matteo Montaguti (ITA)	Ag2r–La Mondiale	+ 50"
9	Tom-Jelte Slagter (NED)	Garmin–Sharp	+ 2' 11"
10	Tony Gallopin (FRA)	Lotto–Belisol	+ 2' 11"

General classification after stage 16

Rank	Rider	Team	Time
1	Vincenzo Nibali (ITA)	Astana	73h 05' 19"
2	Alejandro Valverde (ESP)	Movistar Team	+ 4' 37"
3	Thibaut Pinot (FRA)	FDJ.fr	+ 5' 06"
4	Jean-Christophe Péraud (FRA)	Ag2r–La Mondiale	+ 6' 08"
5	Romain Bardet (FRA)	Ag2r–La Mondiale	+ 6' 40"
6	Tejay van Garderen (USA)	BMC Racing Team	+ 9' 25"
7	Leopold König (CZE)	NetApp–Endura	+ 9' 32"
8	Laurens ten Dam (NED)	Belkin Pro Cycling	+ 11' 12"
9	Michał Kwiatkowski (POL)	Omega Pharma–Quick-Step	+ 11' 28"
10	Bauke Mollema (NED)	Belkin Pro Cycling	+ 11' 33"

== Stage 17 ==
23 July 2014 — Saint-Gaudens to Saint-Lary Pla d'Adet, 124.5 km (77 mi)

This was a high mountain stage which travelled from the department of Haute-Garonne with a brief incursion into the Lleida province in Spain, back into Haute-Garonne and finished in the department of Hautes-Pyrénées. The stage departed south-west from Saint-Gaudens with racing officially starting just beyond the Valentine district of Saint-Gaudens, on the opposite side of the Garonne River.

The race passed through Martres-de-Rivière before turning south-east on the outskirts of Gourdan-Polignan. The route followed the Garonne River from Loures-Barousse, through Barbazan, with an intermediate sprint at Saint-Béat. From here, the race headed to Fos before turning south and crossing the border into Spain. The route travelled through Les and Bossòst, then turning west and ascending the Category 1 Col du Portillon at 1,292 m (4,239 ft), before re-entering France at the summit. The race then descended west into Bagnères-de-Luchon, before beginning the climb of the Category 1 Col de Peyresourde at 1,569 m (5,148 ft). This was followed by a 9 km (6 mi) descent continuing west into Loudenvielle and Génos. The race then travelled up the hairpin climb of the Category 1 Col de Val Louron-Azet at 1,580 m (5,184 ft) followed by a 10 km (6 mi) descent into Saint-Lary-Soulan. The final climb of the day was the Hors catégorie 12 km (7 mi) ascent to the finish, at Pla d'Adet, at 1,654 m (5,427 ft).

Stage 17 result

Rank	Rider	Team	Time
1	Rafał Majka (POL)	Tinkoff–Saxo	3h 35' 23"
2	Giovanni Visconti (ITA)	Movistar Team	+ 29"
3	Vincenzo Nibali (ITA)	Astana	+ 46"
4	Jean-Christophe Péraud (FRA)	Ag2r–La Mondiale	+ 46"
5	Alessandro De Marchi (ITA)	Cannondale	+ 49"
6	Pierre Rolland (FRA)	Team Europcar	+ 52"
7	Fränk Schleck (LUX)	Trek Factory Racing	+ 1' 12"
8	Bauke Mollema (NED)	Belkin Pro Cycling	+ 1' 12"
9	Nicolas Roche (IRL)	Tinkoff–Saxo	+ 1' 25"
10	Alejandro Valverde (ESP)	Movistar Team	+ 1' 35"

General classification after stage 17

Rank	Rider	Team	Time
1	Vincenzo Nibali (ITA)	Astana	76h 41' 28"
2	Alejandro Valverde (ESP)	Movistar Team	+ 5' 26"
3	Thibaut Pinot (FRA)	FDJ.fr	+ 6' 00"
4	Jean-Christophe Péraud (FRA)	Ag2r–La Mondiale	+ 6' 08"
5	Romain Bardet (FRA)	Ag2r–La Mondiale	+ 7' 34"
6	Tejay van Garderen (USA)	BMC Racing Team	+ 10' 19"
7	Bauke Mollema (NED)	Belkin Pro Cycling	+ 11' 59"
8	Laurens ten Dam (NED)	Belkin Pro Cycling	+ 12' 16"
9	Leopold König (CZE)	NetApp–Endura	+ 12' 40"
10	Pierre Rolland (FRA)	Team Europcar	+ 13' 15"

== Stage 18 ==
24 July 2014 — Pau to Hautacam, 145.5 km (90 mi)

This was a high mountain stage which travelled from the department of Pyrénées-Atlantiques into the department of Hautes-Pyrénées. The stage departed south from Pau with racing officially starting south of the Gelos district of Pau, on the opposite side of the Gave de Pau.

The route travelled south for a few kilometres, before turning east and heading to Pardies-Piétat and then south-east to Nay. The route travelled east through Bénéjacq and over the Category 3 Côte de Benejacq at 470 m (1,542 ft). The race continued east through Pontacq, to Ossun, and then around the southern side of the Tarbes–Lourdes–Pyrénées Airport. The route then continued south from Lanne, Bénac and Orincles. This was followed by the Category 3 Côte de Loucrup at 530 m (1,739 ft), and east to an intermediate sprint at Trébons, before heading south-east through Bagnères-de-Bigorre, Beaudéan and Campan. From Campan, the route headed south-east, south and then south-west, with a long 25.5 km (16 mi) climbing route to La Mongie, before heading west to the summit of the Hors catégorie Col du Tourmalet at 2,115 m (6,939 ft). The race descended west through Barèges, and turned north-west at Luz-Saint-Sauveur, before reaching the valley floor at Villelongue and north to Beaucens. The route then began to climb north into Ayros-Arbouix. From here, the race headed south-east into the final climb of the stage, which was the Hors catégorie 14 km (9 mi) ascending route up to Hautacam, at 1,520 m (4,987 ft).

Stage 18 result

Rank	Rider	Team	Time
1	Vincenzo Nibali (ITA)	Astana	4h 04' 17"
2	Thibaut Pinot (FRA)	FDJ.fr	+ 1' 10"
3	Rafał Majka (POL)	Tinkoff–Saxo	+ 1' 12"
4	Jean-Christophe Péraud (FRA)	Ag2r–La Mondiale	+ 1' 15"
5	Tejay van Garderen (USA)	BMC Racing Team	+ 1' 15"
6	Romain Bardet (FRA)	Ag2r–La Mondiale	+ 1' 53"
7	Bauke Mollema (NED)	Belkin Pro Cycling	+ 1' 57"
8	Leopold König (CZE)	NetApp–Endura	+ 1' 57"
9	Haimar Zubeldia (ESP)	Trek Factory Racing	+ 1' 59"
10	Alejandro Valverde (ESP)	Movistar Team	+ 1' 59"

General classification after stage 18

Rank	Rider	Team	Time
1	Vincenzo Nibali (ITA)	Astana	80h 45' 45"
2	Thibaut Pinot (FRA)	FDJ.fr	+ 7' 10"
3	Jean-Christophe Péraud (FRA)	Ag2r–La Mondiale	+ 7' 23"
4	Alejandro Valverde (ESP)	Movistar Team	+ 7' 25"
5	Romain Bardet (FRA)	Ag2r–La Mondiale	+ 9' 27"
6	Tejay van Garderen (USA)	BMC Racing Team	+ 11' 34"
7	Bauke Mollema (NED)	Belkin Pro Cycling	+ 13' 56"
8	Laurens ten Dam (NED)	Belkin Pro Cycling	+ 14' 15"
9	Leopold König (CZE)	NetApp–Endura	+ 14' 37"
10	Haimar Zubeldia (ESP)	Trek Factory Racing	+ 16' 25"

== Stage 19 ==
25 July 2014 — Maubourguet Pays du Val d'Adour to Bergerac, 208.5 km (130 mi)

This was an undulating stage which travelled from the department of Hautes-Pyrénées, through Gers and Lot-et-Garonne, into the department of Dordogne. The stage departed north-east from Maubourguet with racing officially starting between Maubourguet and Marciac.

The race travelled north-east through Peyrusse-Grande and Vic-Fezensac, to Valence-sur-Baïse. The route then turned north to go through Condom, Nérac, Lavardac and Buzet-sur-Baïse, to an intermediate sprint at Tonneins. The route turned north-east, once again, to Tombebœuf, then north-west to Miramont-de-Guyenne and wound north to Eymet. The route continued north through Fonroque, to Mescoules, and on to Rouffignac-de-Sigoulès. From here, the route wound east to the Category 4 climb of the Côte de Monbazillac at 171 m (561 ft) and turned north to descend for about 10 km (6 mi). The race passed along the western side of the Bergerac Dordogne Périgord Airport, before the route finally turned east to cross the Dordogne River, into the finish in Bergerac.

Stage 19 result

Rank	Rider	Team	Time
1	Ramūnas Navardauskas (LTU)	Garmin–Sharp	4h 43' 41"
2	John Degenkolb (GER)	Giant–Shimano	+ 7"
3	Alexander Kristoff (NOR)	Team Katusha	+ 7"
4	Mark Renshaw (AUS)	Omega Pharma–Quick-Step	+ 7"
5	Daniele Bennati (ITA)	Tinkoff–Saxo	+ 7"
6	Alessandro Petacchi (ITA)	Omega Pharma–Quick-Step	+ 7"
7	Samuel Dumoulin (FRA)	Ag2r–La Mondiale	+ 7"
8	Julien Simon (FRA)	Cofidis	+ 7"
9	Sep Vanmarcke (BEL)	Belkin Pro Cycling	+ 7"
10	Jürgen Roelandts (BEL)	Lotto–Belisol	+ 7"

General classification after stage 19

Rank	Rider	Team	Time
1	Vincenzo Nibali (ITA)	Astana	85h 29' 33"
2	Thibaut Pinot (FRA)	FDJ.fr	+ 7' 10"
3	Jean-Christophe Péraud (FRA)	Ag2r–La Mondiale	+ 7' 23"
4	Alejandro Valverde (ESP)	Movistar Team	+ 7' 25"
5	Romain Bardet (FRA)	Ag2r–La Mondiale	+ 9' 27"
6	Tejay van Garderen (USA)	BMC Racing Team	+ 11' 34"
7	Bauke Mollema (NED)	Belkin Pro Cycling	+ 13' 56"
8	Laurens ten Dam (NED)	Belkin Pro Cycling	+ 14' 15"
9	Leopold König (CZE)	NetApp–Endura	+ 14' 37"
10	Haimar Zubeldia (ESP)	Trek Factory Racing	+ 16' 25"

== Stage 20 ==
26 July 2014 — Bergerac to Périgueux, 54 km (34 mi) (ITT)

This short stage took place entirely in the department of Dordogne and was an individual time trial on an undulating road. The route headed north-west out of Bergerac, before turning north to the outskirts of Ginestet and Maurens, and on to the first time check at Beleymas. The road then bore north-east to Villamblard and north through Manzac-sur-Vern, before turning north-east again, heading to the second time check on the outskirts of Coursac. The route then zig-zagged north-east to the Côte de Coulounieix-Chamiers before crossing the River Isle and finishing in Périgueux.

Stage 20 result

Rank	Rider	Team	Time
1	Tony Martin (GER)	Omega Pharma–Quick-Step	1h 06' 21"
2	Tom Dumoulin (NED)	Giant–Shimano	+ 1' 39"
3	Jan Bárta (CZE)	NetApp–Endura	+ 1' 47"
4	Vincenzo Nibali (ITA)	Astana	+ 1' 58"
5	Leopold König (CZE)	NetApp–Endura	+ 2' 02"
6	Tejay van Garderen (USA)	BMC Racing Team	+ 2' 08"
7	Jean-Christophe Péraud (FRA)	Ag2r–La Mondiale	+ 2' 27"
8	Sylvain Chavanel (FRA)	IAM Cycling	+ 2' 36"
9	Markel Irizar (ESP)	Trek Factory Racing	+ 2' 39"
10	Daniel Oss (ITA)	BMC Racing Team	+ 2' 58"

General classification after stage 20

Rank	Rider	Team	Time
1	Vincenzo Nibali (ITA)	Astana	86h 37' 52"
2	Jean-Christophe Péraud (FRA)	Ag2r–La Mondiale	+ 7' 52"
3	Thibaut Pinot (FRA)	FDJ.fr	+ 8' 24"
4	Alejandro Valverde (ESP)	Movistar Team	+ 9' 55"
5	Tejay van Garderen (USA)	BMC Racing Team	+ 11' 44"
6	Romain Bardet (FRA)	Ag2r–La Mondiale	+ 11' 46"
7	Leopold König (CZE)	NetApp–Endura	+ 14' 41"
8	Haimar Zubeldia (ESP)	Trek Factory Racing	+ 18' 12"
9	Laurens ten Dam (NED)	Belkin Pro Cycling	+ 18' 20"
10	Bauke Mollema (NED)	Belkin Pro Cycling	+ 21' 24"

== Stage 21 ==
27 July 2014 — Évry to Paris Champs-Élysées, 137.5 km (85 mi)

This was an undulating stage which travelled from the department of Essonne, through Hauts-de-Seine into Paris. The stage departed from Évry, with racing officially starting at Bondoufle.

The riders travelled south and west around the Brétigny-sur-Orge Air Base to Arpajon. The route continued west to the Category 4 climb of Côte de Briis-sous-Forges at 172 m (564 ft) and headed north through Orsay and Vauhallan. The race then headed east through Massy, north to Châtenay-Malabry, and on through Clamart and Meudon to Issy-les-Moulineaux, before crossing the River Seine and the Île Saint-Germain. The race turned north-east and travelled along the Right Bank of the Seine to Pont Alexandre III, where the riders crossed the Seine, again, and turned left, passing Les Invalides. The race followed the river along to the Pont du Carrousel and crossed the river for a final time. The riders then turned left to travel along the Rue de Rivoli, through the Place de la Concorde and onto the Champs-Élysées. The race then began ten circuits around central Paris, heading up the Champs-Élysées and around the Arc de Triomphe on the Place de l'Étoile. The riders returned, back down the opposite side of the Champs-Élysées, and around the Jardin des Tuileries. Finally, back along the Rue de Rivoli, and through the Place de la Concorde, to the finish line on the Champs-Élysées.

The La Course by Le Tour de France rode 13 laps of the traditional course on the Champs-Élysées a few hours before the men arrived.

Stage 21 result

Rank	Rider	Team	Time
1	Marcel Kittel (GER)	Giant–Shimano	3h 20' 50"
2	Alexander Kristoff (NOR)	Team Katusha	+ 0"
3	Ramūnas Navardauskas (LTU)	Garmin–Sharp	+ 0"
4	André Greipel (GER)	Lotto–Belisol	+ 0"
5	Mark Renshaw (AUS)	Omega Pharma–Quick-Step	+ 0"
6	Bernhard Eisel (AUT)	Team Sky	+ 0"
7	Bryan Coquard (FRA)	Team Europcar	+ 0"
8	Alessandro Petacchi (ITA)	Omega Pharma–Quick-Step	+ 0"
9	Peter Sagan (SVK)	Cannondale	+ 0"
10	Romain Feillu (FRA)	Bretagne–Séché Environnement	+ 0"

Final general classification

Rank	Rider	Team	Time
1	Vincenzo Nibali (ITA)	Astana	89h 59' 06"
2	Jean-Christophe Péraud (FRA)	Ag2r–La Mondiale	+ 7' 37"
3	Thibaut Pinot (FRA)	FDJ.fr	+ 8' 15"
4	Alejandro Valverde (ESP)	Movistar Team	+ 9' 40"
5	Tejay van Garderen (USA)	BMC Racing Team	+ 11' 24"
6	Romain Bardet (FRA)	Ag2r–La Mondiale	+ 11' 26"
7	Leopold König (CZE)	NetApp–Endura	+ 14' 32"
8	Haimar Zubeldia (ESP)	Trek Factory Racing	+ 17' 57"
9	Laurens ten Dam (NED)	Belkin Pro Cycling	+ 18' 11"
10	Bauke Mollema (NED)	Belkin Pro Cycling	+ 21' 15"
