= Col des Ares =

Mountain pass in Haute-Garonne, France

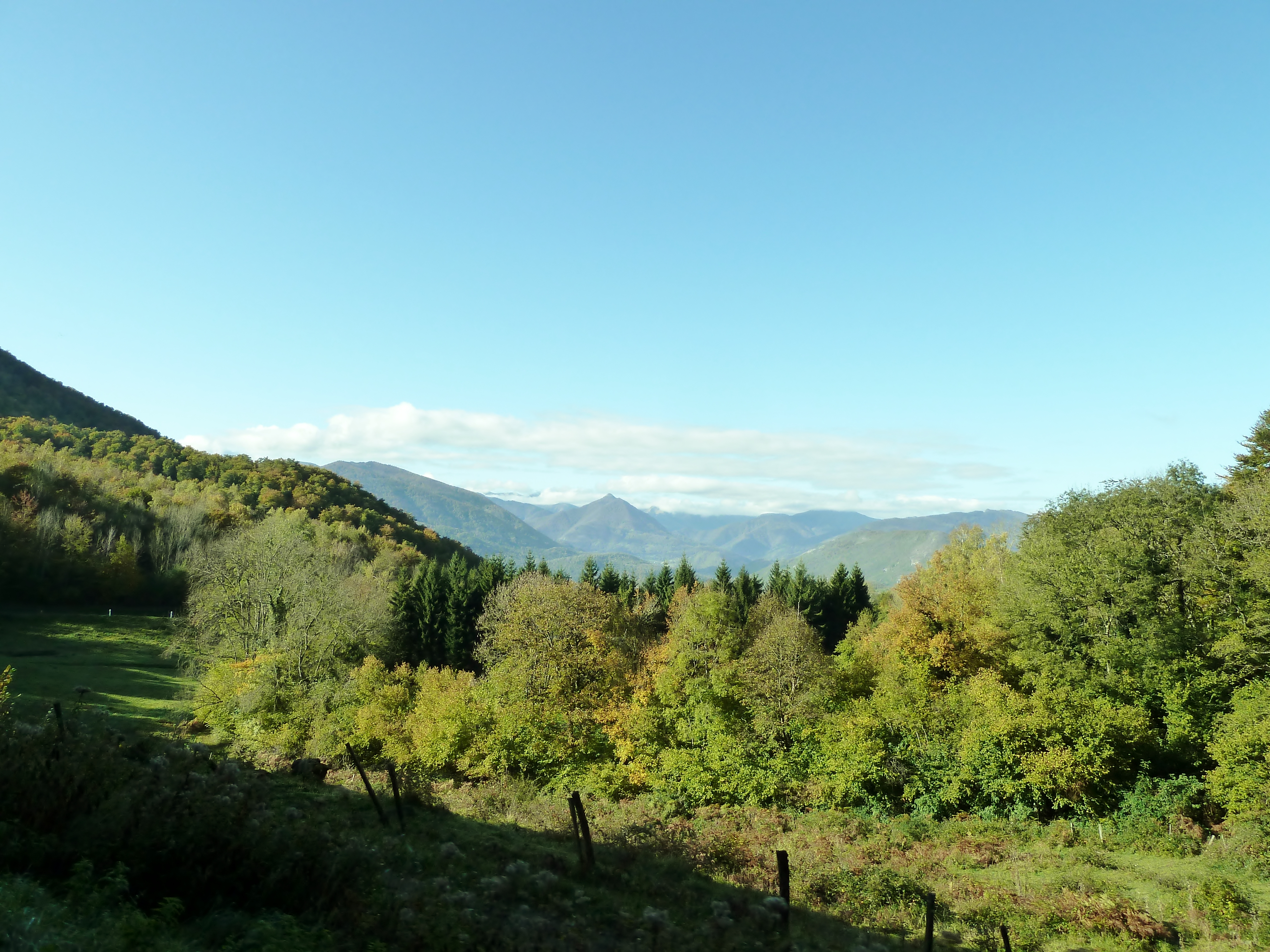
- Col des Ares

- Location within Pyrenees
- Elevation: 797 m (2,615 ft)
- Traversed by: D618

Third Approach
- Location: Haute-Garonne, France
- Range: Pyrenees
- Coordinates: 42°59′27.7″N 0°41′38.4″E

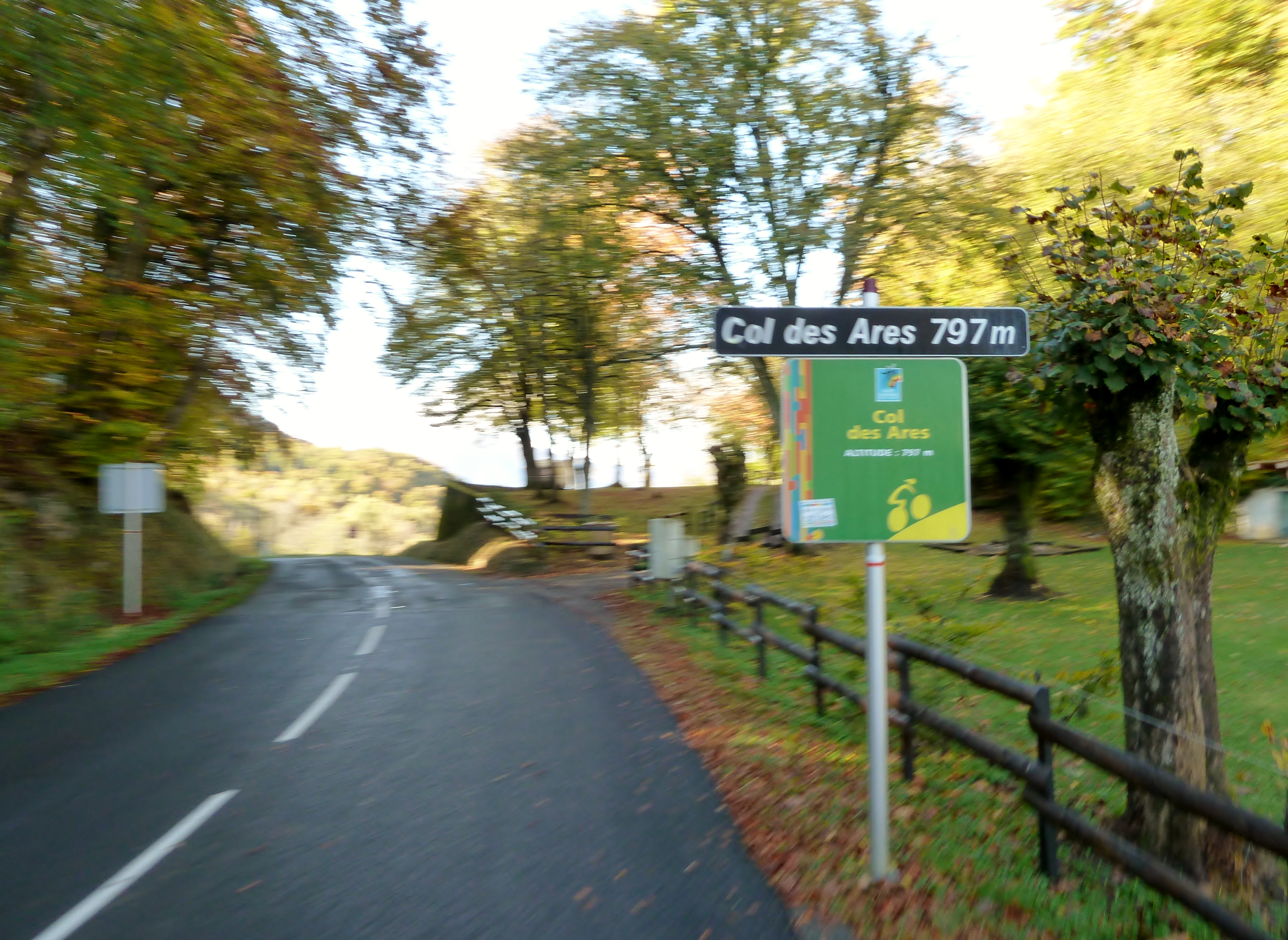
Summit of Col des Ares

Col des Ares (elevation 797 m (2,615 ft)) is a mountain pass located in Haute-Garonne, between Juzet-d'Izaut and Fronsac, some thirty kilometres north of Bagnères-de-Luchon, and south-west of Aspet.

== Details of the climbs ==
From Fronsac (west), the ascent is 8.4 km (5.2 mi) long. Over this distance, the climb gains 330 m (1,080 ft) in height at an average of 3.9%, with a maximum gradient of 11%.

From La Moulette, near Cazaunous, (east), the climb is 6.7 km (4.2 mi) long climbing 310 m (1,020 ft) at an average of 4.6%. Before reaching Juzet-d'Izaut, the D618 crosses the Col de Buret 599 m (1,965 ft).

== Tour de France ==
The Col des Ares was first used in the Tour de France in 1910 and has appeared frequently since. The leader over the summit in 1910 was Octave Lapize. The col was last crossed on Stage 12 of the 2017 Tour de France.

=== Appearances in Tour de France (since 1947) ===
Year	Stage	Category	Start	Finish	Leader at the summit
2017	12	2	Pau	Peyragudes	Thomas De Gendt (BEL)
2014	16	2	Carcassonne	Bagnères-de-Luchon	Thomas Voeckler (FRA)
2012	17	2	Bagnères-de-Luchon	Peyragudes	Thomas Voeckler (FRA)
2010	15	2	Pamiers	Bagnères-de-Luchon	Thomas Voeckler (FRA)
2008	9	3	Toulouse	Bagnères-de-Bigorre	Sebastian Lang (DEU)
2006	12	2	Bagnères-de-Luchon	Carcassonne	Michael Rasmussen (DEN)
2004	13	3	Lannemezan	Plateau de Beille	Sylvain Chavanel (FRA)
1999	15	2	Saint-Gaudens	Piau-Engaly	Mariano Piccoli (ITA)
1997	10	3	Bagnères-de-Luchon	Andorra	Laurent Brochard (FRA)
1989	11	3	Bagnères-de-Luchon	Blagnac	Gert-Jan Theunisse (NED)
1984	11	3	Pau	Guzet-Neige	Theo de Rooij (NED)
1981	6	3	Saint-Gaudens	Saint-Lary Soulan (Pla d'Adet)	Bernard Becaas (FRA)
1972	9	3	Bagnères-de-Luchon	Colomiers	Christian Raymond (FRA)
1968	14	2	la Seu d'Urgell	Canet-Plage	Franco Bitossi (ITA)
1966	11	3	Pau	Bagnères-de-Luchon	Joaquim Galera (ESP)
1964	15	3	Toulouse	Bagnères-de-Luchon	Joaquim Galera (ESP)
1963	12	3	Bagnères-de-Luchon	Toulouse	Rik Van Looy (BEL)
1962	14	3	Bagnères-de-Luchon	Carcassonne	André Darrigade (FRA)
1961	16	3	Toulouse	Superbagnères	Imerio Massignan (ITA)
1960	12	3	Bagnères-de-Luchon	Toulouse	André Darrigade (FRA)
1957	17		Ax-les-Thermes	Saint-Gaudens	Group
1956	13	3	Bagnères-de-Luchon	Toulouse	Bruno Monti (ITA)
1952	17		Toulouse	Bagnères-de-Bigorre	Group
1951	15		Bagnères-de-Luchon	Carcassonne	José Serra (ESP)
1948	8		Lourdes	Toulouse	Jean Robic (FRA)
1947	14		Carcassonne	Bagnères-de-Luchon	Albert Bourlon (FRA)

From 1947 to 1952, and in 1957, the climb was not classified.
