= Bénac =

Bénac is the name of the following French communes:

- Bénac, Ariège, in the Ariège department
- Bénac, Hautes-Pyrénées, in the Hautes-Pyrénées department
