= Luquet =

- Commune
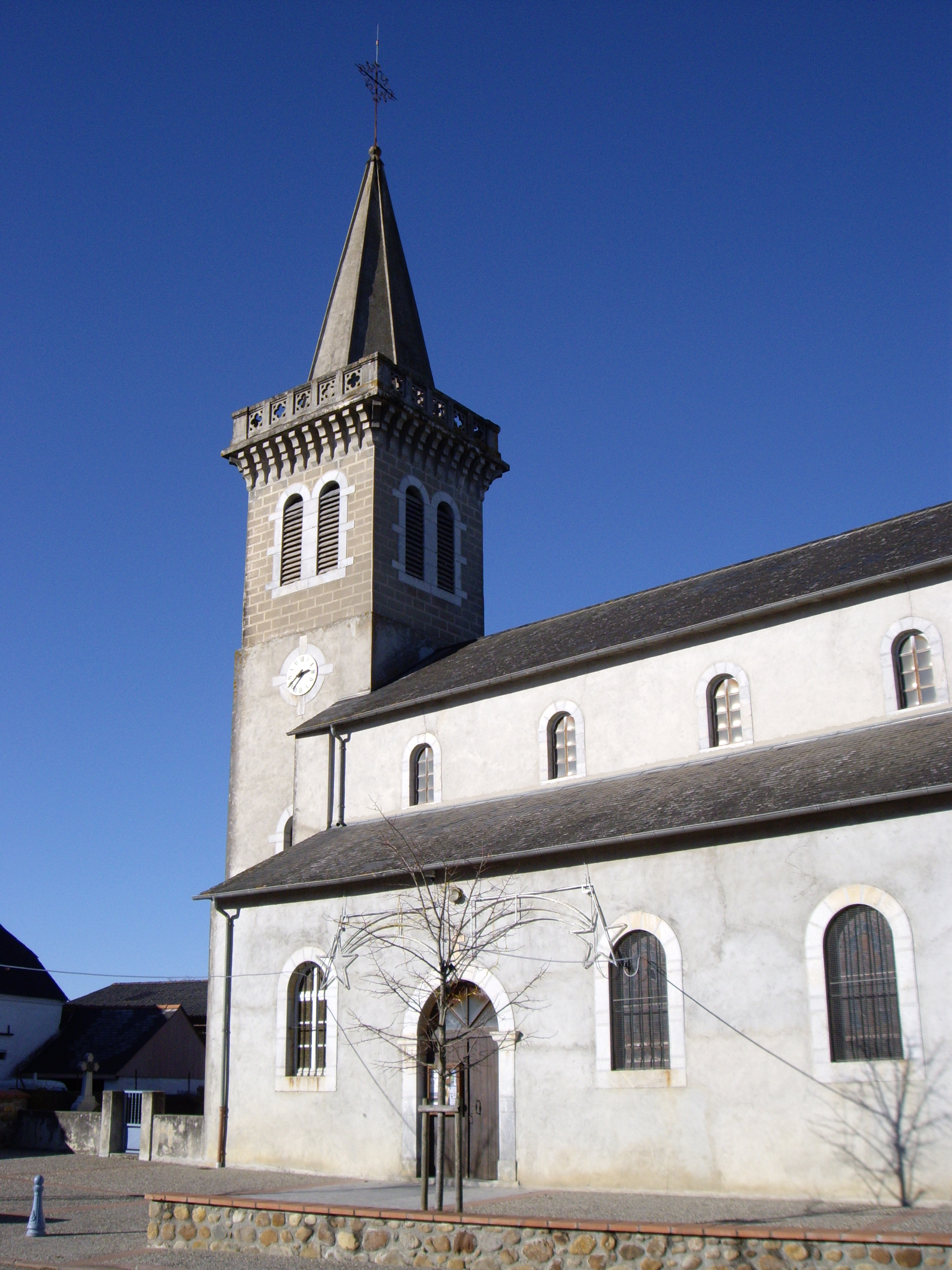
- The church of Saint-Laurent

- Coat of arms
- Location of Luquet
- Location within France Location within Occitanie
- Coordinates: 43°15′52″N 0°07′04″W
- Country: France
- Region: Occitania
- Department: Hautes-Pyrénées
- Arrondissement: Tarbes
- Canton: Ossun
- Intercommunality: CA Tarbes-Lourdes-Pyrénées

Government
  - Mayor (2020–2026): Philippe Mascle
- Area^{1}: 8.17 km^{2} (3.15 sq mi)
- Elevation: 380 m (1,250 ft)
- Highest elevation: 409 m (1,342 ft)
- Lowest elevation: 346 m (1,135 ft)
- Population (2023): 426
  - Density: 52.1/km^{2} (135/sq mi)
- Time zone: UTC+01:00 (CET)
  - Summer (DST): UTC+02:00 (CEST)
- INSEE/Postal code: 65292 /65320
- ^{1} French Land Register data, which excludes lakes, ponds, glaciers > 1 km^{2} (0.386 sq mi or 247 acres) and river estuaries.

Luquet (French pronunciation: [lykɛ]) is a commune in the Hautes-Pyrénées department in south-western France.

Together with Gardères, the commune forms an enclave of Hautes-Pyrénées within the department of Pyrénées-Atlantiques. A neighbouring second enclave comprises the communes of Escaunets, Séron and Villenave-près-Béarn.

== See also ==
- Communes of the Hautes-Pyrénées department
