= Villenave-près-Béarn =

- Commune
- Coat of arms
- Location of Villenave-près-Béarn
- Location within France Location within Occitanie
- Coordinates: 43°22′01″N 0°05′41″W
- Country: France
- Region: Occitania
- Department: Hautes-Pyrénées
- Arrondissement: Tarbes
- Canton: Vic-en-Bigorre
- Intercommunality: Adour Madiran

Government
  - Mayor (2020–2026): Carine Arruyer
- Area^{1}: 3.09 km^{2} (1.19 sq mi)
- Elevation: 400 m (1,300 ft)
- Highest elevation: 362 m (1,188 ft)
- Lowest elevation: 259 m (850 ft)
- Population (2023): 70
  - Density: 23/km^{2} (59/sq mi)
- Time zone: UTC+01:00 (CET)
  - Summer (DST): UTC+02:00 (CEST)
- INSEE/Postal code: 65476 /65500
- ^{1} French Land Register data, which excludes lakes, ponds, glaciers > 1 km^{2} (0.386 sq mi or 247 acres) and river estuaries.

Villenave-près-Béarn (French pronunciation: [vilnav pʁɛ beaʁn], literally Villenave near Béarn; Occitan: Vièlanava) is a commune in the Hautes-Pyrénées department in south-western France.

Together with Escaunets and Séron, the commune forms an enclave of Hautes-Pyrénées within the department of Pyrénées-Atlantiques. A neighbouring second enclave comprises the communes of Gardères and Luquet.

== See also ==
- Communes of the Hautes-Pyrénées department
