= Barry, Hautes-Pyrénées =

Barry
- Commune
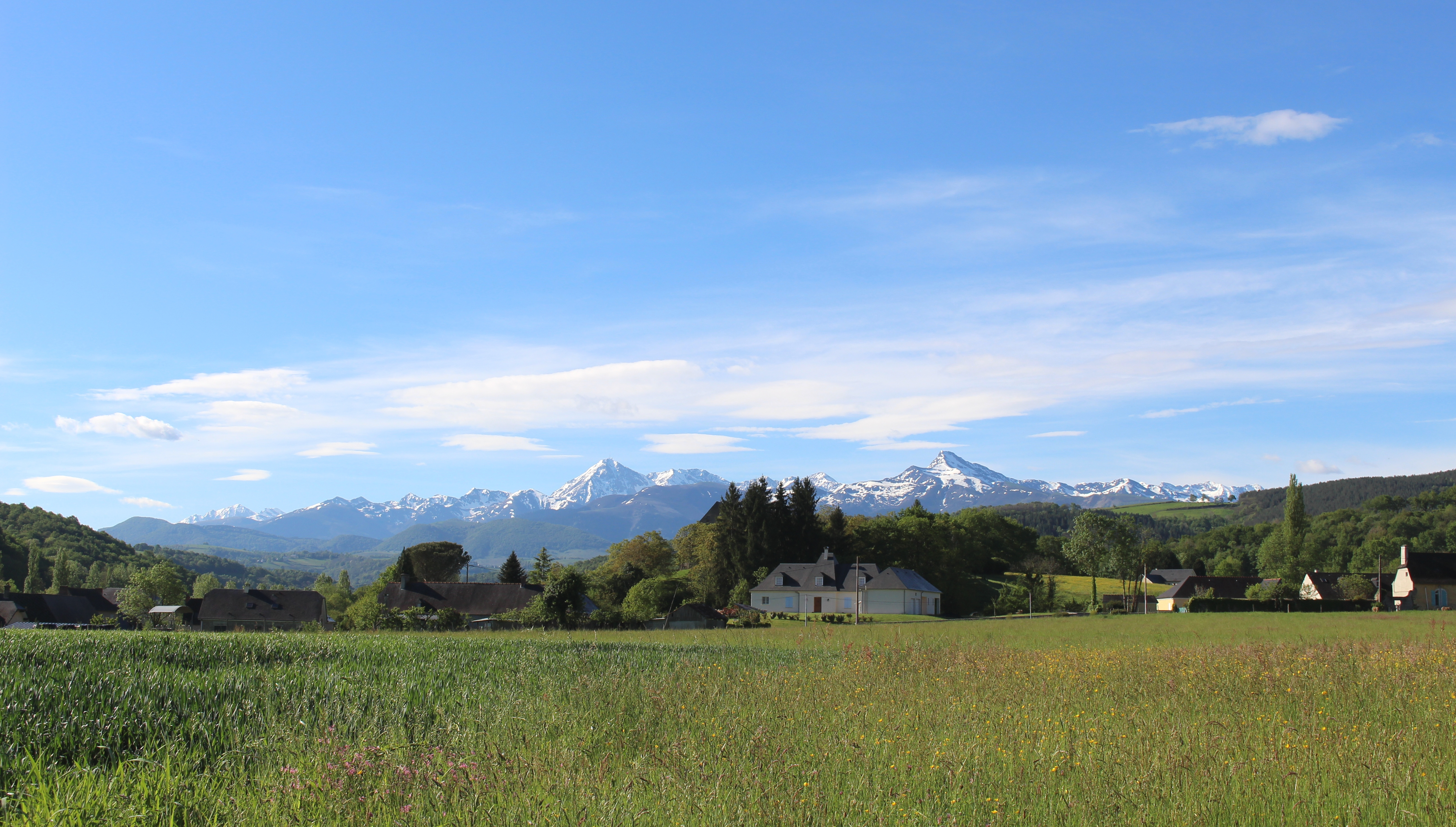
- View of Barry

- Coat of arms
- Location of Barry
- Location within France Location within Occitanie
- Coordinates: 43°08′48″N 0°01′25″E
- Country: France
- Region: Occitania
- Department: Hautes-Pyrénées
- Arrondissement: Tarbes
- Canton: Ossun
- Intercommunality: CA Tarbes-Lourdes-Pyrénées

Government
  - Mayor (2020–2026): Laurent Penin
- Area^{1}: 2.54 km^{2} (0.98 sq mi)
- Elevation: 400 m (1,300 ft)
- Highest elevation: 575 m (1,886 ft)
- Lowest elevation: 354 m (1,161 ft)
- Population (2023): 136
  - Density: 53.5/km^{2} (139/sq mi)
- Time zone: UTC+01:00 (CET)
  - Summer (DST): UTC+02:00 (CEST)
- INSEE/Postal code: 65067 /65380
- ^{1} French Land Register data, which excludes lakes, ponds, glaciers > 1 km^{2} (0.386 sq mi or 247 acres) and river estuaries.

Barry (French pronunciation: [baʁi]; Occitan: Barri) is a commune in the Hautes-Pyrénées department in southwestern France.

== Population ==
Historical population
Year	Pop.	±% p.a.
1968	64	—
1975	65	+0.22%
1982	65	+0.00%
1990	78	+2.31%
1999	112	+4.10%
2007	135	+2.36%
2012	131	−0.60%
2017	125	−0.93%
2023	136	+1.42%
Source: INSEE

== See also ==
- Communes of the Hautes-Pyrénées department
