= Séron =

- Commune
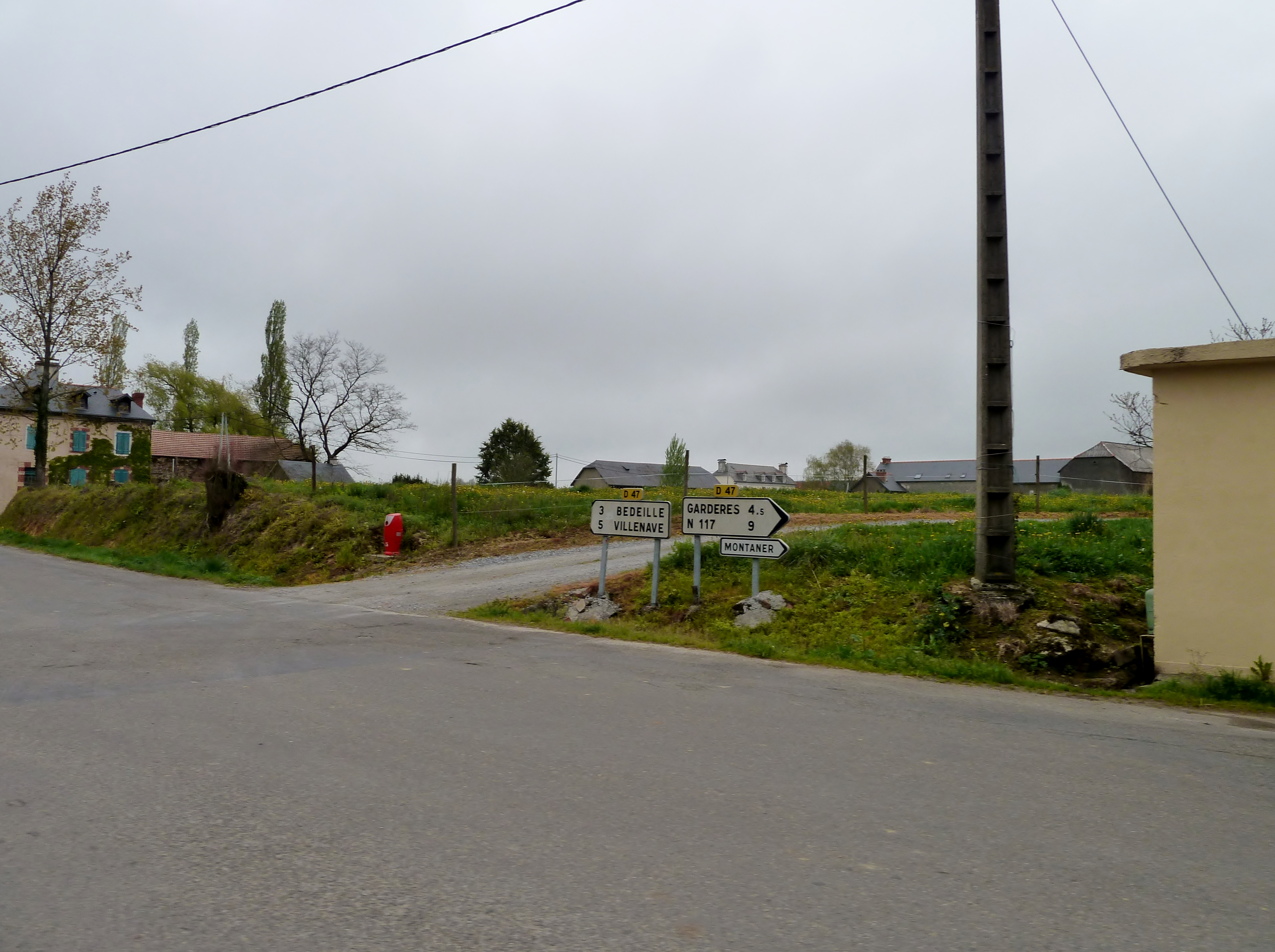
- A general view of the village

- Coat of arms
- Location of Séron
- Location within France Location within Occitanie
- Coordinates: 43°19′23″N 0°05′54″W
- Country: France
- Region: Occitania
- Department: Hautes-Pyrénées
- Arrondissement: Tarbes
- Canton: Ossun
- Intercommunality: CA Tarbes-Lourdes-Pyrénées

Government
  - Mayor (2020–2026): Chantal Paulien
- Area^{1}: 9.29 km^{2} (3.59 sq mi)
- Elevation: 370 m (1,210 ft)
- Highest elevation: 386 m (1,266 ft)
- Lowest elevation: 290 m (950 ft)
- Population (2023): 328
  - Density: 35.3/km^{2} (91.4/sq mi)
- Time zone: UTC+01:00 (CET)
  - Summer (DST): UTC+02:00 (CEST)
- INSEE/Postal code: 65422 /65320
- ^{1} French Land Register data, which excludes lakes, ponds, glaciers > 1 km^{2} (0.386 sq mi or 247 acres) and river estuaries.

Séron (French pronunciation: [seʁɔ̃]; Occitan: Seron) is a commune in the Hautes-Pyrénées department in south-western France.

Together with Escaunets and Villenave-près-Béarn, the commune forms an enclave of Hautes-Pyrénées within the department of Pyrénées-Atlantiques. A neighbouring second enclave comprises the communes of Gardères and Luquet.

== See also ==
- Communes of the Hautes-Pyrénées department
