= Gardères =

- Commune
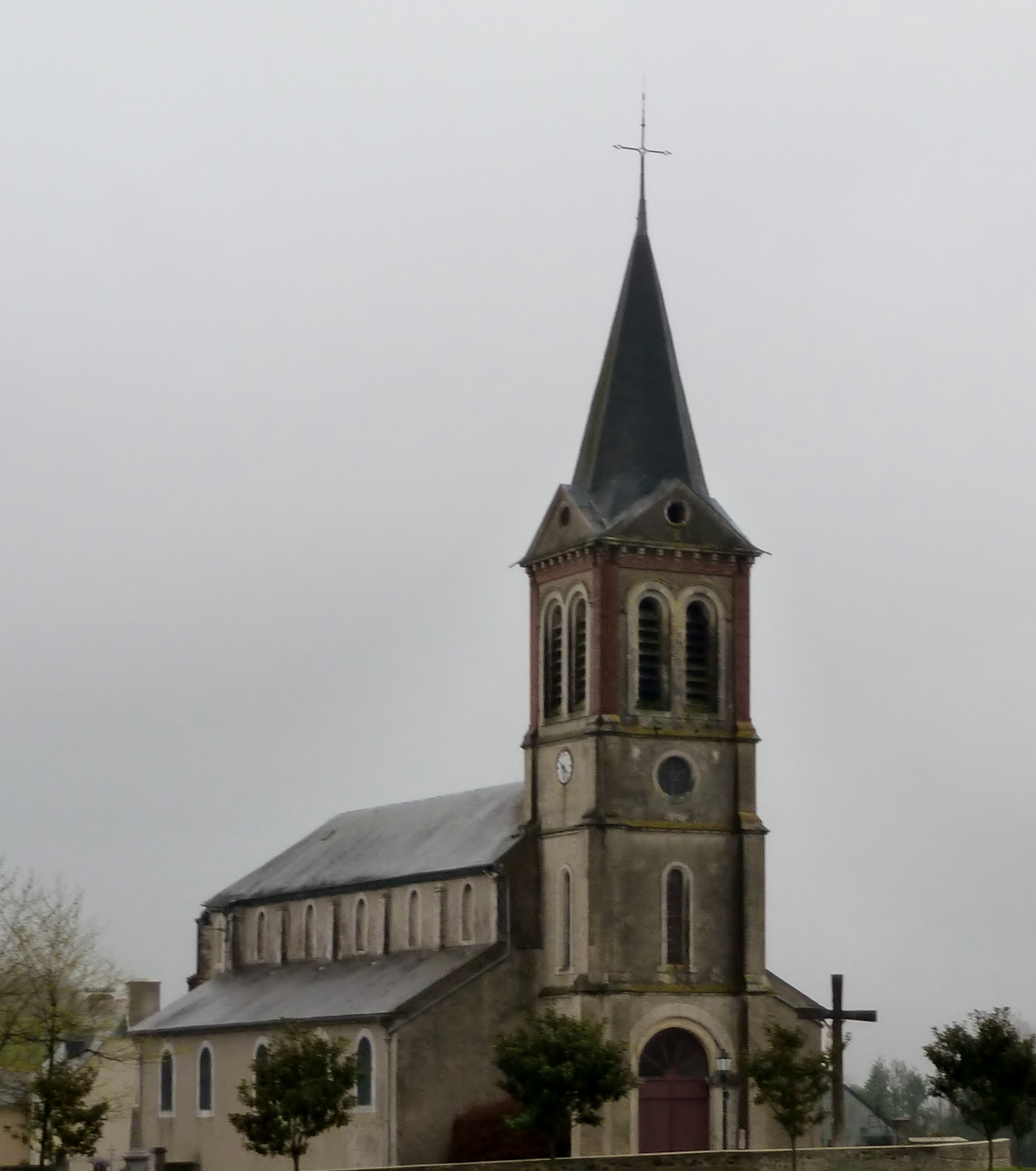
- The church of Gardères

- Coat of arms
- Location of Gardères
- Location within France Location within Occitanie
- Coordinates: 43°16′44″N 0°06′29″W
- Country: France
- Region: Occitania
- Department: Hautes-Pyrénées
- Arrondissement: Tarbes
- Canton: Ossun
- Intercommunality: CA Tarbes-Lourdes-Pyrénées

Government
  - Mayor (2021–2026): Christine Conte
- Area^{1}: 15.23 km^{2} (5.88 sq mi)
- Elevation: 399 m (1,309 ft)
- Highest elevation: 413 m (1,355 ft)
- Lowest elevation: 337 m (1,106 ft)
- Population (2023): 445
  - Density: 29.2/km^{2} (75.7/sq mi)
- Time zone: UTC+01:00 (CET)
  - Summer (DST): UTC+02:00 (CEST)
- INSEE/Postal code: 65185 /65320
- ^{1} French Land Register data, which excludes lakes, ponds, glaciers > 1 km^{2} (0.386 sq mi or 247 acres) and river estuaries.

Gardères (French pronunciation: [ɡaʁdɛʁ]; Occitan: Gardèras) is a commune in the Hautes-Pyrénées department in south-western France.

Together with Luquet, the commune forms an enclave of Hautes-Pyrénées within the department of Pyrénées-Atlantiques. A neighbouring second enclave comprises the communes of Escaunets, Séron and Villenave-près-Béarn.

== See also ==
- Communes of the Hautes-Pyrénées department
