= Visker =

- Commune
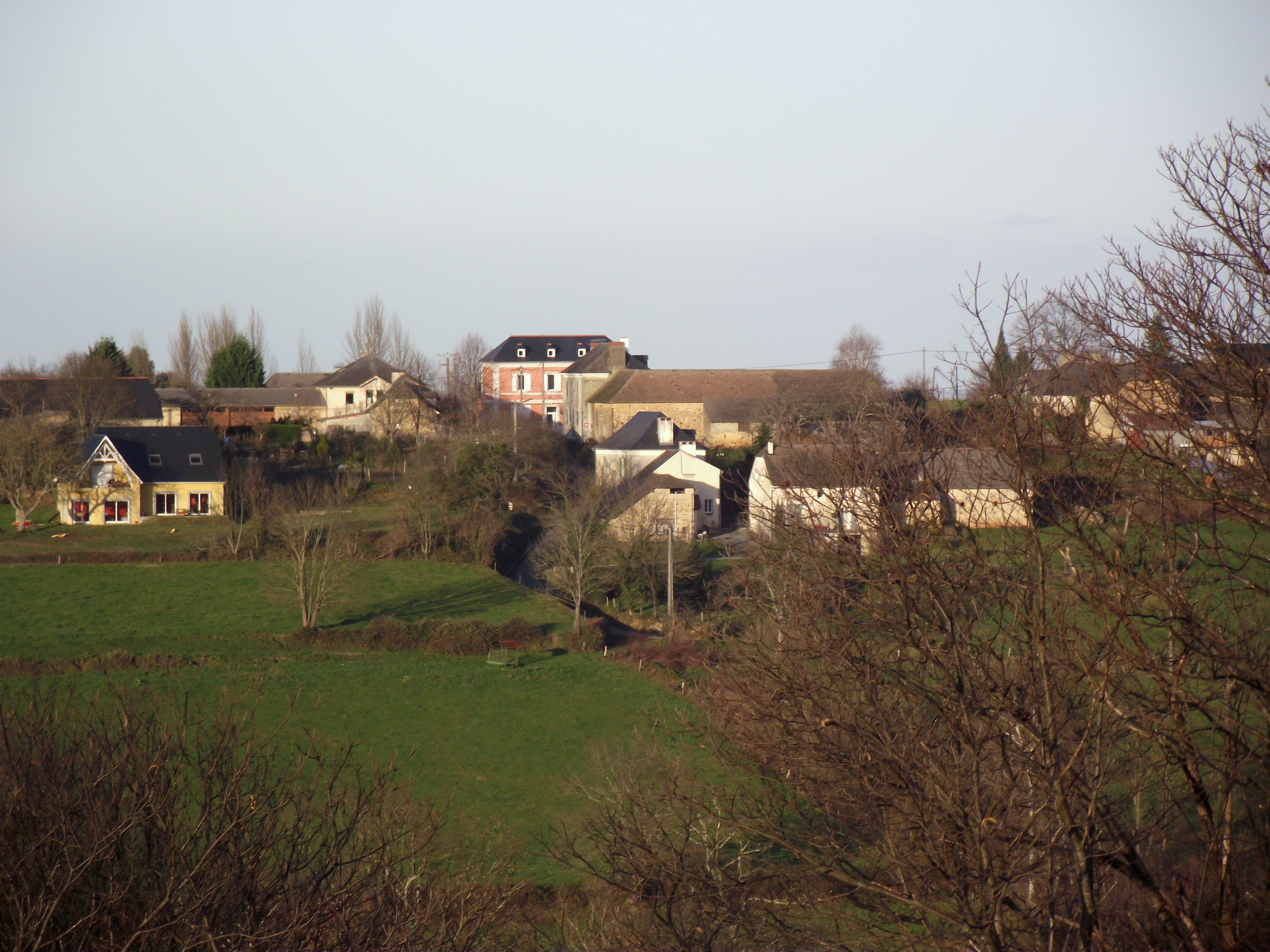
- The centre of the village

- Coat of arms
- Location of Visker
- Location within France Location within Occitanie
- Coordinates: 43°08′22″N 0°03′59″E
- Country: France
- Region: Occitania
- Department: Hautes-Pyrénées
- Arrondissement: Tarbes
- Canton: Ossun
- Intercommunality: CA Tarbes-Lourdes-Pyrénées

Government
  - Mayor (2020–2026): Maryse Verdoux
- Area^{1}: 4.16 km^{2} (1.61 sq mi)
- Elevation: 550 m (1,800 ft)
- Highest elevation: 560 m (1,840 ft)
- Lowest elevation: 397 m (1,302 ft)
- Population (2023): 362
  - Density: 87.0/km^{2} (225/sq mi)
- Time zone: UTC+01:00 (CET)
  - Summer (DST): UTC+02:00 (CEST)
- INSEE/Postal code: 65479 /65200
- ^{1} French Land Register data, which excludes lakes, ponds, glaciers > 1 km^{2} (0.386 sq mi or 247 acres) and river estuaries.

Visker is a commune in the Hautes-Pyrénées department in south-western France.

== See also ==
- Communes of the Hautes-Pyrénées department
