= Canton of Ossun =

Administrative division of France

Coordinates: 43.18°N 0.03°W

The canton of Ossun is an administrative division of the Hautes-Pyrénées department, southwestern France. Its borders were not modified at the French canton reorganisation which came into effect in March 2015. Its seat is in Ossun.

It consists of the following communes:

1. Averan
2. Azereix
3. Barry
4. Bénac
5. Gardères
6. Hibarette
7. Juillan
8. Lamarque-Pontacq
9. Lanne
10. Layrisse
11. Loucrup
12. Louey
13. Luquet
14. Orincles
15. Ossun
16. Séron
17. Visker
