= Layrisse =

- Commune
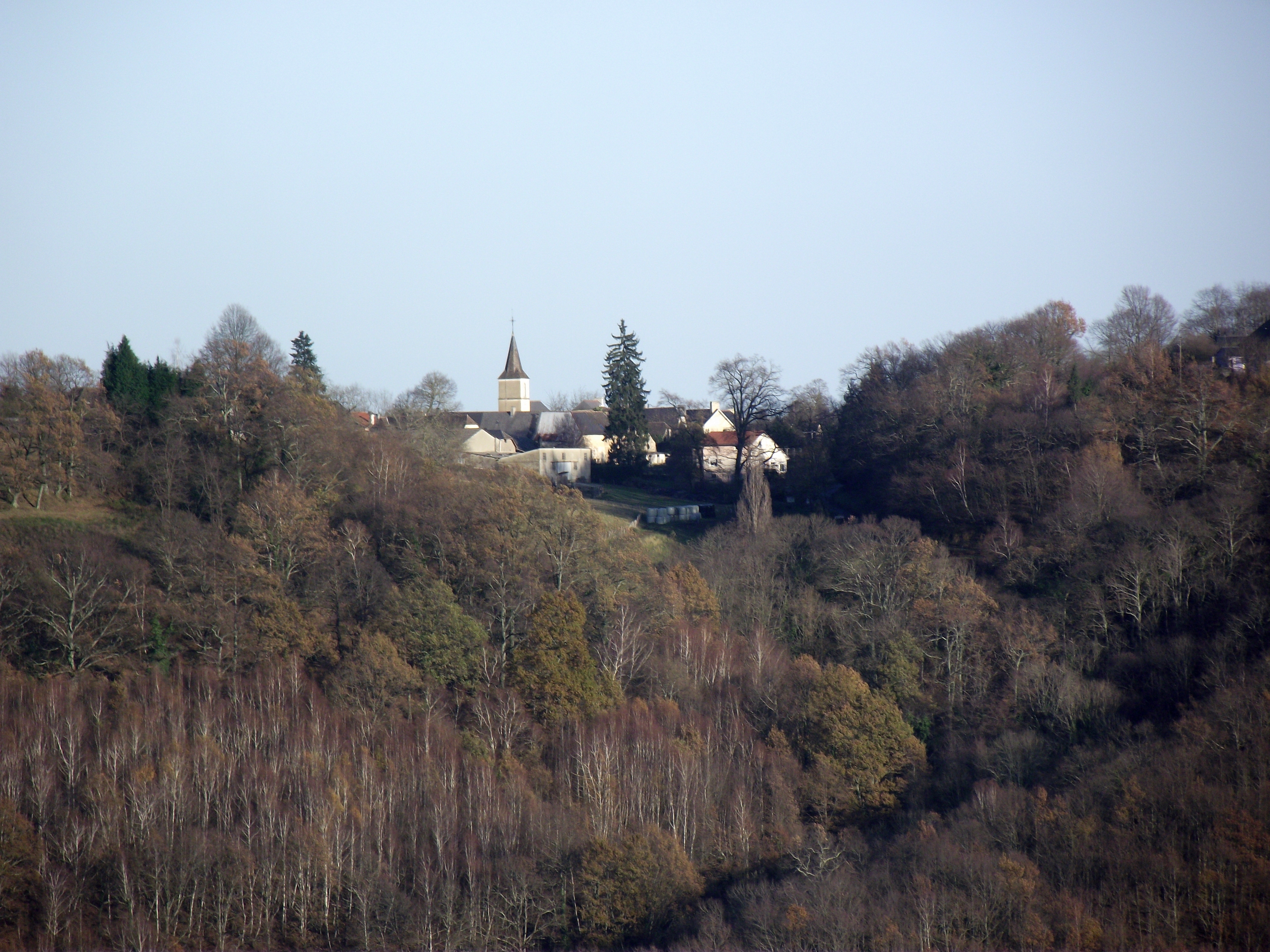
- The village seen from Averan

- Coat of arms
- Location of Layrisse
- Location within France Location within Occitanie
- Coordinates: 43°08′25″N 0°02′23″E
- Country: France
- Region: Occitania
- Department: Hautes-Pyrénées
- Arrondissement: Tarbes
- Canton: Ossun
- Intercommunality: CA Tarbes-Lourdes-Pyrénées

Government
  - Mayor (2020–2026): Vincent Mascaras
- Area^{1}: 3.33 km^{2} (1.29 sq mi)
- Elevation: 480 m (1,570 ft)
- Highest elevation: 529 m (1,736 ft)
- Lowest elevation: 378 m (1,240 ft)
- Population (2023): 249
  - Density: 74.8/km^{2} (194/sq mi)
- Time zone: UTC+01:00 (CET)
  - Summer (DST): UTC+02:00 (CEST)
- INSEE/Postal code: 65268 /65380
- ^{1} French Land Register data, which excludes lakes, ponds, glaciers > 1 km^{2} (0.386 sq mi or 247 acres) and river estuaries.

Layrisse (French pronunciation: [lɛʁis]; Occitan: Lairiça) is a commune in the Hautes-Pyrénées department in south-western France.

It has a land area of 3.33 square kilometers situated between Visker on the Northwest and Orincles on the Southeast.

== See also ==
- Communes of the Hautes-Pyrénées department
