= Lamarque-Pontacq =

- Commune
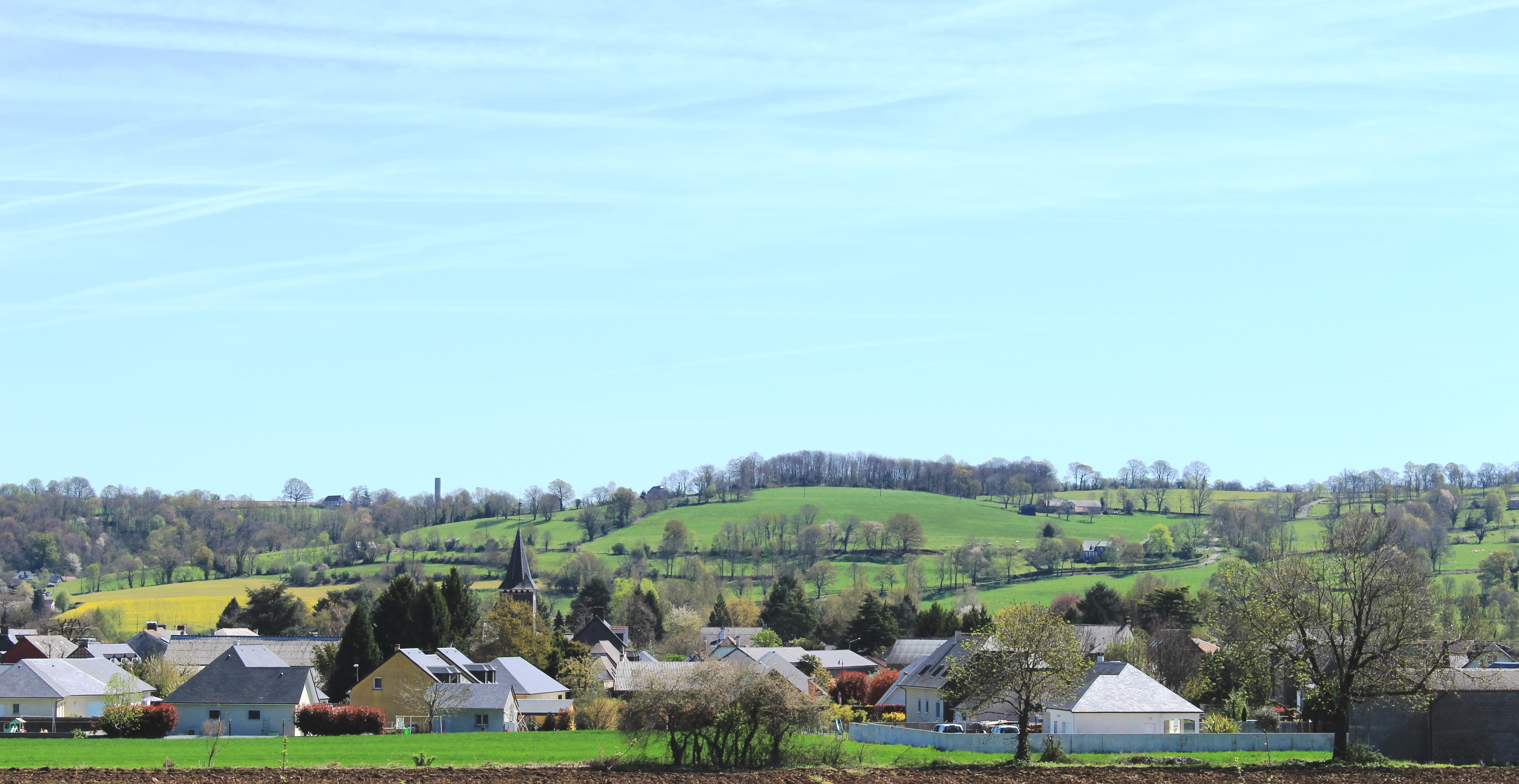

- Coat of arms
- Location of Lamarque-Pontacq
- Location within France Location within Occitanie
- Coordinates: 43°10′41″N 0°06′48″W
- Country: France
- Region: Occitania
- Department: Hautes-Pyrénées
- Arrondissement: Tarbes
- Canton: Ossun
- Intercommunality: CA Tarbes-Lourdes-Pyrénées

Government
  - Mayor (2020–2026): Marc Begorre
- Area^{1}: 10.85 km^{2} (4.19 sq mi)
- Elevation: 350 m (1,150 ft)
- Highest elevation: 510 m (1,670 ft)
- Lowest elevation: 363 m (1,191 ft)
- Population (2023): 862
  - Density: 79.4/km^{2} (206/sq mi)
- Time zone: UTC+01:00 (CET)
  - Summer (DST): UTC+02:00 (CEST)
- INSEE/Postal code: 65252 /65380
- ^{1} French Land Register data, which excludes lakes, ponds, glaciers > 1 km^{2} (0.386 sq mi or 247 acres) and river estuaries.

Lamarque-Pontacq (French pronunciation: [lamaʁk pɔ̃tak]; Occitan: Era Marca) is a commune in the Hautes-Pyrénées department in south-western France.

== See also ==
- Communes of the Hautes-Pyrénées department
