= Loucrup =

- Commune
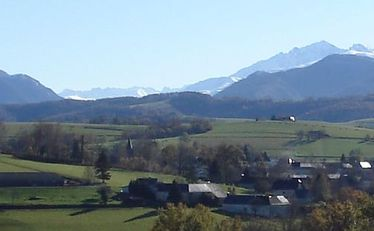
- The village of Loucrup

- Coat of arms
- Location of Loucrup
- Location within France Location within Occitanie
- Coordinates: 43°07′15″N 0°04′15″E
- Country: France
- Region: Occitania
- Department: Hautes-Pyrénées
- Arrondissement: Tarbes
- Canton: Ossun
- Intercommunality: CA Tarbes-Lourdes-Pyrénées

Government
  - Mayor (2020–2026): Jean-François Dron
- Area^{1}: 3.62 km^{2} (1.40 sq mi)
- Elevation: 542 m (1,778 ft)
- Highest elevation: 588 m (1,929 ft)
- Lowest elevation: 397 m (1,302 ft)
- Population (2023): 253
  - Density: 69.9/km^{2} (181/sq mi)
- Time zone: UTC+01:00 (CET)
  - Summer (DST): UTC+02:00 (CEST)
- INSEE/Postal code: 65281 /65200
- ^{1} French Land Register data, which excludes lakes, ponds, glaciers > 1 km^{2} (0.386 sq mi or 247 acres) and river estuaries.

Loucrup is a commune in the Hautes-Pyrénées department in south-western France.

== Sight and monuments ==
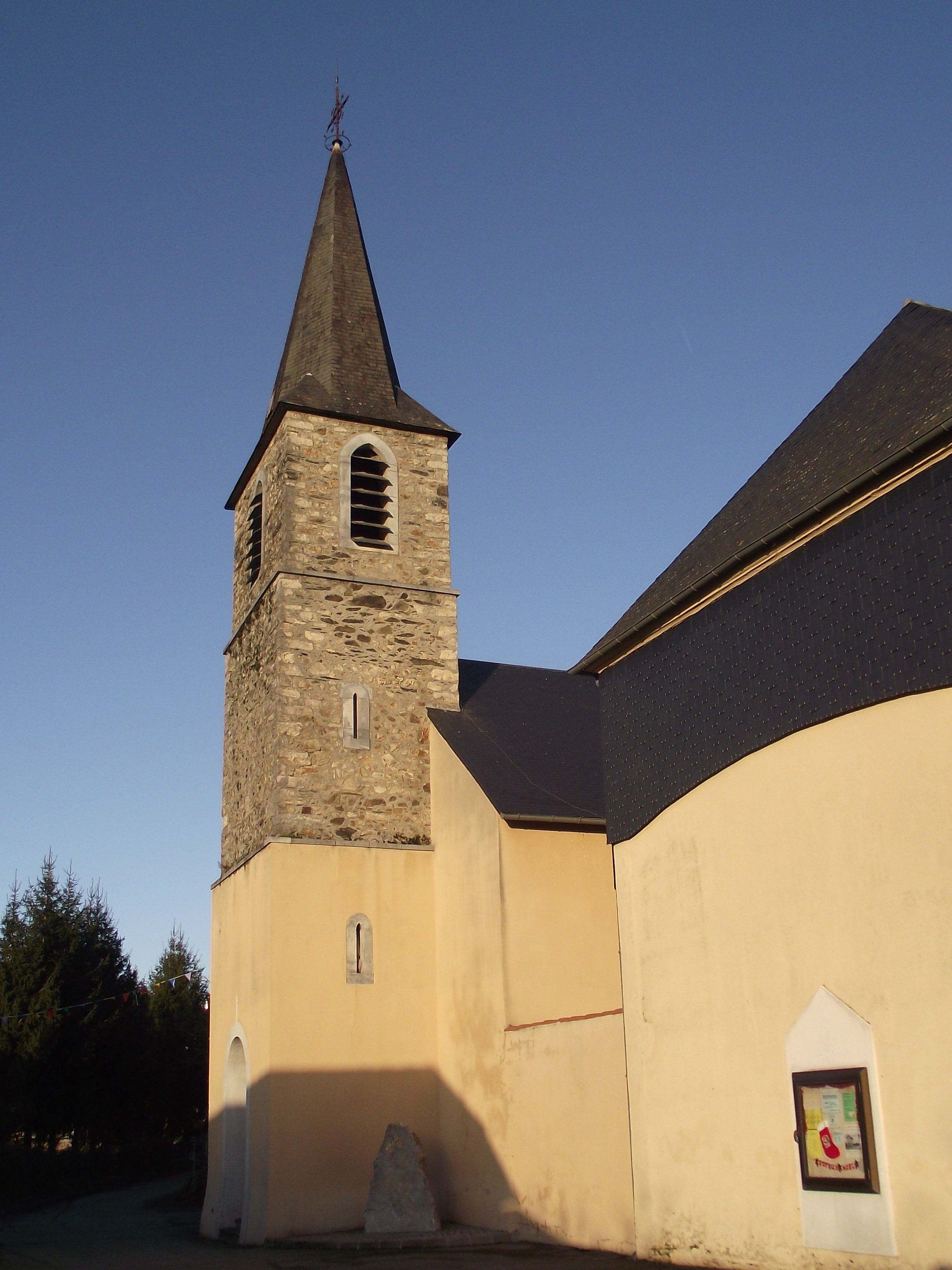
Saint-Martin Church

- Saint-Martin Church (19th century)
- Roman oppidum at the sources of the Aube on the Toulouse-Dax Roman road
- Medieval castle now disappeared that was on the road to Layrisse
- Former station on the Campan-Lourdes tramway line that operated from 1914 to 1932 (Tramway de la Bigorre)
- viewpoint over the Pyrénées
- Source of the Aube, a tributary of the Échez
- Tourist route between Bagnères-de-Bigorre and Lourdes

== Sport ==
Loucrup was passed through on the route of Stage 1 of the 2024 Tour Féminin des Pyrénées, 14 June.

== People linked to the commune ==
- Antoine Duffourc (born 1851 in Loucrup; died 1926 in Beaudéan) was a French historian. He wrote numerous works on the history of the Hautes-Pyrénées.

== See also ==
- Communes of the Hautes-Pyrénées department
