= Azereix =

- Commune
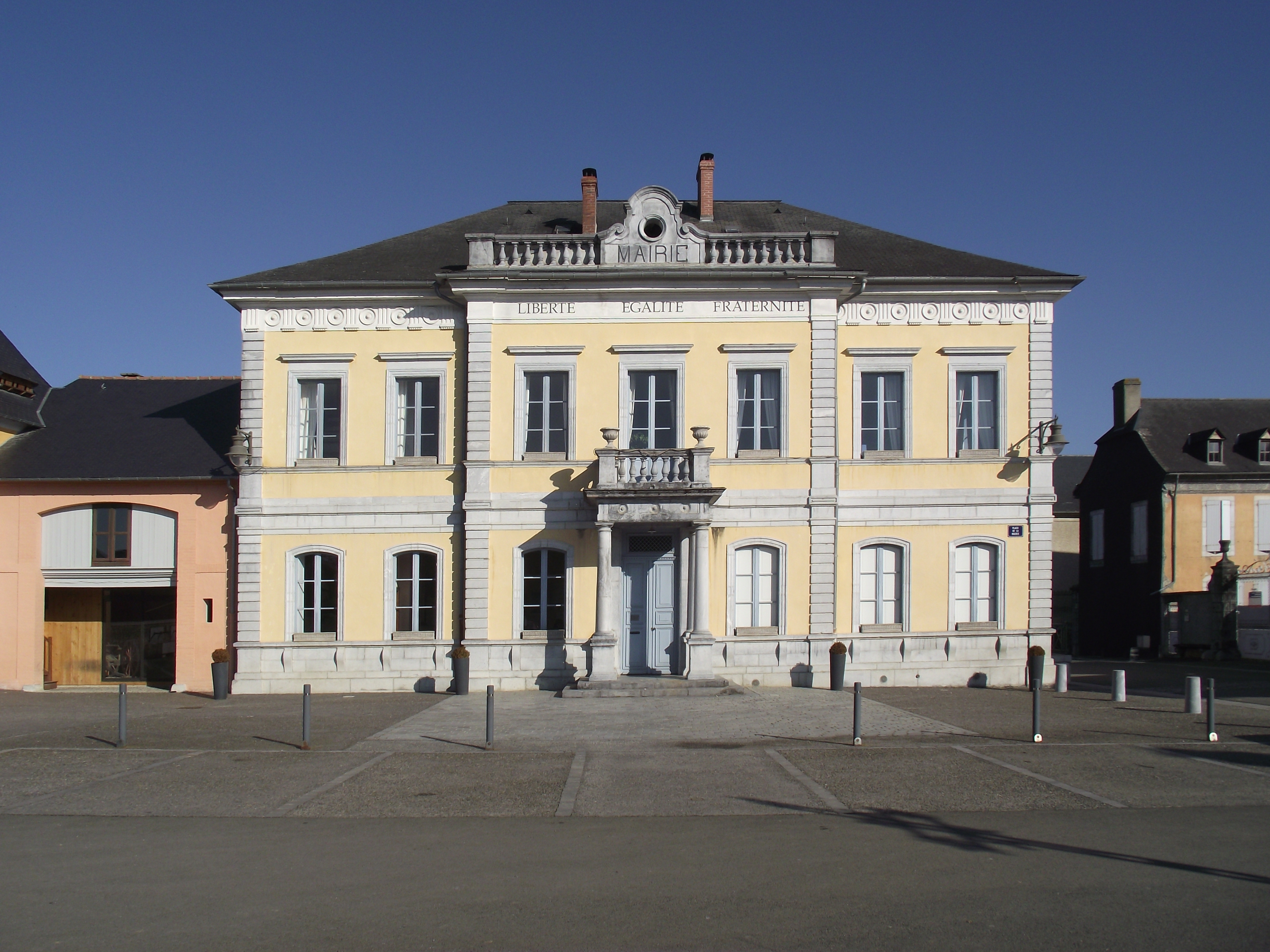
- The town hall

- Coat of arms
- Location of Azereix
- Location within France Location within Occitanie
- Coordinates: 43°12′33″N 0°00′23″W
- Country: France
- Region: Occitania
- Department: Hautes-Pyrénées
- Arrondissement: Tarbes
- Canton: Ossun
- Intercommunality: CA Tarbes-Lourdes-Pyrénées

Government
  - Mayor (2020–2026): Serge Cieutat
- Area^{1}: 15.2 km^{2} (5.9 sq mi)
- Elevation: 359 m (1,178 ft)
- Highest elevation: 463 m (1,519 ft)
- Lowest elevation: 325 m (1,066 ft)
- Population (2023): 992
  - Density: 65.3/km^{2} (169/sq mi)
- Time zone: UTC+01:00 (CET)
  - Summer (DST): UTC+02:00 (CEST)
- INSEE/Postal code: 65057 /65380
- ^{1} French Land Register data, which excludes lakes, ponds, glaciers > 1 km^{2} (0.386 sq mi or 247 acres) and river estuaries.

Azereix (French pronunciation: [azəʁɛks]; Occitan: Asereish) is a commune in the Hautes-Pyrénées department in southwestern France.

== Population ==
Historical population
| Year | Pop. | ±% p.a. |
|---|---|---|
| 1968 | 570 | — |
| 1975 | 672 | +2.38% |
| 1982 | 783 | +2.21% |
| 1990 | 911 | +1.91% |
| 1999 | 906 | −0.06% |
| 2007 | 950 | +0.59% |
| 2012 | 1,019 | +1.41% |
| 2017 | 986 | −0.66% |
| 2023 | 992 | +0.10% |
Source: INSEE

== See also ==
- Communes of the Hautes-Pyrénées department
