= Hibarette =

- Commune
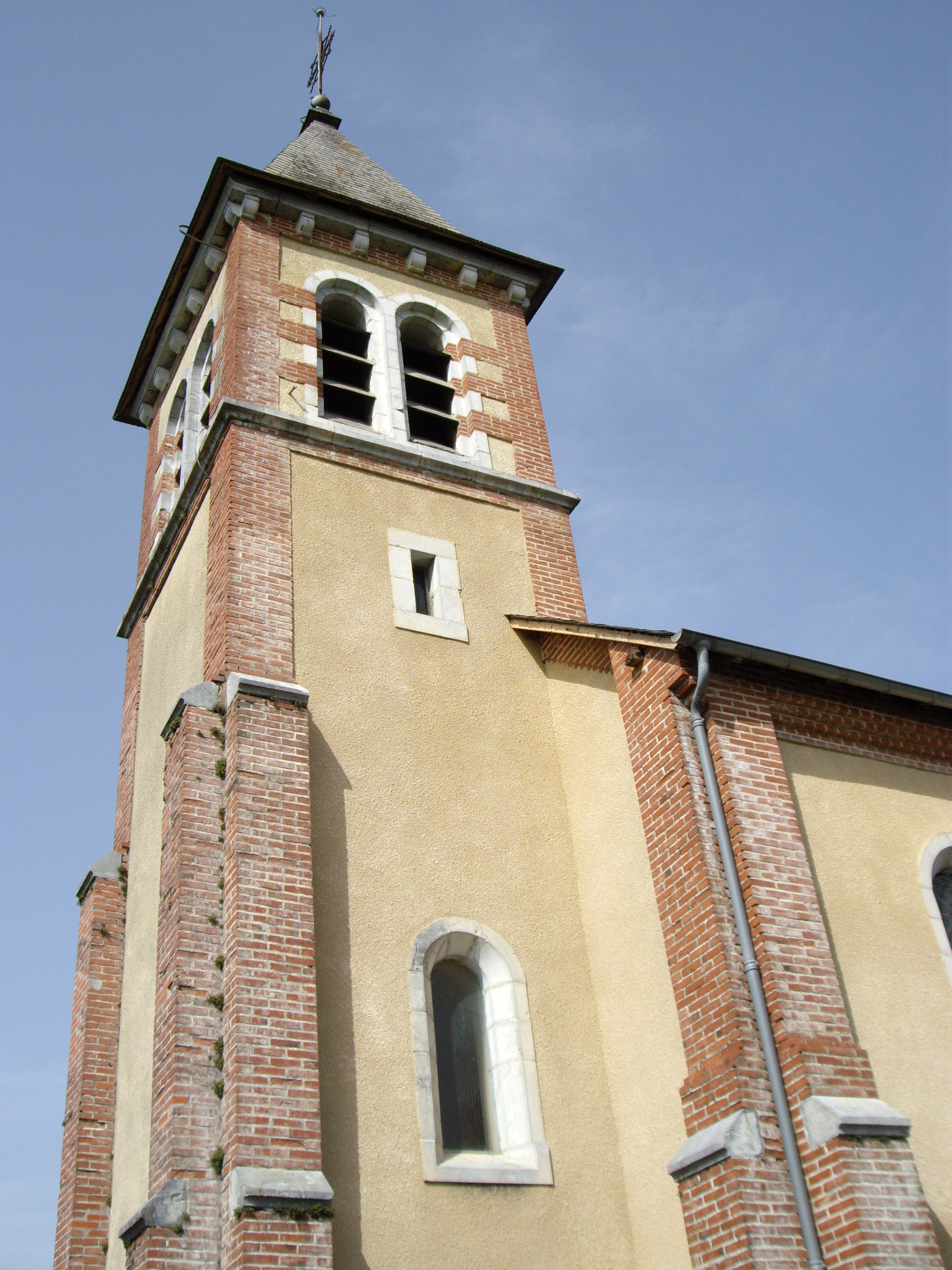
- The church of Saint-Etienne

- Coat of arms
- Location of Hibarette
- Location within France Location within Occitanie
- Coordinates: 43°09′56″N 0°02′07″E
- Country: France
- Region: Occitania
- Department: Hautes-Pyrénées
- Arrondissement: Tarbes
- Canton: Ossun
- Intercommunality: CA Tarbes-Lourdes-Pyrénées

Government
  - Mayor (2020–2026): Stéphane Noguez
- Area^{1}: 1.53 km^{2} (0.59 sq mi)
- Elevation: 225 m (738 ft)
- Highest elevation: 462 m (1,516 ft)
- Lowest elevation: 333 m (1,093 ft)
- Population (2023): 232
  - Density: 152/km^{2} (393/sq mi)
- Time zone: UTC+01:00 (CET)
  - Summer (DST): UTC+02:00 (CEST)
- INSEE/Postal code: 65220 /65380
- ^{1} French Land Register data, which excludes lakes, ponds, glaciers > 1 km^{2} (0.386 sq mi or 247 acres) and river estuaries.

Hibarette (French pronunciation: [ibaʁɛt]; Occitan: Hibarèta) is a commune in the Hautes-Pyrénées department in south-western France.

== See also ==
- Communes of the Hautes-Pyrénées department
