= Escaunets =

- Commune
- Coat of arms
- Location of Escaunets
- Location within France Location within Occitanie
- Coordinates: 43°20′48″N 0°04′37″W
- Country: France
- Region: Occitania
- Department: Hautes-Pyrénées
- Arrondissement: Tarbes
- Canton: Vic-en-Bigorre
- Intercommunality: Adour Madiran

Government
  - Mayor (2023–2026): Magali Charron
- Area^{1}: 6.24 km^{2} (2.41 sq mi)
- Elevation: 300 m (980 ft)
- Highest elevation: 363 m (1,191 ft)
- Lowest elevation: 274 m (899 ft)
- Population (2023): 117
  - Density: 18.7/km^{2} (48.6/sq mi)
- Time zone: UTC+01:00 (CET)
  - Summer (DST): UTC+02:00 (CEST)
- INSEE/Postal code: 65160 /65500
- ^{1} French Land Register data, which excludes lakes, ponds, glaciers > 1 km^{2} (0.386 sq mi or 247 acres) and river estuaries.

Escaunets is a commune in the Hautes-Pyrénées department in south-western France.

Together with Séron and Villenave-près-Béarn, the commune forms an enclave of Hautes-Pyrénées within the department of Pyrénées-Atlantiques. A neighbouring second enclave comprises the communes of Gardères and Luquet.

== See also ==
- Communes of the Hautes-Pyrénées department
