= Lanne, Hautes-Pyrénées =

Lanne
- Commune
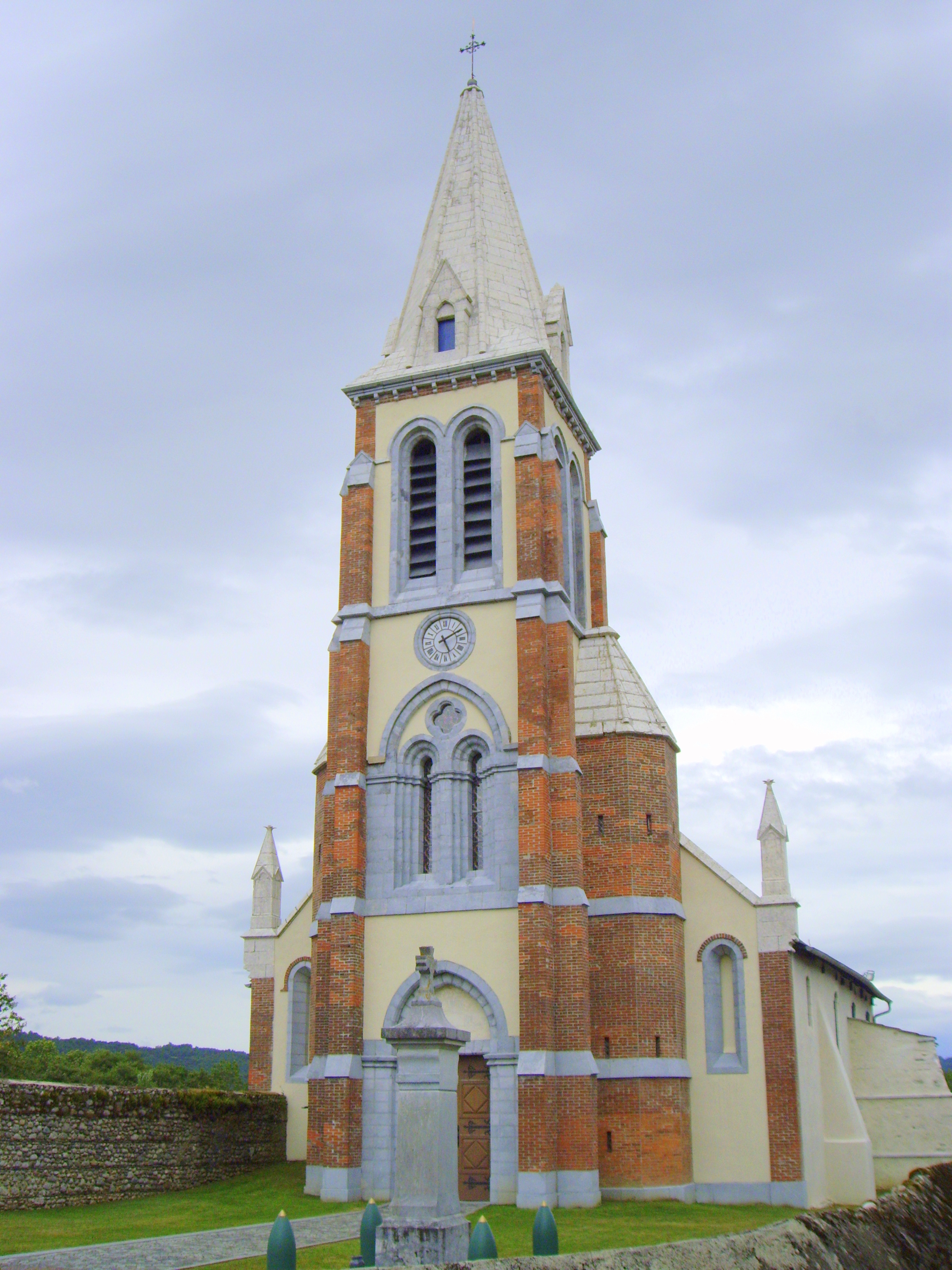
- The church of Saint-Blaise

- Coat of arms
- Location of Lanne
- Location within France Location within Occitanie
- Coordinates: 43°09′55″N 0°00′53″E
- Country: France
- Region: Occitania
- Department: Hautes-Pyrénées
- Arrondissement: Tarbes
- Canton: Ossun
- Intercommunality: CA Tarbes-Lourdes-Pyrénées

Government
  - Mayor (2020–2026): Alain Luquet
- Area^{1}: 5.75 km^{2} (2.22 sq mi)
- Elevation: 365 m (1,198 ft)
- Highest elevation: 454 m (1,490 ft)
- Lowest elevation: 346 m (1,135 ft)
- Population (2023): 598
  - Density: 104/km^{2} (269/sq mi)
- Time zone: UTC+01:00 (CET)
  - Summer (DST): UTC+02:00 (CEST)
- INSEE/Postal code: 65257 /65380
- ^{1} French Land Register data, which excludes lakes, ponds, glaciers > 1 km^{2} (0.386 sq mi or 247 acres) and river estuaries.

Lanne (French pronunciation: [lan]; Occitan: Lana) is a commune in the Hautes-Pyrénées department in south-western France.

== See also ==
- Communes of the Hautes-Pyrénées department
