= Ossun =

- Commune
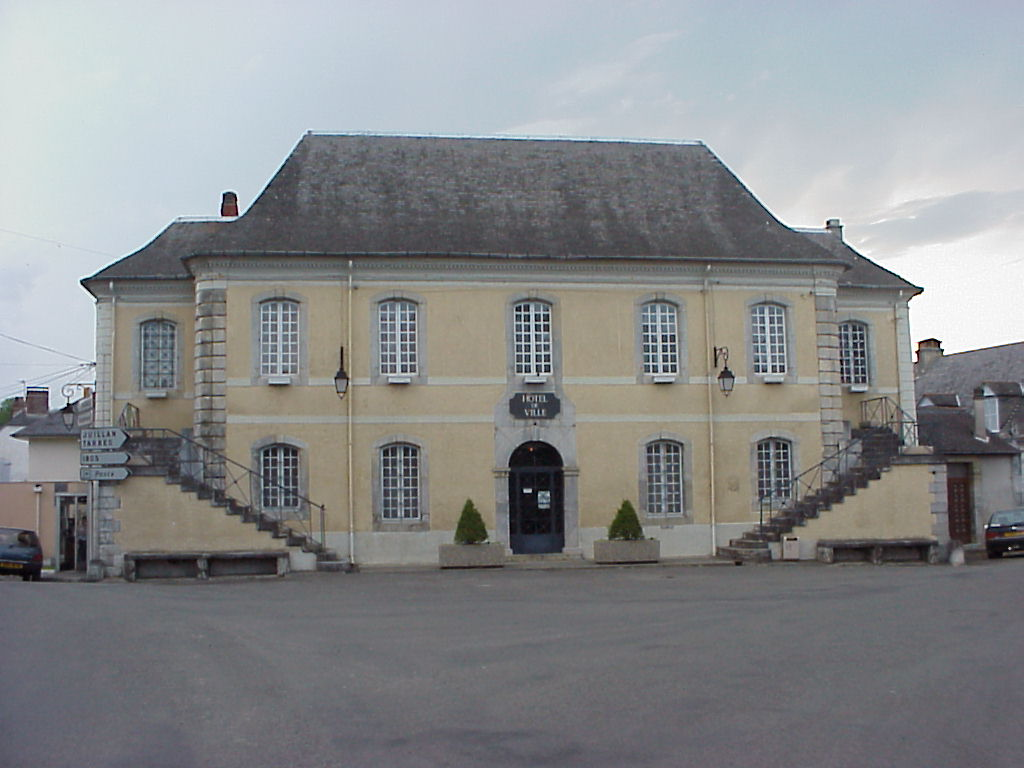
- Town hall of Ossun

- Coat of arms
- Location of Ossun
- Location within France Location within Occitanie
- Coordinates: 43°11′05″N 0°01′31″W
- Country: France
- Region: Occitania
- Department: Hautes-Pyrénées
- Arrondissement: Tarbes
- Canton: Ossun
- Intercommunality: CA Tarbes-Lourdes-Pyrénées

Government
  - Mayor (2020–2026): Francis Bordenave
- Area^{1}: 27.59 km^{2} (10.65 sq mi)
- Elevation: 366 m (1,201 ft)
- Highest elevation: 542 m (1,778 ft)
- Lowest elevation: 345 m (1,132 ft)
- Population (2023): 2,358
  - Density: 85.47/km^{2} (221.4/sq mi)
- Time zone: UTC+01:00 (CET)
  - Summer (DST): UTC+02:00 (CEST)
- INSEE/Postal code: 65344 /65380
- ^{1} French Land Register data, which excludes lakes, ponds, glaciers > 1 km^{2} (0.386 sq mi or 247 acres) and river estuaries.

Ossun (French pronunciation: [ɔsœ̃]; Occitan: Aussun) is a commune in the Hautes-Pyrénées department in south-western France. Ossun station has rail connections to Bayonne, Bordeaux, Tarbes and Pau.

== Population ==
Historical population
Year	Pop.	±% p.a.
1968	1,896	—
1975	1,837	−0.45%
1982	1,757	−0.63%
1990	2,083	+2.15%
1999	2,171	+0.46%
2007	2,263	+0.52%
2012	2,317	+0.47%
2017	2,368	+0.44%
2023	2,358	−0.07%
Source: INSEE

== See also ==
- Communes of the Hautes-Pyrénées department
