= Bénac, Hautes-Pyrénées =

Bénac
- Commune
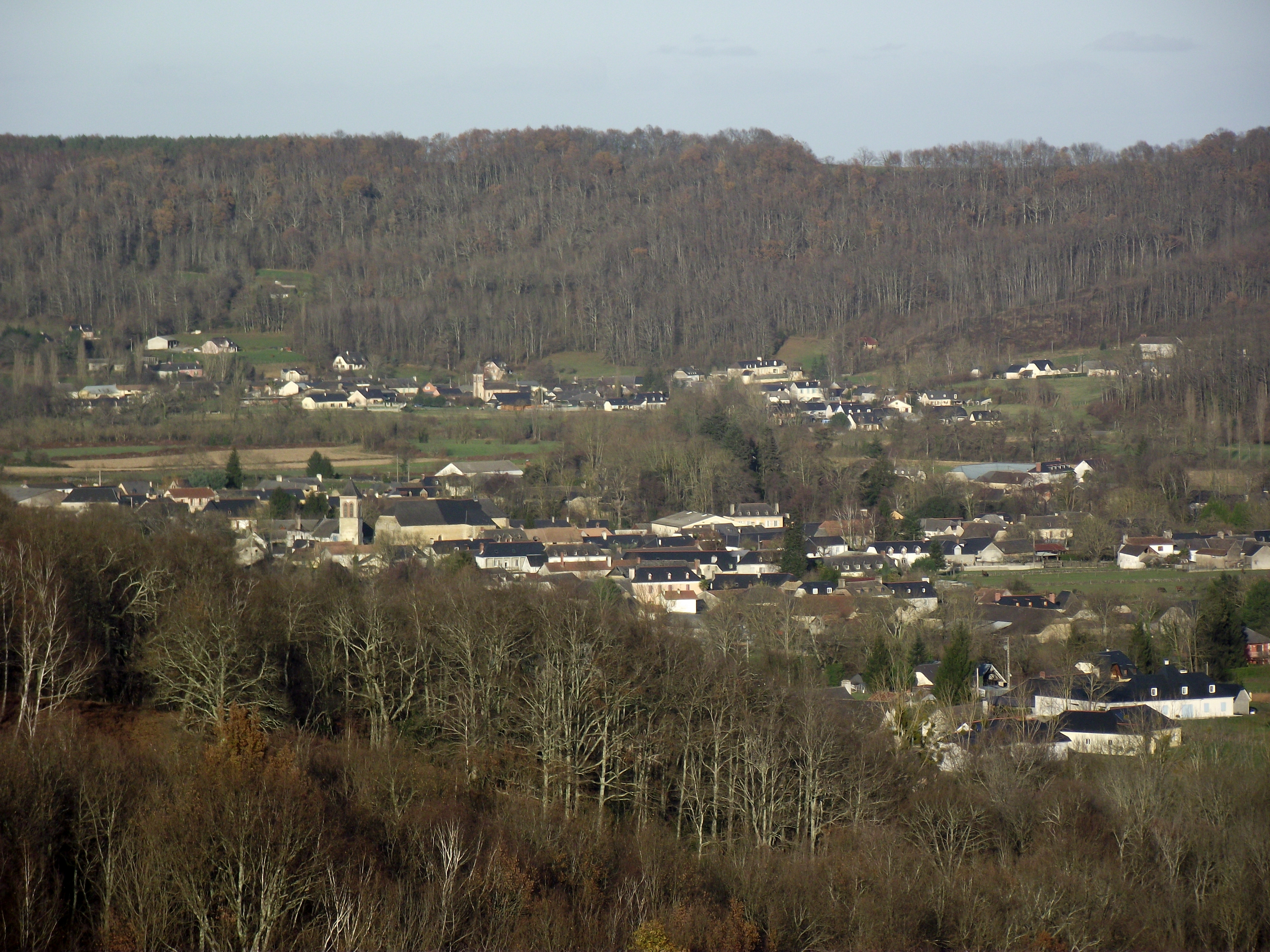
- The village seen from Averan

- Coat of arms
- Location of Bénac
- Location within France Location within Occitanie
- Coordinates: 43°09′15″N 0°01′37″E
- Country: France
- Region: Occitania
- Department: Hautes-Pyrénées
- Arrondissement: Tarbes
- Canton: Ossun
- Intercommunality: CA Tarbes-Lourdes-Pyrénées

Government
  - Mayor (2020–2026): Philippe Jouanolou
- Area^{1}: 7.93 km^{2} (3.06 sq mi)
- Elevation: 386 m (1,266 ft)
- Highest elevation: 491 m (1,611 ft)
- Lowest elevation: 341 m (1,119 ft)
- Population (2023): 528
  - Density: 66.6/km^{2} (172/sq mi)
- Time zone: UTC+01:00 (CET)
  - Summer (DST): UTC+02:00 (CEST)
- INSEE/Postal code: 65080 /65380
- ^{1} French Land Register data, which excludes lakes, ponds, glaciers > 1 km^{2} (0.386 sq mi or 247 acres) and river estuaries.

Bénac (French pronunciation: [benak]; Occitan: Benac) is a commune in the Hautes-Pyrénées department in southwestern France.

== Population ==
Historical population
Year	Pop.	±% p.a.
1968	406	—
1975	399	−0.25%
1982	436	+1.27%
1990	478	+1.16%
1999	473	−0.12%
2007	496	+0.60%
2012	512	+0.64%
2017	548	+1.37%
2023	528	−0.62%
Source: INSEE

== See also ==
- Communes of the Hautes-Pyrénées department
