= Sengouagnet =

- Commune
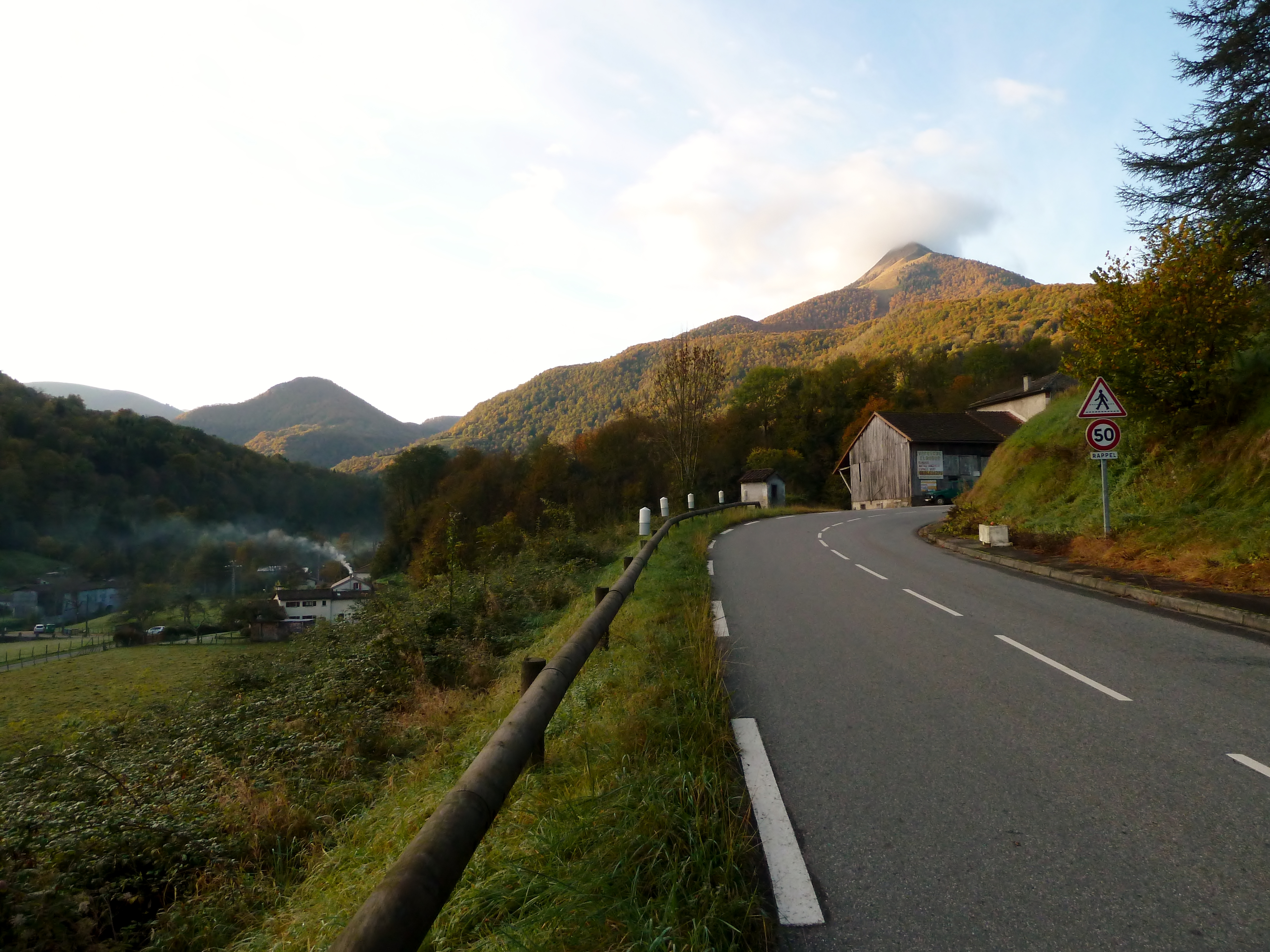
- The road into Sengouagnet
- Location of Sengouagnet
- Location within France Location within Occitanie
- Coordinates: 42°59′15″N 0°47′23″E
- Country: France
- Region: Occitania
- Department: Haute-Garonne
- Arrondissement: Saint-Gaudens
- Canton: Bagnères-de-Luchon

Government
  - Mayor (2020–2026): Sylvain Junqua
- Area^{1}: 18.60 km^{2} (7.18 sq mi)
- Elevation: 524 m (1,719 ft)
- Highest elevation: 1,908 m (6,260 ft)
- Lowest elevation: 467 m (1,532 ft)
- Population (2023): 228
  - Density: 12.3/km^{2} (31.7/sq mi)
- Time zone: UTC+01:00 (CET)
  - Summer (DST): UTC+02:00 (CEST)
- INSEE/Postal code: 31544 /31160
- ^{1} French Land Register data, which excludes lakes, ponds, glaciers > 1 km^{2} (0.386 sq mi or 247 acres) and river estuaries.

Sengouagnet is a commune in the Haute-Garonne department in southwestern France.

== Population ==
Historical population
Year	Pop.	±% p.a.
1968	223	—
1975	213	−0.65%
1982	215	+0.13%
1990	236	+1.17%
1999	220	−0.78%
2007	221	+0.06%
2012	216	−0.46%
2017	206	−0.94%
2023	228	+1.71%
Source: INSEE

== See also ==
- Communes of the Haute-Garonne department
