= Orincles =

- Commune
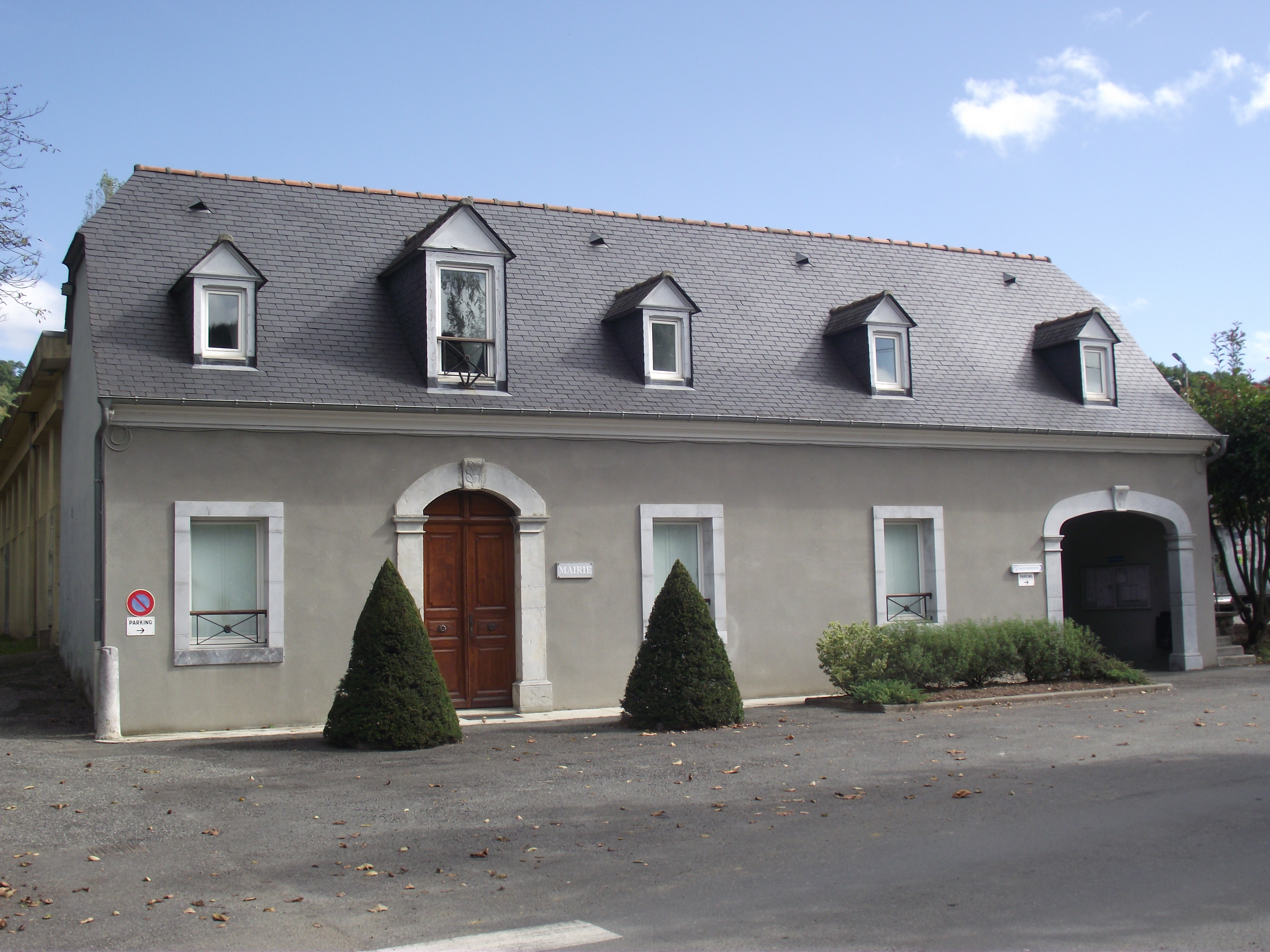
- Town hall

- Coat of arms
- Location of Orincles
- Location within France Location within Occitanie
- Coordinates: 43°07′44″N 0°02′25″E
- Country: France
- Region: Occitania
- Department: Hautes-Pyrénées
- Arrondissement: Tarbes
- Canton: Ossun
- Intercommunality: CA Tarbes-Lourdes-Pyrénées

Government
  - Mayor (2020–2026): Serge Duclos
- Area^{1}: 5.86 km^{2} (2.26 sq mi)
- Elevation: 342 m (1,122 ft)
- Highest elevation: 608 m (1,995 ft)
- Lowest elevation: 360 m (1,180 ft)
- Population (2023): 364
  - Density: 62.1/km^{2} (161/sq mi)
- Time zone: UTC+01:00 (CET)
  - Summer (DST): UTC+02:00 (CEST)
- INSEE/Postal code: 65339 /65380
- ^{1} French Land Register data, which excludes lakes, ponds, glaciers > 1 km^{2} (0.386 sq mi or 247 acres) and river estuaries.

Orincles (French pronunciation: [ɔʁɛ̃kl]; Occitan: Aurinclas) is a commune in the Hautes-Pyrénées department in south-western France.

== See also ==
- Communes of the Hautes-Pyrénées department
