= Valentine, Haute-Garonne =

Valentine
- Commune
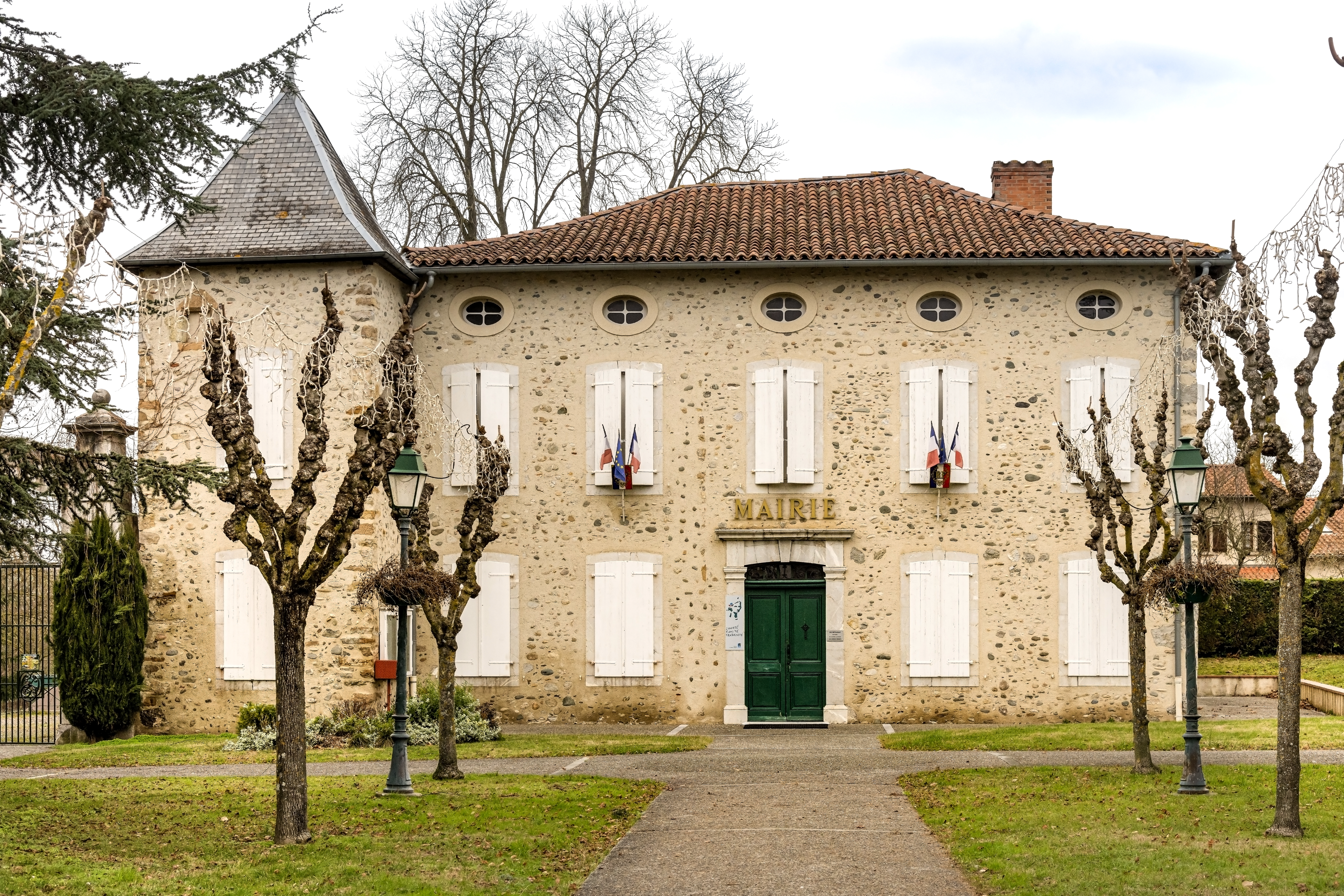
- Town hall

- Coat of arms
- Location of Valentine
- Location within France Location within Occitanie
- Coordinates: 43°05′46″N 0°42′20″E
- Country: France
- Region: Occitania
- Department: Haute-Garonne
- Arrondissement: Saint-Gaudens
- Canton: Saint-Gaudens

Government
  - Mayor (2020–2026): Marie Nadalet
- Area^{1}: 8.03 km^{2} (3.10 sq mi)
- Elevation: 371 m (1,217 ft)
- Highest elevation: 546 m (1,791 ft)
- Lowest elevation: 356 m (1,168 ft)
- Population (2023): 869
  - Density: 108/km^{2} (280/sq mi)
- Time zone: UTC+01:00 (CET)
  - Summer (DST): UTC+02:00 (CEST)
- INSEE/Postal code: 31565 /31800
- ^{1} French Land Register data, which excludes lakes, ponds, glaciers > 1 km^{2} (0.386 sq mi or 247 acres) and river estuaries.

Valentine (French pronunciation: [valɑ̃tin]; Occitan: Valentina) is a commune in the Haute-Garonne department in southwestern France.

== Population ==
Historical population
| Year | Pop. | ±% p.a. |
|---|---|---|
| 1968 | 1,155 | — |
| 1975 | 1,038 | −1.51% |
| 1982 | 1,002 | −0.50% |
| 1990 | 907 | −1.24% |
| 1999 | 894 | −0.16% |
| 2007 | 848 | −0.66% |
| 2012 | 910 | +1.42% |
| 2017 | 877 | −0.74% |
| 2023 | 869 | −0.15% |
Source: INSEE

== See also ==
- Communes of the Haute-Garonne department
