= La Force, Aude =

Commune in Occitanie, France

La Force
- Commune
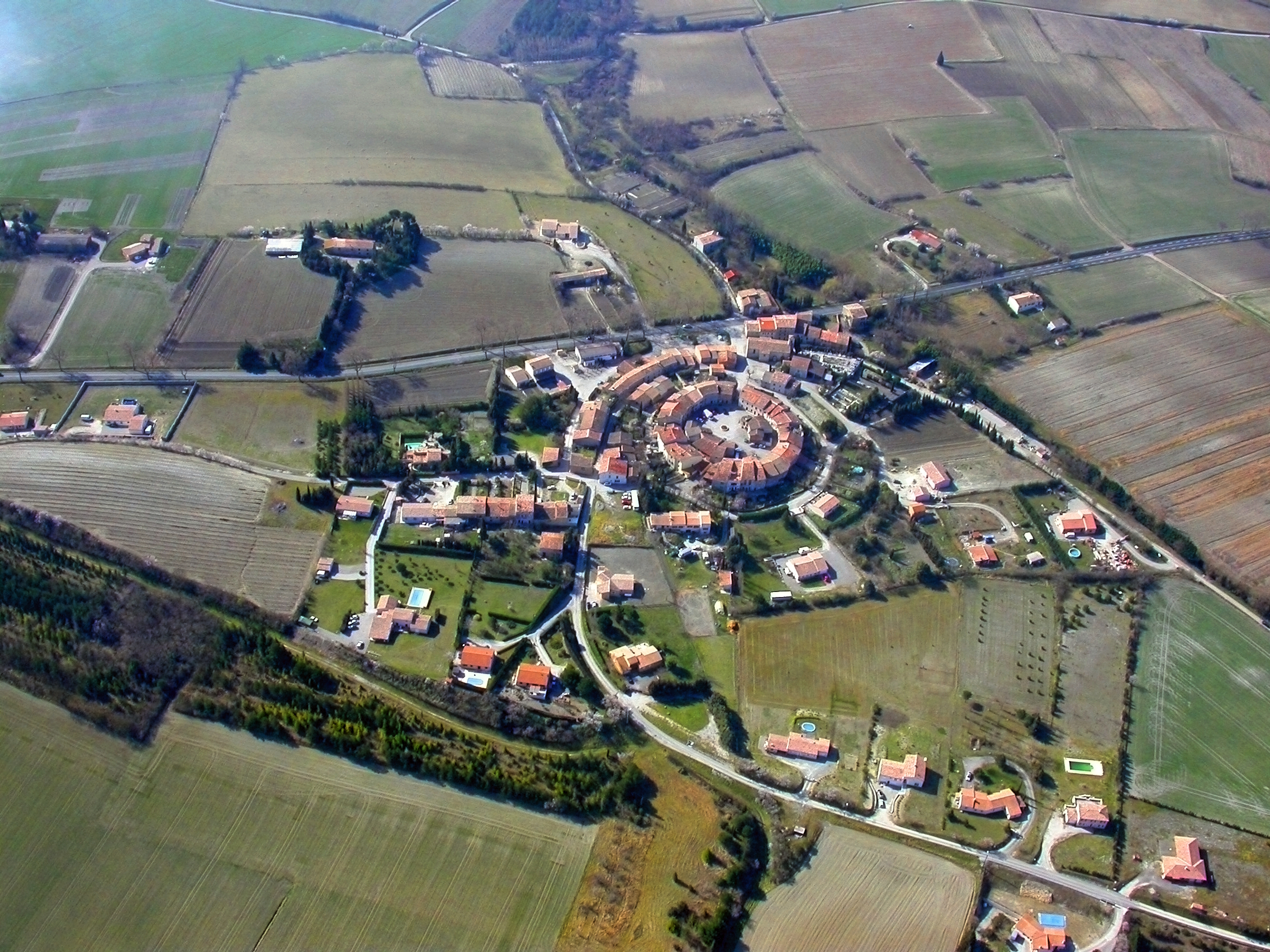
- An aerial view of La Force in 2010

- Coat of arms
- Location of La Force
- Location within France Location within Occitanie
- Coordinates: 43°11′41″N 2°05′40″E
- Country: France
- Region: Occitania
- Department: Aude
- Arrondissement: Carcassonne
- Canton: La Piège au Razès
- Intercommunality: Piège Lauragais Malepère

Government
  - Mayor (2020–2026): Jean Marc Estrem
- Area^{1}: 4.6 km^{2} (1.8 sq mi)
- Elevation: 80 m (260 ft)
- Highest elevation: 233 m (764 ft)
- Lowest elevation: 158 m (518 ft)
- Population (2023): 264
  - Density: 57/km^{2} (150/sq mi)
- Time zone: UTC+01:00 (CET)
  - Summer (DST): UTC+02:00 (CEST)
- INSEE/Postal code: 11153 /11270
- ^{1} French Land Register data, which excludes lakes, ponds, glaciers > 1 km^{2} (0.386 sq mi or 247 acres) and river estuaries.

La Force (French pronunciation: [la fɔʁs]; Occitan: La Fòrça) is a commune in the Aude department, southern France.

It is recognised as the smallest circulade or circular village in France.

The maire in 2020 is Jean Marc Albert Georges Estrem.

== Population ==
Historical population
Year	Pop.	±% p.a.
1968	154	—
1975	128	−2.61%
1982	129	+0.11%
1990	140	+1.03%
1999	187	+3.27%
2007	178	−0.61%
2012	206	+2.96%
2017	222	+1.51%
2023	264	+2.93%
Source: INSEE

== See also ==
- Communes of the Aude department
