= Averan =

- Commune
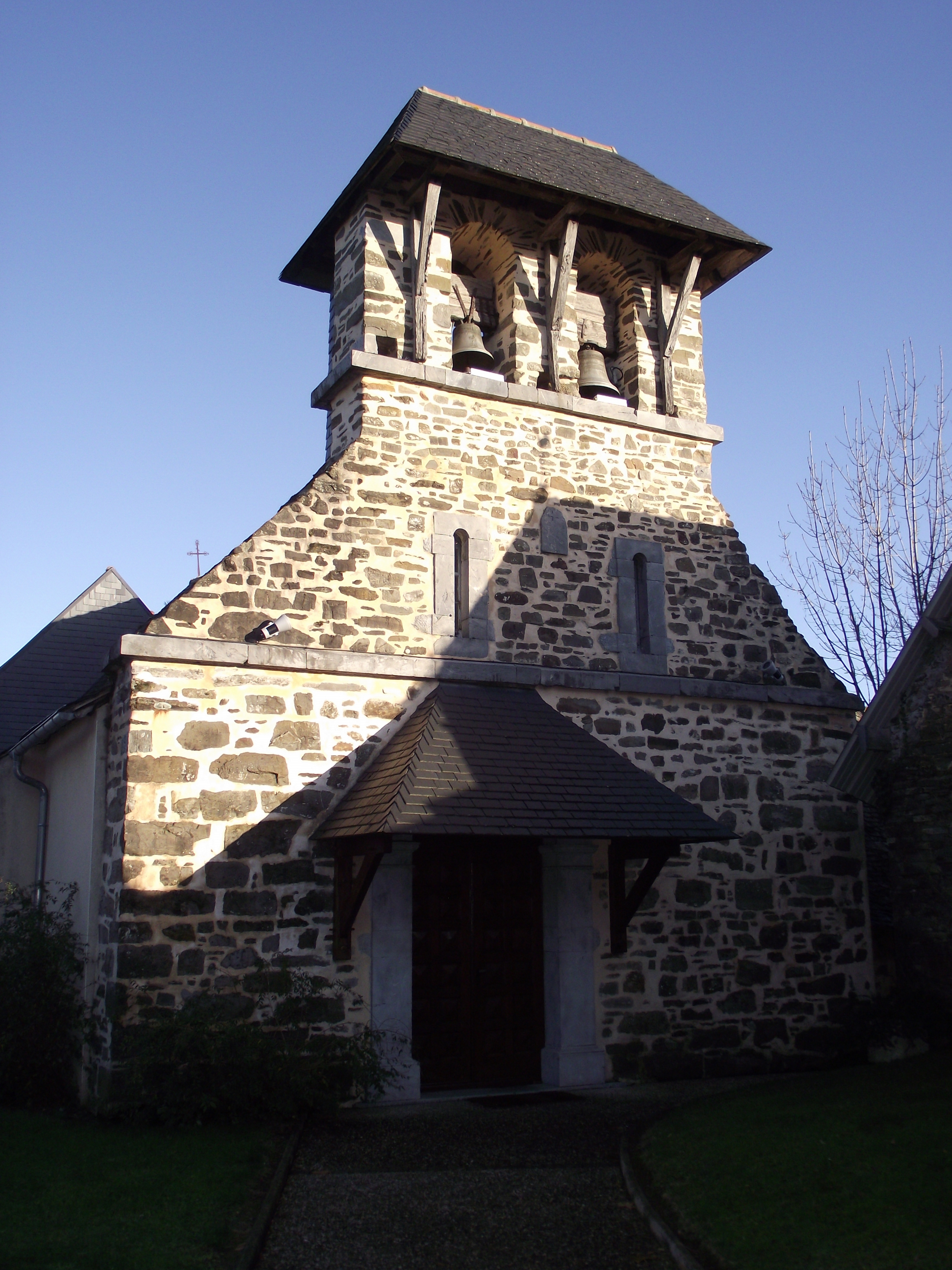
- The church of Saint-Martin

- Coat of arms
- Location of Averan
- Location within France Location within Occitanie
- Coordinates: 43°08′18″N 0°00′23″E
- Country: France
- Region: Occitania
- Department: Hautes-Pyrénées
- Arrondissement: Tarbes
- Canton: Ossun
- Intercommunality: CA Tarbes-Lourdes-Pyrénées

Government
  - Mayor (2020–2026): Daniel Darre
- Area^{1}: 4.35 km^{2} (1.68 sq mi)
- Elevation: 500 m (1,600 ft)
- Highest elevation: 623 m (2,044 ft)
- Lowest elevation: 390 m (1,280 ft)
- Population (2023): 86
  - Density: 20/km^{2} (51/sq mi)
- Time zone: UTC+01:00 (CET)
  - Summer (DST): UTC+02:00 (CEST)
- INSEE/Postal code: 65052 /65380
- ^{1} French Land Register data, which excludes lakes, ponds, glaciers > 1 km^{2} (0.386 sq mi or 247 acres) and river estuaries.

Averan (French pronunciation: [avʁɑ̃]; Occitan: Averan) is a commune in the Hautes-Pyrénées department in southwestern France.

== Population ==
Historical population
Year	Pop.	±% p.a.
1968	44	—
1975	50	+1.84%
1982	55	+1.37%
1990	49	−1.43%
1999	65	+3.19%
2007	67	+0.38%
2012	78	+3.09%
2017	68	−2.71%
2023	86	+3.99%
Source: INSEE

== See also ==
- Communes of the Hautes-Pyrénées department
