= Fronsac, Haute-Garonne =

Fronsac
- Commune
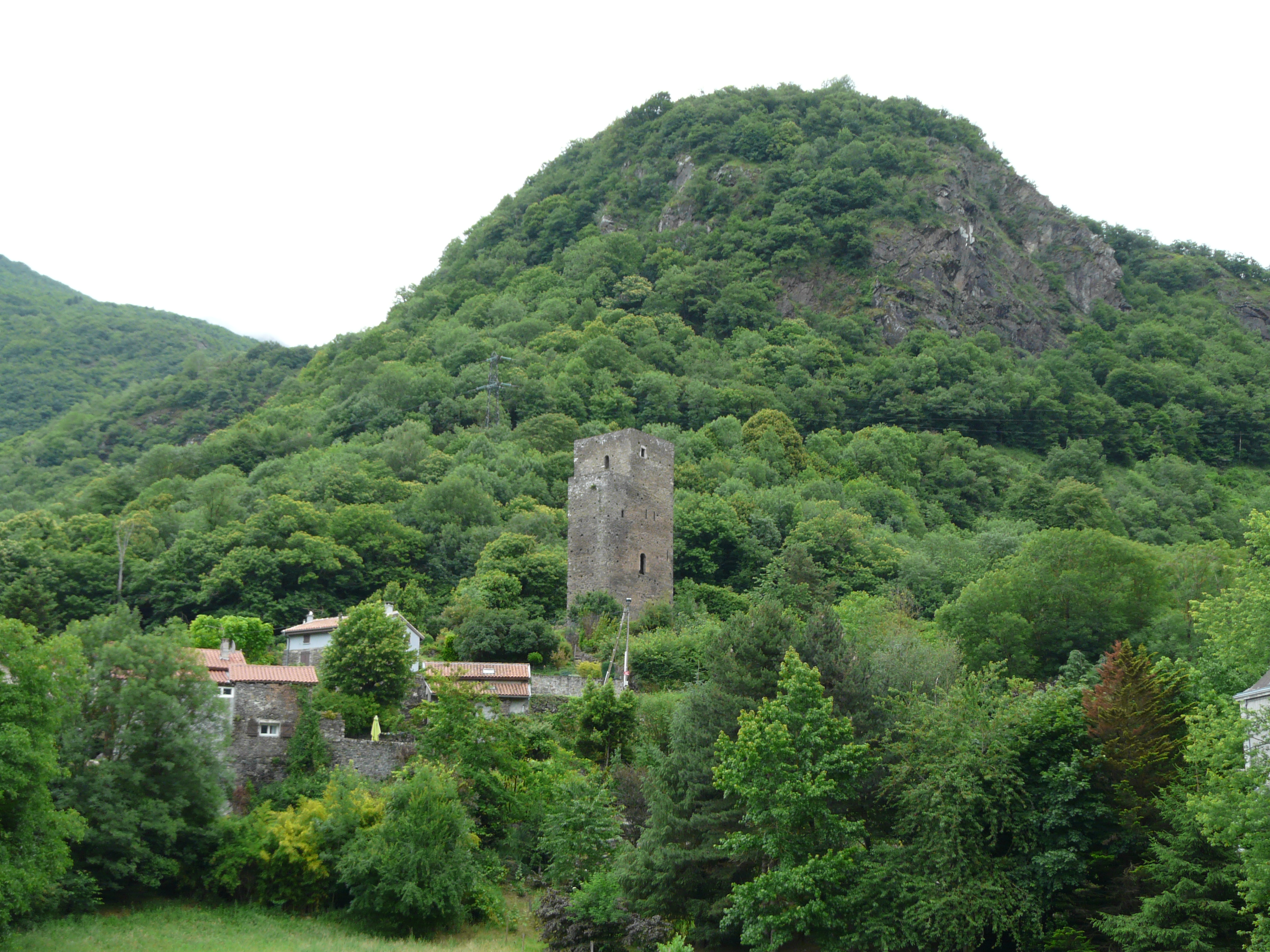
- The tower of the castle of the Counts of Comminges dominates the village of Fronsac
- Location of Fronsac
- Location within France Location within Occitanie
- Coordinates: 42°57′11″N 0°39′00″E
- Country: France
- Region: Occitania
- Department: Haute-Garonne
- Arrondissement: Saint-Gaudens
- Canton: Bagnères-de-Luchon
- Intercommunality: Pyrénées Haut Garonnaises

Government
  - Mayor (2020–2026): Michel Ladevèze
- Area^{1}: 4.15 km^{2} (1.60 sq mi)
- Elevation: 470 m (1,540 ft)
- Highest elevation: 1,680 m (5,510 ft)
- Lowest elevation: 461 m (1,512 ft)
- Population (2023): 185
  - Density: 44.6/km^{2} (115/sq mi)
- Time zone: UTC+01:00 (CET)
  - Summer (DST): UTC+02:00 (CEST)
- INSEE/Postal code: 31199 /31440
- ^{1} French Land Register data, which excludes lakes, ponds, glaciers > 1 km^{2} (0.386 sq mi or 247 acres) and river estuaries.

Fronsac (French pronunciation: [fʁɔ̃sak]) is a commune in the Haute-Garonne department in southwestern France.

It is situated on the former Route nationale 618, the "Route of the Pyrenees".

== Population ==
Historical population
| Year | Pop. | ±% p.a. |
|---|---|---|
| 1968 | 265 | — |
| 1975 | 243 | −1.23% |
| 1982 | 226 | −1.03% |
| 1990 | 201 | −1.45% |
| 1999 | 216 | +0.80% |
| 2007 | 210 | −0.35% |
| 2012 | 193 | −1.67% |
| 2017 | 210 | +1.70% |
| 2023 | 185 | −2.09% |
Source: INSEE

== See also ==
- Communes of the Haute-Garonne department
