= Juzet-d'Izaut =

- Commune
- Location of Juzet-d'Izaut
- Location within France Location within Occitanie
- Coordinates: 42°58′42″N 0°45′36″E
- Country: France
- Region: Occitania
- Department: Haute-Garonne
- Arrondissement: Saint-Gaudens
- Canton: Bagnères-de-Luchon

Government
  - Mayor (2020–2026): Dominique Ponticaccia
- Area^{1}: 15.74 km^{2} (6.08 sq mi)
- Elevation: 579 m (1,900 ft)
- Highest elevation: 1,908 m (6,260 ft)
- Lowest elevation: 466 m (1,529 ft)
- Population (2023): 177
  - Density: 11.2/km^{2} (29.1/sq mi)
- Time zone: UTC+01:00 (CET)
  - Summer (DST): UTC+02:00 (CEST)
- INSEE/Postal code: 31245 /31160
- ^{1} French Land Register data, which excludes lakes, ponds, glaciers > 1 km^{2} (0.386 sq mi or 247 acres) and river estuaries.

Juzet-d'Izaut (French pronunciation: [ʒyzɛ dizo], literally Juzet of Izaut; Occitan: Jusèth d'Aisaut) is a commune in the Haute-Garonne department in southwestern France.

It lies on the former Route nationale 618, the "Route of the Pyrenees".

== Population ==
Historical population
Year	Pop.	±% p.a.
1968	222	—
1975	248	+1.59%
1982	229	−1.13%
1990	202	−1.56%
1999	193	−0.51%
2007	202	+0.57%
2012	203	+0.10%
2017	188	−1.52%
2023	177	−1.00%
Source: INSEE

== See also ==
Communes of the Haute-Garonne department
