= Cazaunous =

- Commune
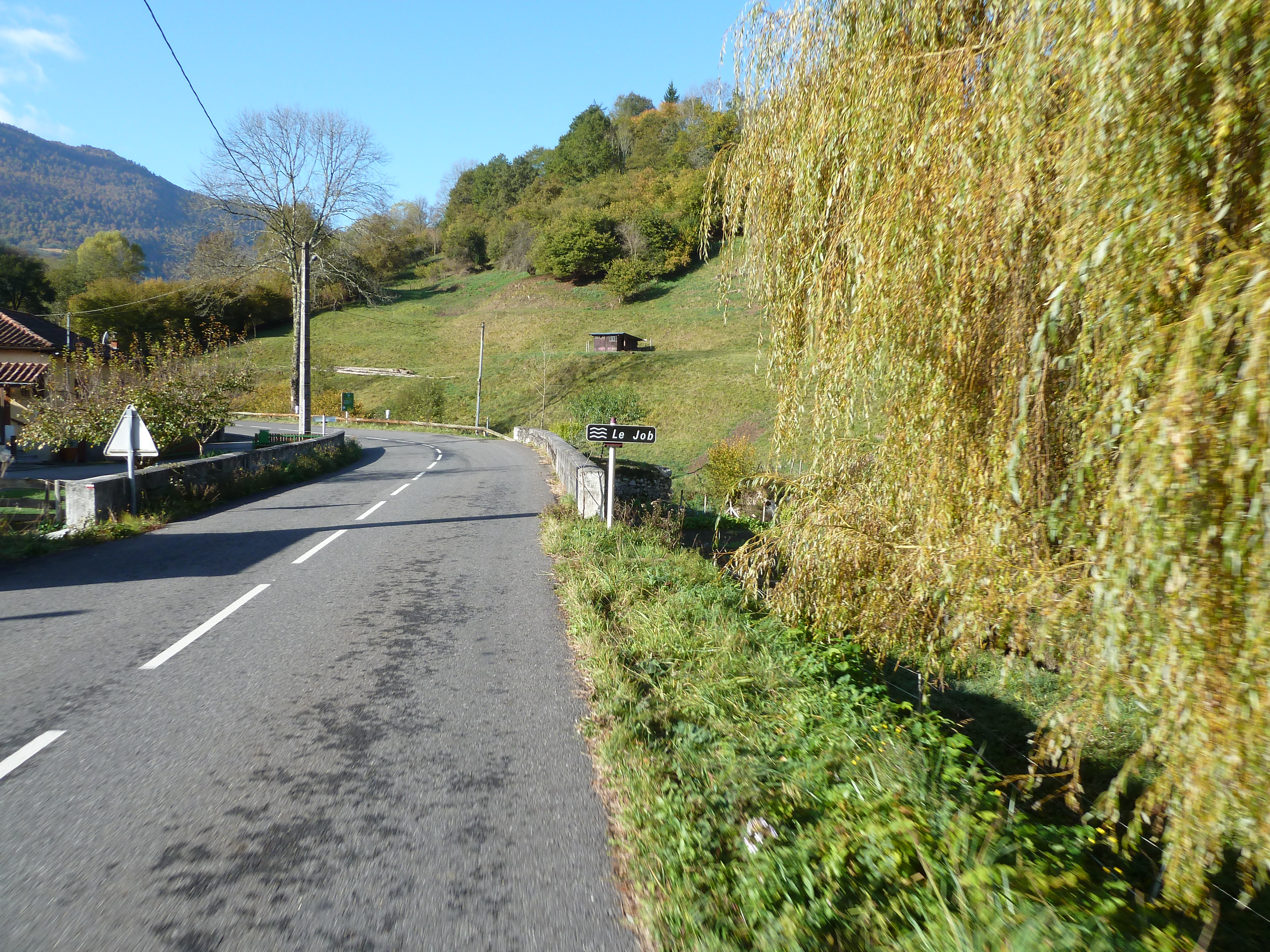
- The Job river in Cazaunous
- Location of Cazaunous
- Location within France Location within Occitanie
- Coordinates: 42°59′12″N 0°44′05″E
- Country: France
- Region: Occitania
- Department: Haute-Garonne
- Arrondissement: Saint-Gaudens
- Canton: Bagnères-de-Luchon

Government
  - Mayor (2020–2026): Jean-Benoit Abadie
- Area^{1}: 4.66 km^{2} (1.80 sq mi)
- Elevation: 561 m (1,841 ft)
- Highest elevation: 920 m (3,020 ft)
- Lowest elevation: 474 m (1,555 ft)
- Population (2023): 64
  - Density: 14/km^{2} (36/sq mi)
- Time zone: UTC+01:00 (CET)
  - Summer (DST): UTC+02:00 (CEST)
- INSEE/Postal code: 31131 /31160
- ^{1} French Land Register data, which excludes lakes, ponds, glaciers > 1 km^{2} (0.386 sq mi or 247 acres) and river estuaries.

Cazaunous is a commune in the Haute-Garonne department in southwestern France.

It is situated on the former Route nationale 618, the "Route of the Pyrenees".

== Population ==
Historical population
Year	Pop.	±% p.a.
1968	58	—
1975	42	−4.51%
1982	46	+1.31%
1990	47	+0.27%
1999	47	+0.00%
2007	67	+4.53%
2012	61	−1.86%
2017	72	+3.37%
2023	64	−1.94%
Source: INSEE

== See also ==
- Communes of the Haute-Garonne department
