= 2016 Tour de France, Stage 1 to Stage 11 =

Cycling race stages

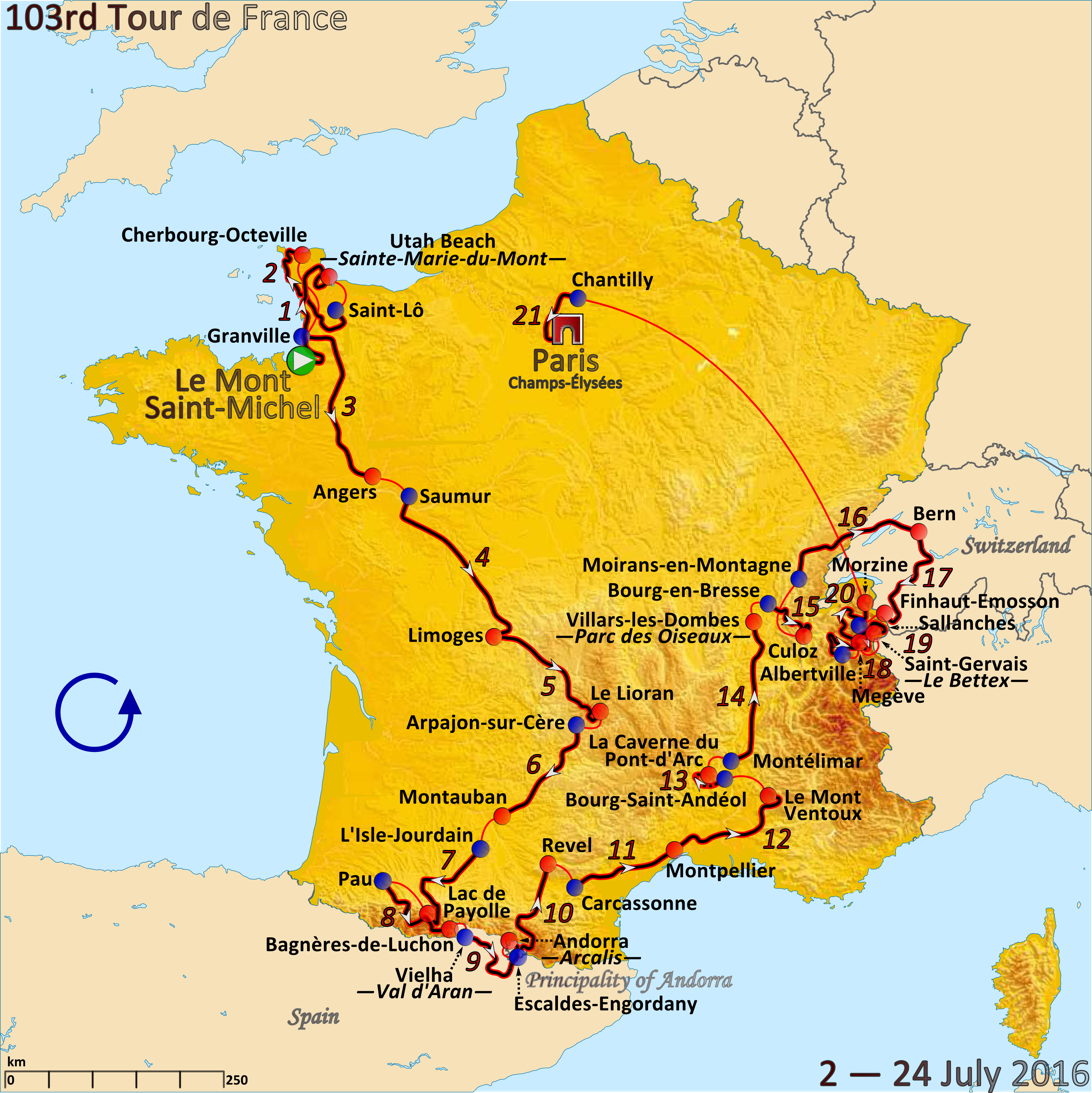
Route of the 2016 Tour de France

The 2016 Tour de France is the 103rd edition of the cycle race, one of cycling's Grand Tours. On 24 November 2014 Amaury Sport Organisation announced that the race would depart, on 2 July 2016, from the French department of Manche, for the first time in the history of the Tour de France. The race is also scheduled to have a stage finish in Andorra. The race will finish on the Champs-Élysées in Paris on 24 July.

== Classification standings ==
Legend
Yellow jersey	Denotes the leader of the general classification	Green jersey	Denotes the leader of the points classification
Polka dot jersey	Denotes the leader of the mountains classification	White jersey	Denotes the leader of the young rider classification
Jersey with a yellow background on the number bib.	Denotes the leader of the team classification		

== Stage 1 ==
2 July 2016 — Mont Saint-Michel to Utah Beach, Sainte-Marie-du-Mont, 188 km (117 mi)

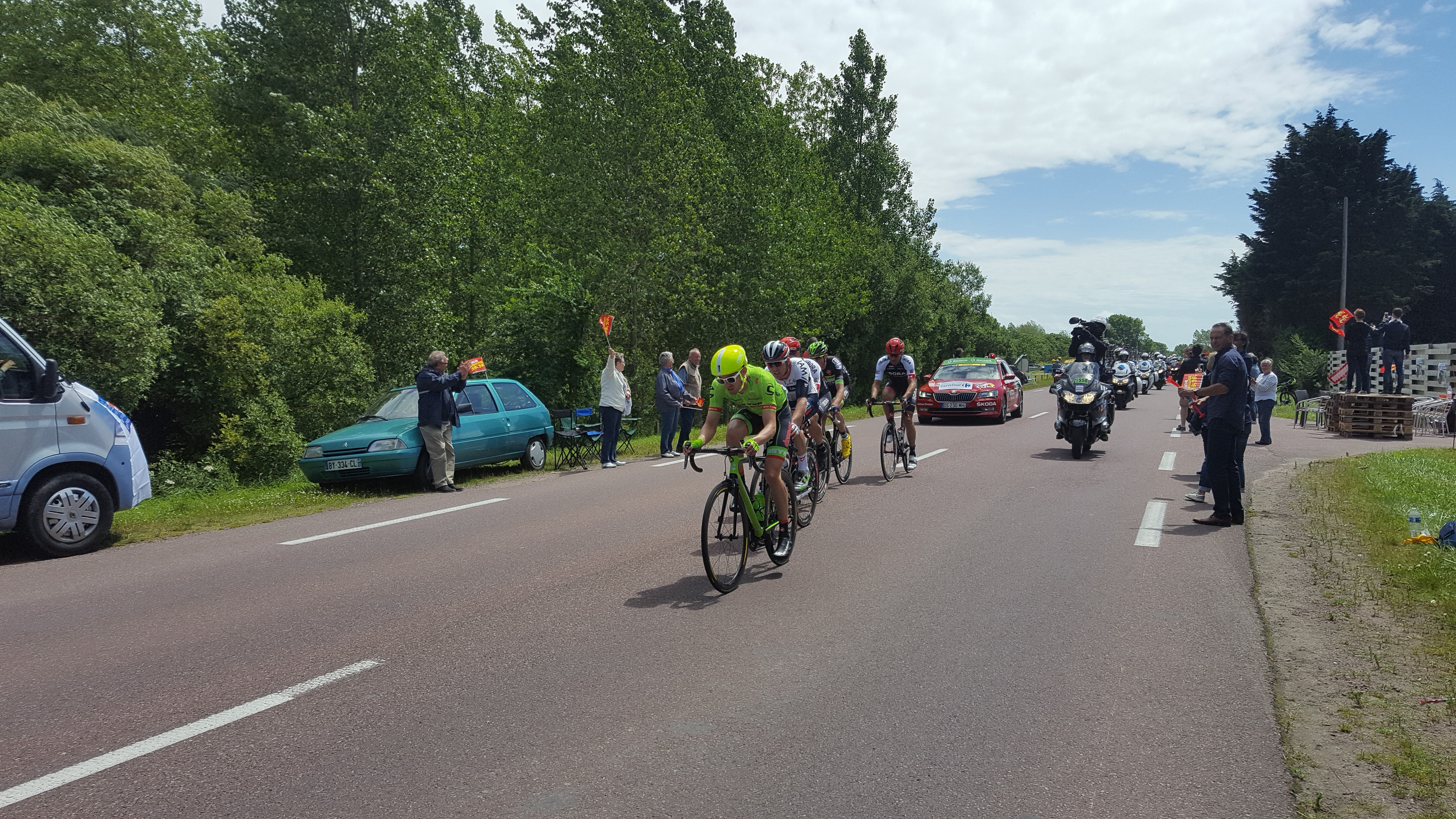
The early breakaway group at Gouville on stage 1

This flat stage departed east from Mont Saint-Michel and headed north, following the western coastline of the Cotentin Peninsula, with the Category 4 climbs of the Côte d'Avranches at 98 metres (322 ft) and the Côte des falaises de Champeaux at 81 metres (266 ft) early on. The riders then passed through Granville, Montmartin-sur-Mer, Gouville-sur-Mer and Lessay. On moving inland to cross the peninsula, an intermediate sprint took place at La Haye. The race then continued through Saint-Sauveur-le-Vicomte, turning north-east to Montebourg, and over to the opposite coast at Quinéville. The riders then travelled south-east along the coast and turned inland south-west to Sainte-Mère-Église, before heading east to the finish line at Utah Beach. The stage ended with a sprint finish won by Mark Cavendish.

Stage 1 result

Rank	Rider	Team	Time
1	Mark Cavendish (GBR)	Team Dimension Data	4h 14' 05"
2	Marcel Kittel (GER)	Etixx–Quick-Step	s.t.
3	Peter Sagan (SVK)	Tinkoff	s.t.
4	André Greipel (GER)	Lotto–Soudal	s.t.
5	Edward Theuns (BEL)	Trek–Segafredo	s.t.
6	Christophe Laporte (FRA)	Cofidis	s.t.
7	Bryan Coquard (FRA)	Direct Énergie	s.t.
8	Alexander Kristoff (NOR)	Team Katusha	s.t.
9	Daniel McLay (GBR)	Fortuneo–Vital Concept	s.t.
10	Greg Henderson (NZL)	Lotto–Soudal	s.t.

General classification after stage 1

Rank	Rider	Team	Time
1	Mark Cavendish (GBR)	Team Dimension Data	4h 13' 55"
2	Marcel Kittel (GER)	Etixx–Quick-Step	+ 4"
3	Peter Sagan (SVK)	Tinkoff	+ 6"
4	André Greipel (GER)	Lotto–Soudal	+ 10"
5	Edward Theuns (BEL)	Trek–Segafredo	+ 10"
6	Christophe Laporte (FRA)	Cofidis	+ 10"
7	Bryan Coquard (FRA)	Direct Énergie	+ 10"
8	Alexander Kristoff (NOR)	Team Katusha	+ 10"
9	Daniel McLay (GBR)	Fortuneo–Vital Concept	+ 10"
10	Greg Henderson (NZL)	Lotto–Soudal	+ 10"

== Stage 2 ==
3 July 2016 — Saint-Lô to Cherbourg-en-Cotentin, 183 km (114 mi)

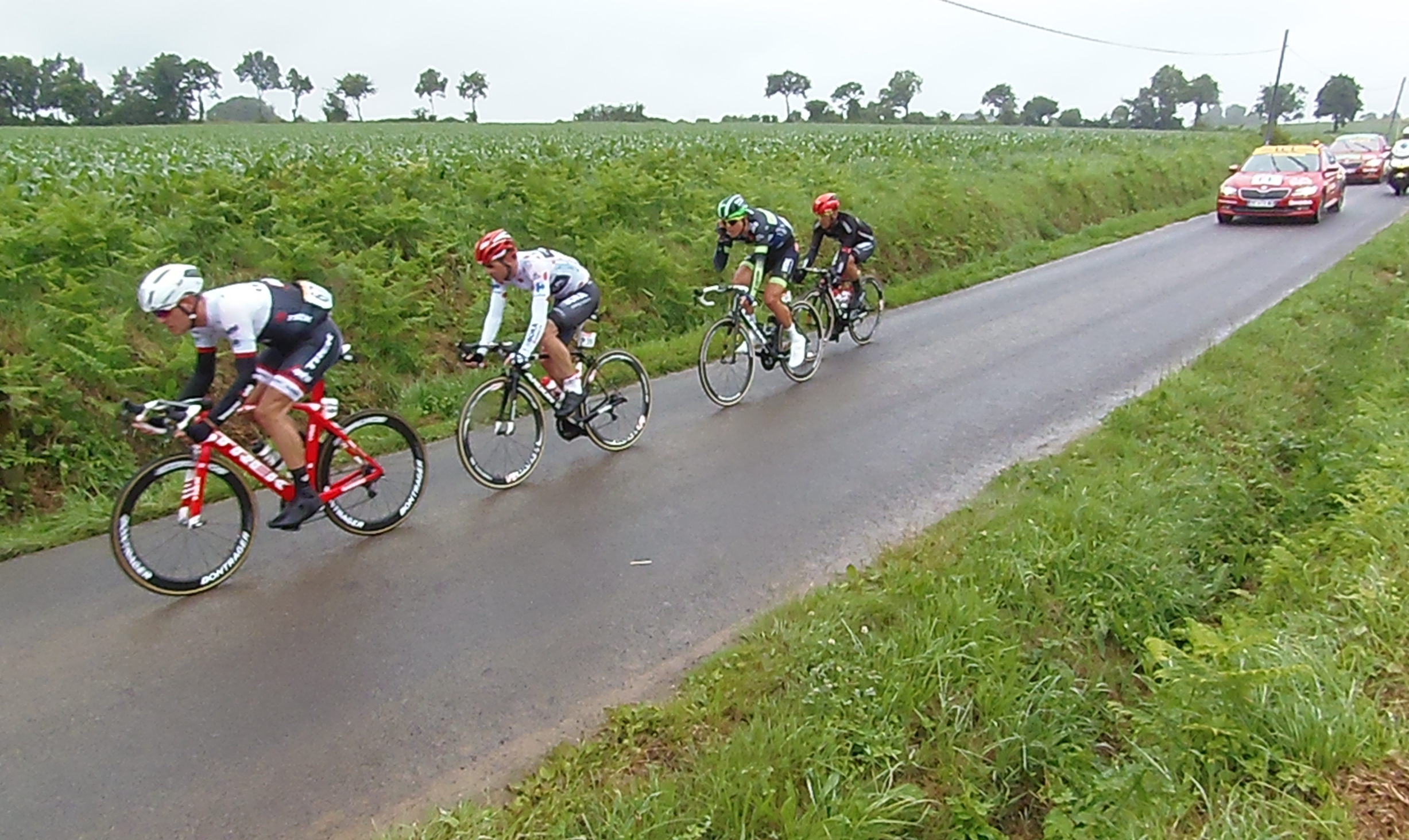
The early breakaway group at Percy, on stage 2

This hilly stage departed south-east from Saint-Lô to the Category 4 climb of the Côte de Torigny-les-Villes, then heading south-west to the Category 4 climb of the Côte de Montabot. The riders passed through Percy-en-Normandie and Hambye, reaching the Category 4 climb of the Côte de Montpinchon. The race then travelled north-west through Coutances, Montsurvent and Lessay. On reaching the coast at Bretteville-sur-Ay the race followed the coastline to an intermediate sprint at Portbail. The route then continued north through Barneville-Carteret, Les Pieux and Helleville to Sainte-Croix-Hague and turned west. The Category 3 Côte de La Glacerie at 133 metres (436 ft), a 1.9 kilometres (1.2 mi) climb at 6.5%, occurred on the way to the uphill finish at Cherbourg. Peter Sagan won the stage and took the lead of the race.

Stage 2 result

Rank	Rider	Team	Time
1	Peter Sagan (SVK)	Tinkoff	4h 20' 51"
2	Julian Alaphilippe (FRA)	Etixx–Quick-Step	s.t.
3	Alejandro Valverde (ESP)	Movistar Team	s.t.
4	Dan Martin (IRL)	Etixx–Quick-Step	s.t.
5	Michael Matthews (AUS)	Orica–BikeExchange	s.t.
6	Wilco Kelderman (NED)	LottoNL–Jumbo	s.t.
7	Tony Gallopin (FRA)	Lotto–Soudal	s.t.
8	Greg Van Avermaet (BEL)	BMC Racing Team	s.t.
9	Bauke Mollema (NED)	Trek–Segafredo	s.t.
10	Chris Froome (GBR)	Team Sky	s.t.

General classification after stage 2

Rank	Rider	Team	Time
1	Peter Sagan (SVK)	Tinkoff	8h 34' 42"
2	Julian Alaphilippe (FRA)	Etixx–Quick-Step	+ 8"
3	Alejandro Valverde (ESP)	Movistar Team	+ 10"
4	Warren Barguil (FRA)	Team Giant–Alpecin	+ 14"
5	Chris Froome (GBR)	Team Sky	+ 14"
6	Greg Van Avermaet (BEL)	BMC Racing Team	+ 14"
7	Nairo Quintana (COL)	Movistar Team	+ 14"
8	Roman Kreuziger (CZE)	Tinkoff	+ 14"
9	Simon Gerrans (AUS)	Orica–BikeExchange	+ 14"
10	Dan Martin (IRL)	Etixx–Quick-Step	+ 14"

== Stage 3 ==
4 July 2016 — Granville to Angers, 223.5 km (139 mi)

This long and flat stage departed east from Granville to the Category 4 climb of the Côte de Villedieu-les-Poêles. The route then wound south through Brécey, Saint-Hilaire-du-Harcouët, Fougères, Gennes-sur-Seiche and Renazé, and turned south-east to an intermediate sprint at Bouillé-Ménard. The riders then continued through Segré, La Pouëze and La Meignanne to the finish at Angers. The sprint finish was won by Mark Cavendish.

Stage 3 result

Rank	Rider	Team	Time
1	Mark Cavendish (GBR)	Team Dimension Data	5h 59' 54"
2	André Greipel (GER)	Lotto–Soudal	s.t.
3	Bryan Coquard (FRA)	Direct Énergie	s.t.
4	Peter Sagan (SVK)	Tinkoff	s.t.
5	Edward Theuns (BEL)	Trek–Segafredo	s.t.
6	Sondre Holst Enger (NOR)	IAM Cycling	s.t.
7	Marcel Kittel (GER)	Etixx–Quick-Step	s.t.
8	Christophe Laporte (FRA)	Cofidis	s.t.
9	Daniel McLay (GBR)	Fortuneo–Vital Concept	s.t.
10	Dylan Groenewegen (NED)	LottoNL–Jumbo	s.t.

General classification after stage 3

Rank	Rider	Team	Time
1	Peter Sagan (SVK)	Tinkoff	14h 34' 36"
2	Julian Alaphilippe (FRA)	Etixx–Quick-Step	+ 8"
3	Alejandro Valverde (ESP)	Movistar Team	+ 10"
4	Chris Froome (GBR)	Team Sky	+ 14"
5	Warren Barguil (FRA)	Team Giant–Alpecin	+ 14"
6	Nairo Quintana (COL)	Movistar Team	+ 14"
7	Roman Kreuziger (CZE)	Tinkoff	+ 14"
8	Tony Gallopin (FRA)	Lotto–Soudal	+ 14"
9	Fabio Aru (ITA)	Astana	+ 14"
10	Dan Martin (IRL)	Etixx–Quick-Step	+ 14"

== Stage 4 ==
5 July 2016 — Saumur to Limoges, 237.5 km (148 mi)

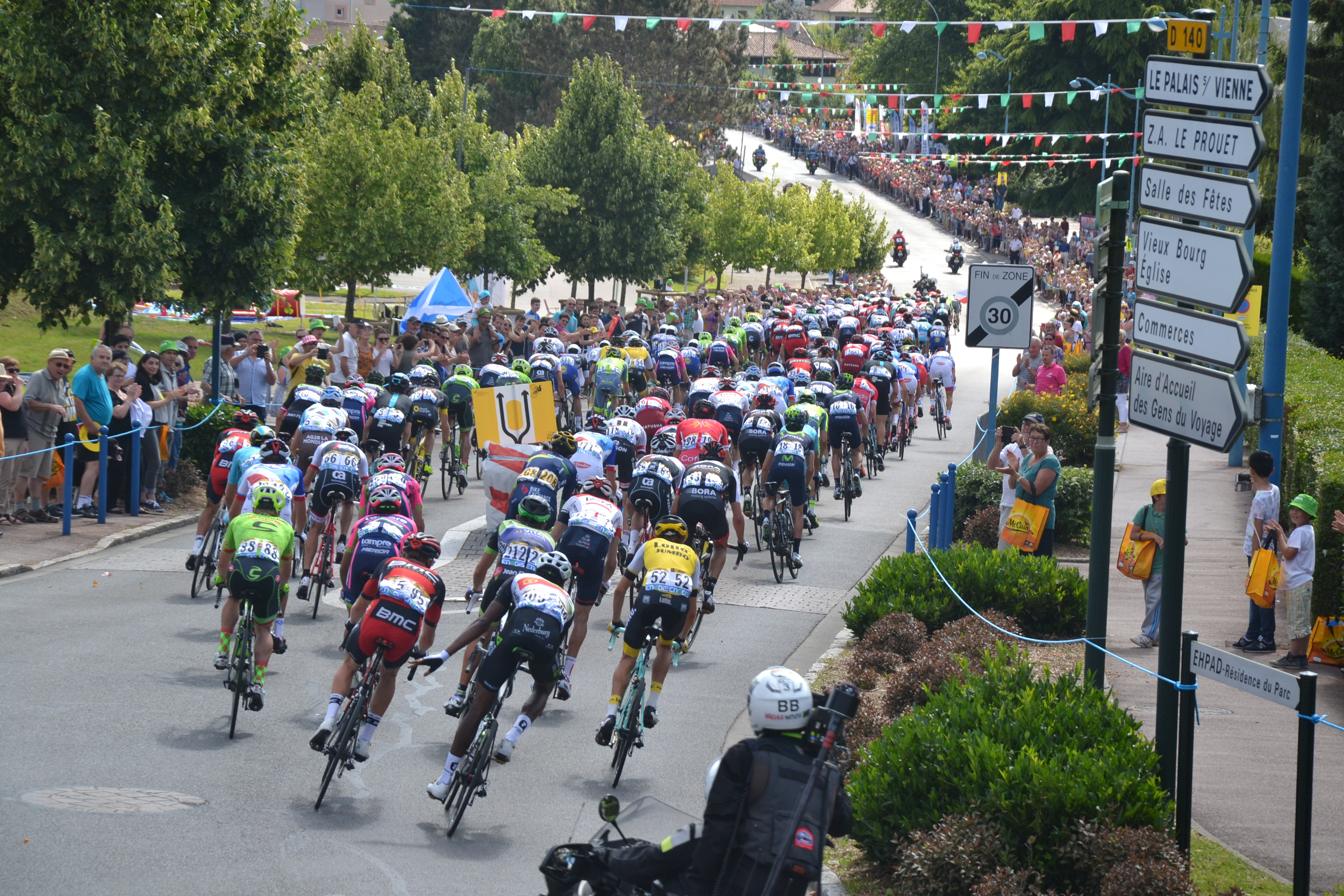
The peloton passes through Panazol, near the end of stage 4

The longest stage of the year's tour, this flat stage departed south from Saumur to Montreuil-Bellay, turning south-east to Les Trois-Moutiers. The riders continued through Loudun, Châtellerault, Paizay-le-Sec, Saint-Savin and Montmorillon to an intermediate sprint at Le Dorat. The race then travelled over the Category 4 Côte de la Maison Neuve, and wound south through Roussac, Bonnac-la-Côte and Le Palais-sur-Vienne to the finish line at Limoges.

Stage 4 result

Rank	Rider	Team	Time
1	Marcel Kittel (GER)	Etixx–Quick-Step	5h 28' 30"
2	Bryan Coquard (FRA)	Direct Énergie	s.t.
3	Peter Sagan (SVK)	Tinkoff	s.t.
4	Dylan Groenewegen (NED)	LottoNL–Jumbo	s.t.
5	Alexander Kristoff (NOR)	Team Katusha	s.t.
6	Sondre Holst Enger (NOR)	IAM Cycling	s.t.
7	Daniel McLay (GBR)	Fortuneo–Vital Concept	s.t.
8	Mark Cavendish (GBR)	Team Dimension Data	s.t.
9	Samuel Dumoulin (FRA)	AG2R La Mondiale	s.t.
10	Simon Gerrans (AUS)	Orica–BikeExchange	s.t.

General classification after stage 4

Rank	Rider	Team	Time
1	Peter Sagan (SVK)	Tinkoff	20h 03' 20"
2	Julian Alaphilippe (FRA)	Etixx–Quick-Step	+ 12"
3	Alejandro Valverde (ESP)	Movistar Team	+ 14"
4	Warren Barguil (FRA)	Team Giant–Alpecin	+ 18"
5	Chris Froome (GBR)	Team Sky	+ 18"
6	Roman Kreuziger (CZE)	Tinkoff	+ 18"
7	Nairo Quintana (COL)	Movistar Team	+ 18"
8	Fabio Aru (ITA)	Astana	+ 18"
9	Michael Matthews (AUS)	Orica–BikeExchange	+ 18"
10	Pierre Rolland (FRA)	Cannondale–Drapac	+ 18"

== Stage 5 ==
6 July 2016 — Limoges to Le Lioran, 216 km (134 mi)

This medium mountain stage departed east from Limoges, over the Category 4 Côte de Saint-Léonard-de-Noblat, through Bujaleuf and turning south-east to Eymoutiers. The riders continued through Bugeat and Meymac to Saint-Angel. The race then turned south to head through Neuvic before climbing the Category 3 Côte du Puy Saint-Mary, quickly followed by an intermediate sprint through Mauriac. The riders continued south-east through Anglards-de-Salers and Salers ascending the Category 3 Col de Néronne to 1,242 metres (4,075 ft). A brief descent was followed by the Category 2 climb of the Pas de Peyrol to 1,589 metres (5,213 ft). The race then descended south on a winding route through Mandailles to the Category 2 climb of the Col du Perthus to 1,309 metres (4,295 ft). Following this climb, the riders descended through Saint-Jacques-des-Blats, and turned north-east to climb the Category 3 Col de Font-de-Cère to 1,294 metres (4,245 ft), before a brief descent and climb to the finish line at Le Lioran.

Stage 5 result

Rank	Rider	Team	Time
1	Greg Van Avermaet (BEL)	BMC Racing Team	5h 31' 36"
2	Thomas De Gendt (BEL)	Lotto–Soudal	+ 2' 34"
3	Rafał Majka (POL)	Tinkoff	+ 5' 04"
4	Joaquim Rodríguez (ESP)	Team Katusha	+ 5' 04"
5	Dan Martin (IRL)	Etixx–Quick-Step	+ 5' 07"
6	Bartosz Huzarski (POL)	Bora–Argon 18	+ 5' 07"
7	Julian Alaphilippe (FRA)	Etixx–Quick-Step	+ 5' 07"
8	Adam Yates (GBR)	Orica–BikeExchange	+ 5' 07"
9	Chris Froome (GBR)	Team Sky	+ 5' 07"
10	Tejay van Garderen (USA)	BMC Racing Team	+ 5' 07"

General classification after stage 5

Rank	Rider	Team	Time
1	Greg Van Avermaet (BEL)	BMC Racing Team	25h 34' 46"
2	Julian Alaphilippe (FRA)	Etixx–Quick-Step	+ 5' 11"
3	Alejandro Valverde (ESP)	Movistar Team	+ 5' 13"
4	Joaquim Rodríguez (ESP)	Team Katusha	+ 5' 14"
5	Chris Froome (GBR)	Team Sky	+ 5' 17"
6	Warren Barguil (FRA)	Team Giant–Alpecin	+ 5' 17"
7	Nairo Quintana (COL)	Movistar Team	+ 5' 17"
8	Fabio Aru (ITA)	Astana	+ 5' 17"
9	Pierre Rolland (FRA)	Cannondale–Drapac	+ 5' 17"
10	Dan Martin (IRL)	Etixx–Quick-Step	+ 5' 17"

== Stage 6 ==
7 July 2016 — Arpajon-sur-Cère to Montauban, 190.5 km (118 mi)

This hilly to flat stage departed south from Arpajon-sur-Cère, through Montsalvy to Vieillevie. The riders then headed west through Saint-Parthem to the Category 3 climb of the Col des Estaques to 322 metres (1,056 ft). The descent south into Decazeville was followed by the Category 4 climb of the Côte d'Aubin to 335 metres (1,099 ft). This then gently ascended into the intermediate sprint at Montbazens, where the route turned south-west. The race then travelled through Lanuéjouls, Villefranche-de-Rouergue, Parisot and Saint-Antonin-Noble-Val where the riders turned west to climb the Category 3 Côte de Saint-Antonin-Noble-Val to 289 metres (948 ft). Following the descent south-west into Montricoux, the race continued through Saint-Étienne-de-Tulmont to a flat finish at Montauban.

Stage 6 result

Rank	Rider	Team	Time
1	Mark Cavendish (GBR)	Team Dimension Data	4h 43' 48"
2	Marcel Kittel (GER)	Etixx–Quick-Step	s.t.
3	Daniel McLay (GBR)	Fortuneo–Vital Concept	s.t.
4	Alexander Kristoff (NOR)	Team Katusha	s.t.
5	Christophe Laporte (FRA)	Cofidis	s.t.
6	Peter Sagan (SVK)	Tinkoff	s.t.
7	Dylan Groenewegen (NED)	LottoNL–Jumbo	s.t.
8	Edward Theuns (BEL)	Trek–Segafredo	s.t.
9	Bryan Coquard (FRA)	Direct Énergie	s.t.
10	Shane Archbold (NZL)	Bora–Argon 18	s.t.

General classification after stage 6

Rank	Rider	Team	Time
1	Greg Van Avermaet (BEL)	BMC Racing Team	30h 18' 38"
2	Julian Alaphilippe (FRA)	Etixx–Quick-Step	+ 5' 11"
3	Alejandro Valverde (ESP)	Movistar Team	+ 5' 13"
4	Joaquim Rodríguez (ESP)	Team Katusha	+ 5' 15"
5	Chris Froome (GBR)	Team Sky	+ 5' 17"
6	Warren Barguil (FRA)	Team Giant–Alpecin	+ 5' 17"
7	Nairo Quintana (COL)	Movistar Team	+ 5' 17"
8	Pierre Rolland (FRA)	Cannondale–Drapac	+ 5' 17"
9	Fabio Aru (ITA)	Astana	+ 5' 17"
10	Dan Martin (IRL)	Etixx–Quick-Step	+ 5' 17"

== Stage 7 ==
8 July 2016 — L'Isle-Jourdain to Lac de Payolle, 162.5 km (101 mi)

This medium mountain stage departed from L'Isle-Jourdain, heading south-west through Lombez to Boulogne-sur-Gesse. The race then turned west travelling through Castelnau-Magnoac and Trie-sur-Baïse to Chelle-Debat. The route then turned south through Bordes and south-east to ascend the Category 4 Côte de Capvern, continuing without descent into La Barthe-de-Neste. The riders then headed south through an intermediate sprint at Sarrancolin, continuing to Arreau before turning west to begin the 12 kilometres (7.5 mi) climb of the Category 1 Col d'Aspin to 1,490 metres (4,890 ft). The riders then had a 7 kilometres (4.3 mi) descent to the finish line at Lac de Payolle.

Steve Cummings won the stage with a solo attack. After the first five riders passed, the red inflatable 1 kilometre (0.62 mi) marker collapsed, blocking chasing riders, so the race organisation decided to use the timegaps measured at the 3 kilometres (1.9 mi) mark. Adam Yates was most affected by the collapsing flamme rouge, because he was 7 seconds in front of the other favorites at that moment, and the marker collapsed right in front of him, causing him to crash into it. After the podium ceremony the commissaires revised the result, moving Yates into second place on the General Classification and into the white jersey, which he wore non-stop for the remainder of the 2016 competition.

Stage 7 result

Rank	Rider	Team	Time
1	Steve Cummings (GBR)	Team Dimension Data	3h 48' 09"
2	Daryl Impey (RSA)	Orica–BikeExchange	+ 1' 04"
3	Daniel Navarro (ESP)	Cofidis	+ 1' 04"
4	Vincenzo Nibali (ITA)	Astana	+ 1' 58"
5	Greg Van Avermaet (BEL)	BMC Racing Team	+ 2' 57"
6	Luis Ángel Maté (ESP)	Cofidis	+ 3' 37"
7	Geraint Thomas (GBR)	Team Sky	+ 3' 37"
8	Wout Poels (NED)	Team Sky	+ 3' 37"
9	Gorka Izagirre (ESP)	Movistar Team	+ 3' 37"
10	Alejandro Valverde (ESP)	Movistar Team	+ 3' 37"

General classification after stage 7

Rank	Rider	Team	Time
1	Greg Van Avermaet (BEL)	BMC Racing Team	34h 09' 44"
2	Adam Yates (GBR)	Orica–BikeExchange	+ 5' 50"
3	Julian Alaphilippe (FRA)	Etixx–Quick-Step	+ 5' 51"
4	Alejandro Valverde (ESP)	Movistar Team	+ 5' 53"
5	Joaquim Rodríguez (ESP)	Team Katusha	+ 5' 54"
6	Chris Froome (GBR)	Team Sky	+ 5' 57"
7	Nairo Quintana (COL)	Movistar Team	+ 5' 57"
8	Warren Barguil (FRA)	Team Giant–Alpecin	+ 5' 57"
9	Pierre Rolland (FRA)	Cannondale–Drapac	+ 5' 57"
10	Dan Martin (IRL)	Etixx–Quick-Step	+ 5' 57"

== Stage 8 ==
9 July 2016 — Pau to Bagnères-de-Luchon, 184 km (114 mi)

This mountainous stage departed from Pau, heading south-east, through Lestelle-Bétharram, to Lourdes. The race then turned south through Ayros-Arbouix and Villelongue, with an intermediate sprint at Esquièze-Sère, just before Luz-Saint-Sauveur. The route then headed east through Barèges to traverse the Hors catégorie Col du Tourmalet, a 19 kilometres (12 mi) climb to 2,115 metres (6,939 ft) for the Souvenir Jacques Goddet, with a descent into Sainte-Marie-de-Campan. The race then turned south and began the immediate ascent of the Category 2 La Hourquette d'Ancizan to 1,564 metres (5,131 ft) and descended into Saint-Lary-Soulan. The riders then turned east, once again, and ascended the Category 1 Col de Val Louron-Azet to 1,580 metres (5,180 ft), descending into Loudenvielle. The final climb was the Category 1 Col de Peyresourde at 1,569 metres (5,148 ft), before descending to the finish line at Bagnères-de-Luchon.

Michael Mørkøv, who had been battling with injuries all week, became the first rider to withdraw from the tour. This set a new all-time record for the longest time in which the peloton had remained intact prior to the first withdrawal.

Chris Froome won the stage after surprisingly breaking away from a group of 14 riders just before the summit of the Col de Peyresourde, with about 15 km remaining. On the descent into Bagnères-de-Luchon he adopted a 'super aero' position, pedalling as he did so reaching a top speed of 90.9 km/h. With 10 km to go Froome opened up a gap of 11 seconds and he maintained the lead to the end, with the following pack finishing 13 seconds behind. With the time bonus, Froome took the yellow jersey for the first time in the race, wearing it non-stop through the remainder of the 2016 competition.

Stage 8 result

Rank	Rider	Team	Time
1	Chris Froome (GBR)	Team Sky	4h 57' 33"
2	Dan Martin (IRL)	Etixx–Quick-Step	+ 13"
3	Joaquim Rodríguez (ESP)	Team Katusha	+ 13"
4	Romain Bardet (FRA)	AG2R La Mondiale	+ 13"
5	Roman Kreuziger (CZE)	Tinkoff	+ 13"
6	Fabio Aru (ITA)	Astana	+ 13"
7	Adam Yates (GBR)	Orica–BikeExchange	+ 13"
8	Alejandro Valverde (ESP)	Movistar Team	+ 13"
9	Bauke Mollema (NED)	Trek–Segafredo	+ 13"
10	Richie Porte (AUS)	BMC Racing Team	+ 13"

General classification after stage 8

Rank	Rider	Team	Time
1	Chris Froome (GBR)	Team Sky	39h 13' 04"
2	Adam Yates (GBR)	Orica–BikeExchange	+ 16"
3	Joaquim Rodríguez (ESP)	Team Katusha	+ 16"
4	Dan Martin (IRL)	Etixx–Quick-Step	+ 17"
5	Alejandro Valverde (ESP)	Movistar Team	+ 19"
6	Nairo Quintana (COL)	Movistar Team	+ 23"
7	Fabio Aru (ITA)	Astana	+ 23"
8	Tejay van Garderen (USA)	BMC Racing Team	+ 23"
9	Romain Bardet (FRA)	AG2R La Mondiale	+ 23"
10	Bauke Mollema (NED)	Trek–Segafredo	+ 23"

== Stage 9 ==
10 July 2016 — Vielha Val d'Aran to Andorre Arcalis, 184.5 km (115 mi)

This mountainous stage departed from Vielha Val d'Aran in Spain, heading east over the 13.7 kilometres (8.5 mi) Category 1 climb of the Port de la Bonaigua to 2,072 metres (6,798 ft). The riders then headed south-east through La Guingueta d'Àneu, and turned south-west at Llavorsí, to the valley floor at Sort. The route then turned south-east for the 19 kilometres (12 mi) climb of the Category 1 Port del Cantó to 1,721 metres (5,646 ft), descending to the valley floor at Montferrer i Castellbò. From La Seu d'Urgell, the race climbed north to an intermediate sprint at Andorra la Vella, and continued climbing into the Category 2 summit of the Côte de la Comella at 1,347 metres (4,419 ft). Following a short descent to Encamp was the Category 1 climb of the Col de Beixalis to 1,796 metres (5,892 ft). The race then descended to Ordino, before beginning the 10.1 kilometres (6.3 mi) Hors catégorie climb to 2,240 metres (7,350 ft) for the finish line at Andorra Arcalis.

Two time overall winner Alberto Contador, one of the pre-race favorites, abandoned the Tour during Stage 9.

Stage 9 result

Rank	Rider	Team	Time
1	Tom Dumoulin (NED)	Team Giant–Alpecin	5h 16' 24"
2	Rui Costa (POR)	Lampre–Merida	+ 38"
3	Rafał Majka (POL)	Tinkoff	+ 38"
4	Daniel Navarro (ESP)	Cofidis	+ 1' 39"
5	Winner Anacona (COL)	Movistar Team	+ 1' 57"
6	Thibaut Pinot (FRA)	FDJ	+ 2' 30"
7	George Bennett (NZL)	LottoNL–Jumbo	+ 2' 48"
8	Diego Rosa (ITA)	Astana	+ 2' 52"
9	Mathias Frank (SUI)	IAM Cycling	+ 3' 44"
10	Adam Yates (GBR)	Orica–BikeExchange	+ 6' 35"

General classification after stage 9

Rank	Rider	Team	Time
1	Chris Froome (GBR)	Team Sky	44h 36' 03"
2	Adam Yates (GBR)	Orica–BikeExchange	+ 16"
3	Dan Martin (IRL)	Etixx–Quick-Step	+ 19"
4	Nairo Quintana (COL)	Movistar Team	+ 23"
5	Joaquim Rodríguez (ESP)	Team Katusha	+ 37"
6	Romain Bardet (FRA)	AG2R La Mondiale	+ 44"
7	Bauke Mollema (NED)	Trek–Segafredo	+ 44"
8	Sergio Henao (COL)	Team Sky	+ 44"
9	Louis Meintjes (RSA)	Lampre–Merida	+ 55"
10	Alejandro Valverde (ESP)	Movistar Team	+ 1' 01"

== Rest day 1 ==
11 July 2016 — Andorra

== Stage 10 ==
12 July 2016 — Escaldes-Engordany to Revel, 197 km (122 mi)

In this medium mountain stage, the riders departed from Escaldes-Engordany in Andorra, heading east over the 22.6 kilometres (14.0 mi) Category 1 climb of the Port d'Envalira to 2,408 metres (7,900 ft). The riders then descended north-east back into France to Ax-les-Thermes, and turned north-west still gradually descending towards Tarascon-sur-Ariège. The race then turned north-east towards Mercus-Garrabet and wound east through Nalzen to Lavelanet. The route continued north-east to an intermediate sprint at Aigues-Vives. The riders then continued north through Mirepoix, Plavilla, Fendeille and Castelnaudary reaching the short Category 3 climb of the Côte de Saint-Ferréol. The race then descended to the finish line in Revel. Peter Sagan took the green jersey for the third time in the 2016 competition, and wore it non-stop for the remainder of the Tour.

Stage 10 result

Rank	Rider	Team	Time
1	Michael Matthews (AUS)	Orica–BikeExchange	4h 22' 38"
2	Peter Sagan (SVK)	Tinkoff	s.t.
3	Edvald Boasson Hagen (NOR)	Team Dimension Data	s.t.
4	Greg Van Avermaet (BEL)	BMC Racing Team	s.t.
5	Samuel Dumoulin (FRA)	AG2R La Mondiale	s.t.
6	Daryl Impey (RSA)	Orica–BikeExchange	+ 2"
7	Luke Durbridge (AUS)	Orica–BikeExchange	+ 1' 10"
8	Damiano Caruso (ITA)	BMC Racing Team	+ 3' 01"
9	Gorka Izagirre (ESP)	Movistar Team	+ 3' 10"
10	Tony Gallopin (FRA)	Lotto–Soudal	+ 3' 10"

General classification after stage 10

Rank	Rider	Team	Time
1	Chris Froome (GBR)	Team Sky	49h 08' 20"
2	Adam Yates (GBR)	Orica–BikeExchange	+ 16"
3	Dan Martin (IRL)	Etixx–Quick-Step	+ 19"
4	Nairo Quintana (COL)	Movistar Team	+ 23"
5	Joaquim Rodríguez (ESP)	Team Katusha	+ 37"
6	Bauke Mollema (NED)	Trek–Segafredo	+ 44"
7	Romain Bardet (FRA)	AG2R La Mondiale	+ 44"
8	Sergio Henao (COL)	Team Sky	+ 44"
9	Louis Meintjes (RSA)	Lampre–Merida	+ 55"
10	Alejandro Valverde (ESP)	Movistar Team	+ 1' 01"

== Stage 11 ==
13 July 2016 — Carcassonne to Montpellier, 162.5 km (101 mi)

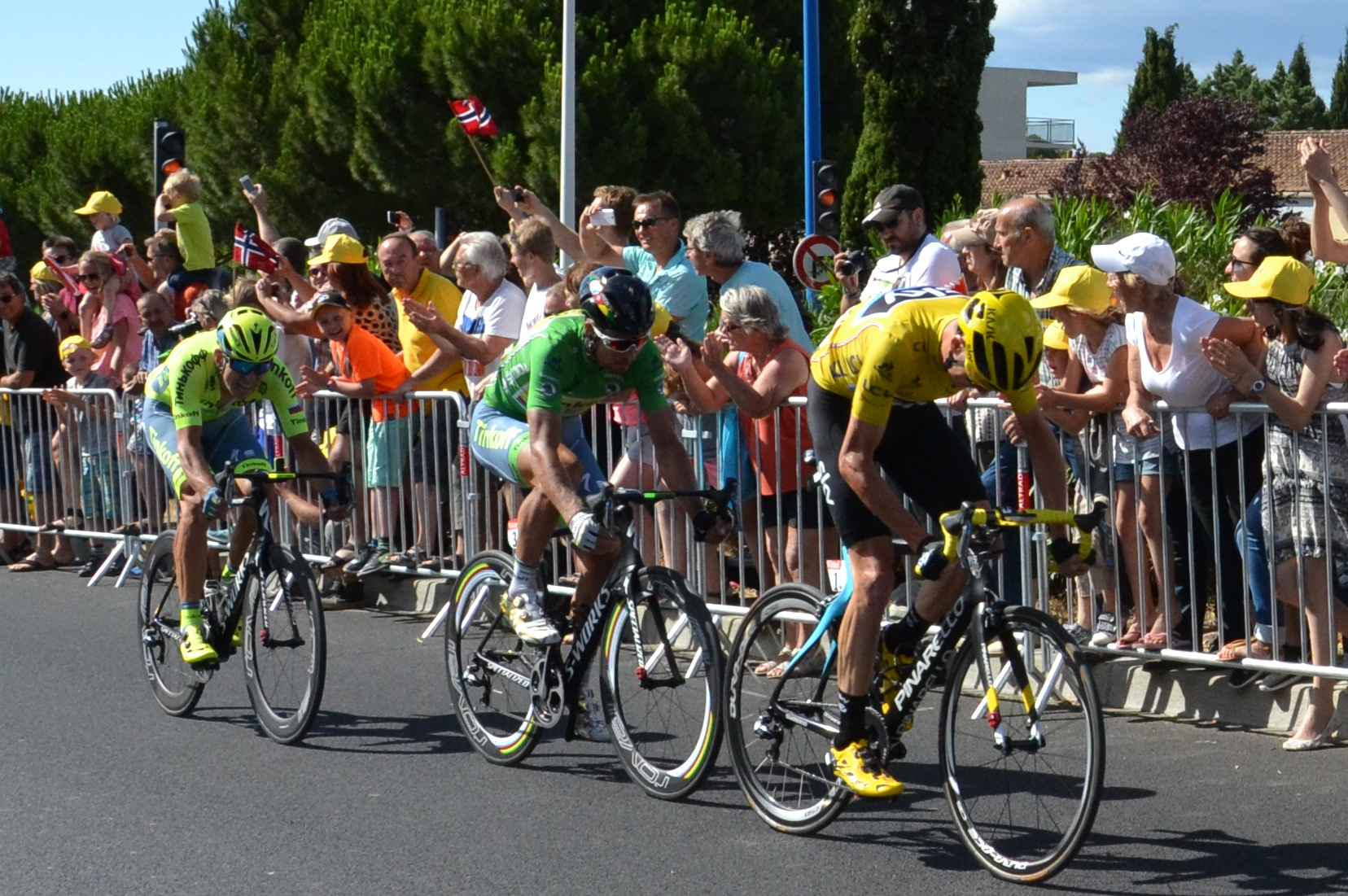
Froome, Sagan and Bodnar 500 m (550 yd) from the finish line on stage 11

This flat stage departed from Carcassonne, heading east through Caunes-Minervois and Siran to the Category 4 climb of the Côte de Minerve to 245 metres (804 ft). The riders then descended to Aigues-Vives, and turned north-east to climb the Category 4 Côte de Villespassans to 207 metres (679 ft) descending through Saint-Chinian to Cessenon-sur-Orb. Continuing east, the riders passed through Murviel-lès-Béziers, Magalas and Alignan-du-Vent to an intermediate sprint at Pézenas. The race then headed through Montagnac, passing Valmagne Abbey, and continuing on through Montbazin. Bearing towards the north-east, the race headed through Pignan to the finish line in Montpellier.

In a stage affected by crosswinds, a small group comprising the general classification leader Froome, the points leader Sagan and their respective team-mates Geraint Thomas and Maciej Bodnar escaped from the peloton 13 km from the finish, building a lead of as much as 26 seconds. Sagan eventually won the stage ahead of Froome and Bodnar, 6 seconds clear of the bunch. With his time bonus for finishing second, Froome increased his lead by 12 seconds overall.

Stage 11 result

Rank	Rider	Team	Time
1	Peter Sagan (SVK)	Tinkoff	3h 26' 23"
2	Chris Froome (GBR)	Team Sky	s.t.
3	Maciej Bodnar (POL)	Tinkoff	s.t.
4	Alexander Kristoff (NOR)	Team Katusha	+ 6"
5	Christophe Laporte (FRA)	Cofidis	+ 6"
6	Jasper Stuyven (BEL)	Trek–Segafredo	+ 6"
7	Edvald Boasson Hagen (NOR)	Team Dimension Data	+ 6"
8	André Greipel (GER)	Lotto–Soudal	+ 6"
9	Sondre Holst Enger (NOR)	IAM Cycling	+ 6"
10	Oliver Naesen (BEL)	IAM Cycling	+ 6"

General classification after stage 11

Rank	Rider	Team	Time
1	Chris Froome (GBR)	Team Sky	52h 34' 37"
2	Adam Yates (GBR)	Orica–BikeExchange	+ 28"
3	Dan Martin (IRL)	Etixx–Quick-Step	+ 31"
4	Nairo Quintana (COL)	Movistar Team	+ 35"
5	Bauke Mollema (NED)	Trek–Segafredo	+ 56"
6	Romain Bardet (FRA)	AG2R La Mondiale	+ 56"
7	Sergio Henao (COL)	Team Sky	+ 56"
8	Alejandro Valverde (ESP)	Movistar Team	+ 1' 13"
9	Tejay van Garderen (USA)	BMC Racing Team	+ 1' 13"
10	Roman Kreuziger (CZE)	Tinkoff	+ 1' 28"
