= Mountain pass cycling milestones =

Mountain pass cycling milestones are signposts that provide cyclists with information about their current position with regard to the summit of the mountain pass. They always provide information for cyclists going uphill. Sometimes the signs are two-sided, thereby providing information also for cyclists going downhill.

Mountain pass cycling milestones are particularly useful to cyclists that are not familiar with the climbs. In general, they allow cyclists to schedule breaks as well as to plan food and liquid uptake. They furthermore can serve as motivational landmarks.

Local institutions invest in this cycling infrastructure to offer service to cyclists, thus promoting tourism in their region.

== Type of information ==
Mountain pass cycling milestones always carry a pictogram of a bicycle or cyclist and specify the following standard information

- name of mountain pass
- altitude
- distance to summit
- average slope in the following section of the pass

Additional information found in some cases includes

- name and/or emblem of local institutions
- number of the road
- altitude of the summit
- distances to villages or town close to summit
- distance travelled from the start of the mountain pass

Typically, the signposts are placed every kilometer such that the slope corresponds to the average across the next kilometer.

== France ==
Mountain pass cycling milestones have become common in many major mountain passes in the French Pyrenees and Alps. Often their design is chosen to resemble the main features of conventional French milestones, which is a white bottom and a yellow top.

== Mountain passes that are known to have cycling milestones ==
The following table lists mountain passes signposted with cycling milestones, ordered by the height of the summit. If a mountain pass is not included in the table below, that does not imply that it has no cycling milestones. It can likewise mean that is not yet documented in this table.

All signs display the standard information (see above). The table specifies the precision of the slope. Additional information and emblems (if any) are explained in the column with remarks.

Name	Height	Country	Precision of slope	Example and season	Remarks
Cime de la Bonette from Jausiers uphill	2,802 m (9,193 ft)	France	0.1%	Summer 2014	Emblem left: similar to the one of Jausiers; emblem right: Provence-Alpes-Côte d'Azur; C1: number of road; bold 2: distance from starting point in Jausiers.
Cime de la Bonette to Jausiers downhill	2,802 m (9,193 ft)	France	0.1%	Summer 2014	Emblem left: similar to the one of Jausiers; emblem right: Provence-Alpes-Côte d'Azur; C1: number of road; bold 2: distance to starting point in Jausiers.
Cime de la Bonette from Saint-Étienne-de-Tinée uphill	2,802 m (9,193 ft)	France	1%	Summer 2014	Emblem left: Métropole Nice Côte d'Azur; Emblem right: Mercantour National Park; M2205: number of road; bold 77: distance from starting point of this road.
Cime de la Bonette to Saint-Étienne-de-Tinée downhill	2,802 m (9,193 ft)	France	1%	Summer 2014	Emblem left: Métropole Nice Côte d'Azur; emblem right: Mercantour National Park; M2205: number of road; bold 77: distance to starting point of this road.
Col de l'Iseran from Bonneval-sur-Arc uphill only	2,770 m (9,090 ft)	France	1%	Summer 2015	On the side the logo of Savoie and the number of the road (D 902) is displayed.
Col de l'Iseran from Val-d'Isère uphill only	2,770 m (9,090 ft)	France	1%	Summer 2015	On the side the logo of Savoie and the number of the road (D 902) is displayed.
Col Agnel from Château-Queyras uphill only	2,744 m (9,003 ft)	France	0.1%	Summer 2014	Emblem:Conseil général Hautes Alpes; 2744 m: height of summit; A QR code is included in the lower right.
Col du Galibier from Valloire uphill only	2,642 m (8,668 ft)	France	1%	Summer 2015	On the side the logo of Savoie and the number of the road (D 902) is displayed.
Col du Galibier from Col du Lautaret uphill only	2,642 m (8,668 ft)	France	0.1%	Summer 2015	Emblem:Conseil général Hautes Alpes; 2642 m: height of summit; A QR code is included in the lower right.
Col d'Izoard from Briançon uphill only	2,360 m (7,740 ft)	France	0.1%	Summer 2014	Emblem:Conseil général Hautes Alpes; 2360 m: height of summit; A QR code is included in the lower right.
Col d'Izoard from Guillestre uphill only	2,360 m (7,740 ft)	France	0.1%	Summer 2014	Emblem:Conseil général Hautes Alpes; 2360 m: height of summit; A QR code is included in the lower right.
Col de la Cayolle from Barcelonette uphill only	2,326 m (7,631 ft)	France	1%	Summer 2014	Emblem:Conseil général Alpes-de-Haute-Provence; D902: number of road.
Col d'Allos from Barcelonette uphill only	2,250 m (7,380 ft)	France	1%	Summer 2014	Emblem:Conseil général Alpes-de-Haute-Provence; D908: number of road.
Col du Tourmalet from Sainte-Marie-de-Campan uphill only	2,115 m (6,939 ft)	France	0.5%	Summer 2015	Emblem: Conseil général Hautes-Pyrénées; 2115 m: height of summit.
Col du Tourmalet from Luz-Saint-Sauveur uphill only	2,115 m (6,939 ft)	France	0.5%	Summer 2015	Emblem: Conseil général Hautes-Pyrénées; 2115 m: height of summit.
Col de Vars from Guillestre uphill only	2,109 m (6,919 ft)	France	0.1%	Summer 2014	Emblem:Conseil général Hautes Alpes; 2109 m: height of summit; A QR code is included in the lower right.
Col de Vars from Jausiers uphill only	2,109 m (6,919 ft)	France	1%	Summer 2014	Emblem: Conseil général Alpes-de-Haute-Provence; D902: number of road.
Col des Champs from Colmars uphill only	2,087 m (6,847 ft)	France	1%	Summer 2014	Emblem: Conseil général Alpes-de-Haute-Provence; D2: number of road.
Col de la Madeleine from La Léchère uphill only	1,993 m (6,539 ft)	France	1%	Summer 2011	On the side (here not visible) the logo of Savoie and the number of the road (D 213) is displayed.
Col de la Madeleine from La Chambre uphill only	1,993 m (6,539 ft)	France	1%	Summer 2015	On the side the logo of Savoie and the number of the road (D 213) is displayed.
Col du Glandon from La Chambre uphill only	1,924 m (6,312 ft)	France	1%	Summer 2015	On the side the logo of Savoie and the number of the road (D 927) is displayed.
Col de la Couillole from Saint-Sauveur-sur-Tinée up- and downhill	1,679 m (5,509 ft)	France	1%	Summer 2014	M30: number of road; bold 11: distance from and to starting point in Saint-Sauveur-sur-Tinée
Peyragudes from Col de Peyresourde uphill only	1,620 m (5,310 ft)	France	0.5%	Summer 2015	Emblem: Conseil général Hautes-Pyrénées; 1620 m: height of summit.
Col de Peyresourde from Armenteule uphill only	1,569 m (5,148 ft)	France	0.5%	Summer 2015	Emblem: Conseil général Hautes-Pyrénées; 1569 m: height of summit.
Col du Télégraphe from Saint-Michel-de-Maurienne uphill only	1,566 m (5,138 ft)	France	1%	Summer 2015	On the side the logo of Savoie and the number of the road (D 902) is displayed.
Hourquette d'Ancizan from Payolle uphill only	1,564 m (5,131 ft)	France	0.1%	Summer 2015	Emblem: Conseil général Hautes-Pyrénées; 1564 m: height of summit.
Hourquette d'Ancizan from Ancizan uphill only	1,564 m (5,131 ft)	France	0.1%	Summer 2015	Emblem: Conseil général Hautes-Pyrénées; 1564 m: height of summit.
Col d'Aspin from Sainte-Marie-de-Campan uphill only	1,489 m (4,885 ft)	France	0.5%	Summer 2015	Emblem: Conseil général Hautes-Pyrénées; 1489 m: height of summit.
Col d'Aspin from Arreau uphill only	1,489 m (4,885 ft)	France	0.5%	Summer 2015	Emblem: Conseil général Hautes-Pyrénées; 1489 m: height of summit.

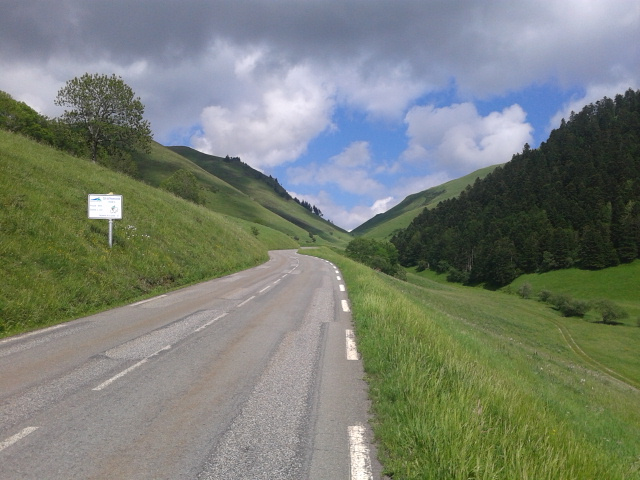
View on the last two kilometers of the Col de Peyresourde in the climb from Armenteule. On the left side of the road a mountain pass cycling milestone can be seen.
