= La Hourquette d'Ancizan =

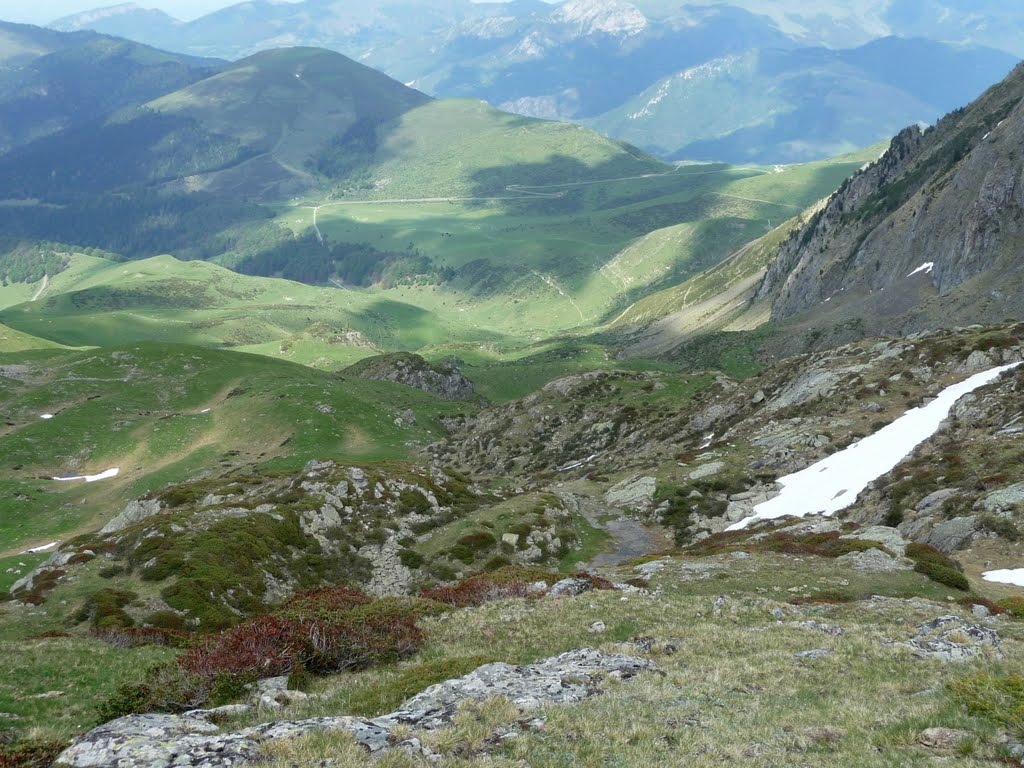

- Location within Pyrenees
- Elevation: 1,564 metres (5,131 ft)
- Traversed by: D113

Third Approach
- Location: Hautes-Pyrénées, France
- Range: Pyrenees
- Coordinates: 42°54′01″N 0°18′19″E

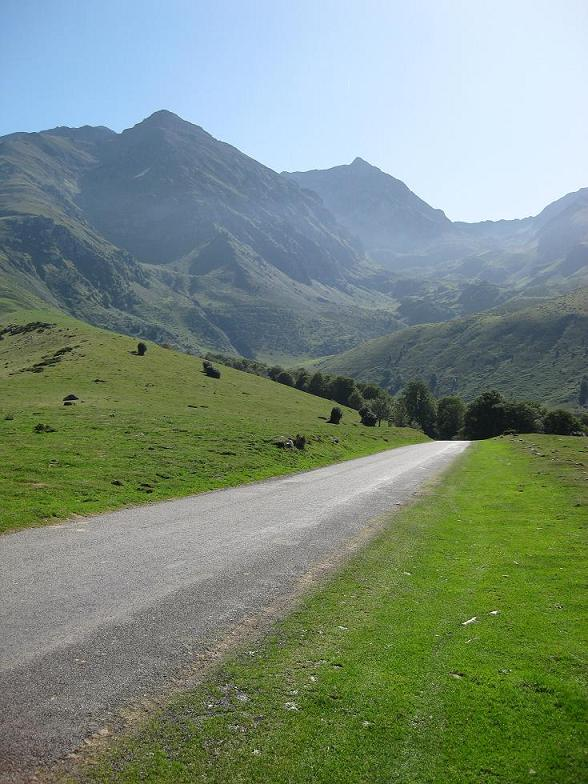
Northern view from Hourquette d'Ancizan

La Hourquette d'Ancizan (elevation 1,564 m (5,131 ft)) is a mountain pass in the French Pyrenees in the department of Hautes-Pyrénées, between the communities of Ancizan (east) and Campan (west).

== Toponymy ==
The origin of the word hourquette is unclear. French Wikipedia speculates the word is derived from a Gascon given name, via the Latin furca meaning 'fork'. The word is very similar to the Spanish noun horqueta 'fork' and French noun fourchette 'fork', both of which have etymological roots in the same Latin word furca.

The word hourquette appears frequently in the toponymy of the Hautes-Pyrénées, particularly in the names of cols. In practical French usage, it could be taken to mean 'small pass'.

== Details of climb ==
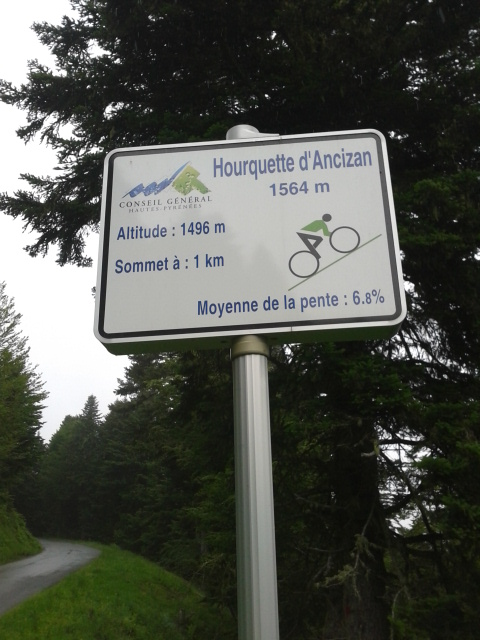
One of the mountain pass cycling milestones along the ascent from Ancizan

Starting from Ancizan, the climb is 10.3 km (6.4 mi) long. Over this distance, the climb is 805 m (2,641 ft) (an average of 7.8%). After Ancizan, the road goes up sharply, with stretches of 15% in the first kilometre, but after the first 3 km (1.9 mi), the climb becomes more moderate.

Starting from Campan, the climb is 22.6 km (14.0 mi) long. Over this distance, the climb is 904 m (2,966 ft) (an average of 4.0%), with the steepest section being at 12.0%. On both sides of the climb mountain pass cycling milestones are placed every kilometre. They indicate the height of the summit, the distance to the summit, the current height, and the average slope in the following kilometre. Such signposting for cyclists has become common in most major mountain passes in the French Pyrenees and Alps.

== Appearances in Tour de France ==
La Hourquette d'Ancizan was first used in the Tour de France on stage 12 of the 2011 tour, when the leader over the summit was Laurent Mangel.

The climb was also used in the 2013 tour on the 168.5 km "roller-coaster" stage 9 from Saint-Girons to Bagnères-de-Bigorre. Dan Martin from Garmin-Sharp won the stage.

The climb was used in the 2016 tour on the 184.4 km 8 from Pau to Bagnères-de-Luchon. Chris Froome of Team Sky won the stage and took the yellow jersey.

The climb was part of 210 km stage 12 of the 2019 tour, from Toulouse to Bagnères-de-Bigorre, ascending from Ancizan following the Col de Peyresourde.

The climb was part of 130 km stage 17 of the 2022 tour, from Saint-Gaudens to Peyragudes, ascending from Payolle following the Col d'Aspin.

The climb was part of 152 km stage 14 of the 2024 tour, from Pau to Saint-Lary-Soulan Pla d'Adet, ascending from Payolle following the Col du Tourmalet.

Year	Stage	Category	Start	Finish	Leader at the summit
2024	14	2	Pau	Saint-Lary-Soulan Pla d'Adet	David Gaudu (FRA)
2022	17	2	Saint-Gaudens	Peyragudes	Thibaut Pinot (FRA)
2019	12	1	Toulouse	Bagnères-de-Bigorre	Simon Yates (GBR)
2016	8	2	Pau	Bagnères-de-Luchon	Chris Froome (GBR)
2013	9	1	Saint-Girons	Bagnères-de-Bigorre	Daniel Martin (IRL)
2011	12	1	Cugnaux	Luz Ardiden	Laurent Mangel (FRA)
