= Col d'Aspin =

Mountain pass in the French Pyrenees

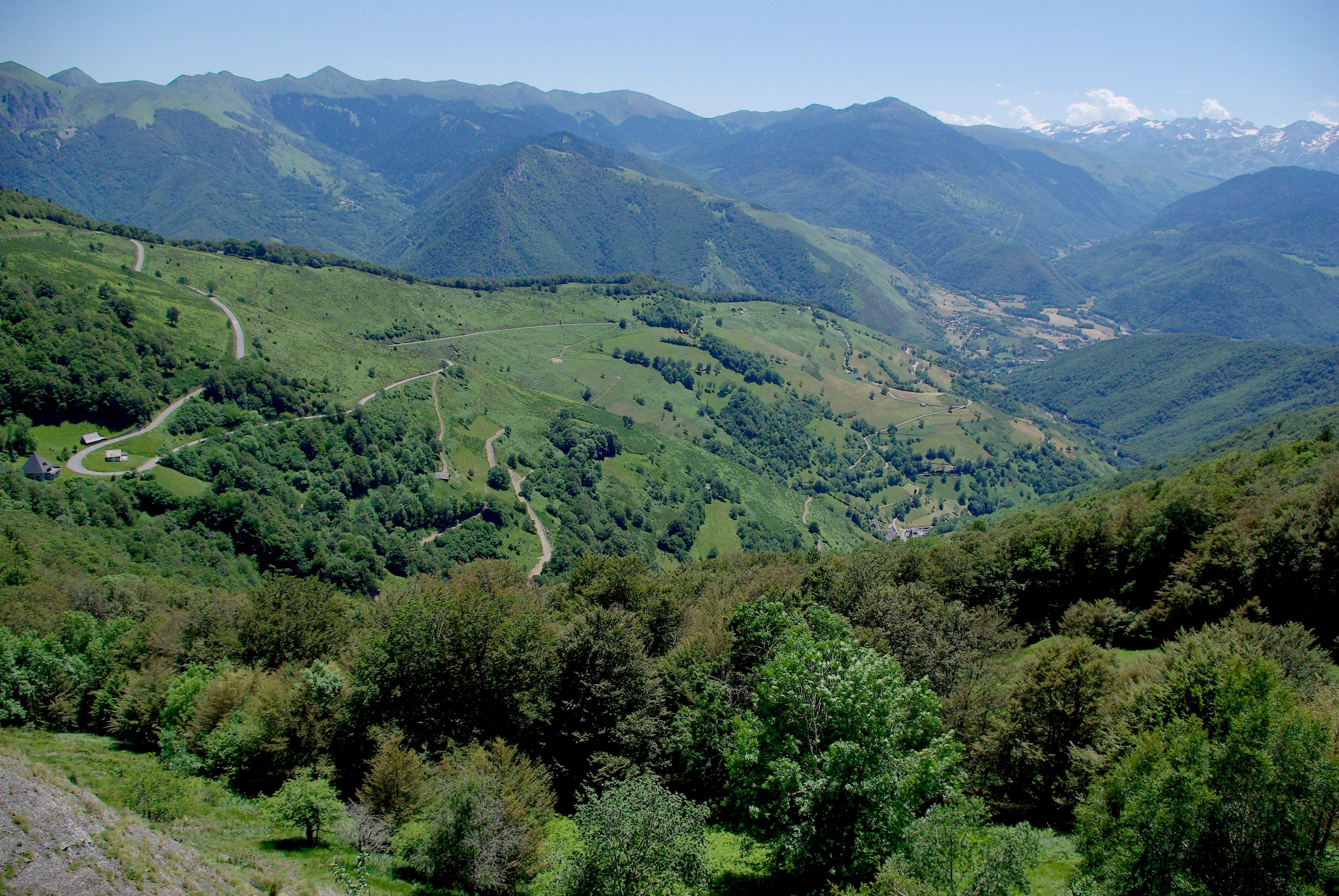
- View from the col d'Aspin showing the climb from Arreau.

- Location within Pyrenees
- Elevation: 1,489 m (4,885 ft)
- Traversed by: D918

Location
- Location: France
- Range: Pyrenees
- Coordinates: 42°56′32.3″N 0°19′38.6″E

Col d'Aspin (Occitan: Còth d'Aspin) (elevation 1,489 m (4,885 ft)) is a mountain pass in the French Pyrenees in the department of the Hautes-Pyrénées. It connects Sainte-Marie-de-Campan, in the upper Adour valley, with Arreau, on the River Neste.

== Details of the climbs ==
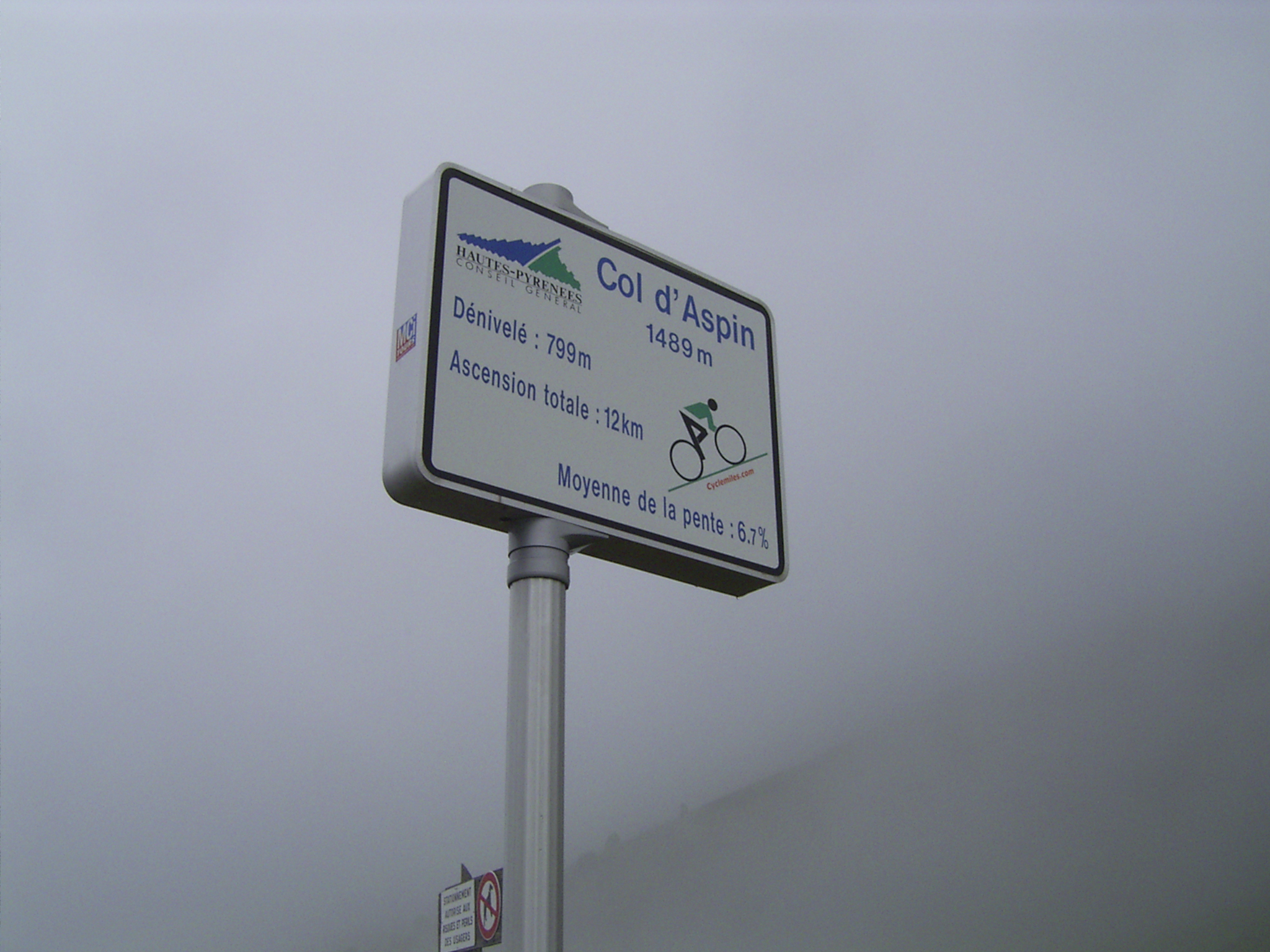
Signpost at the summit providing information about the ascent from Arreau

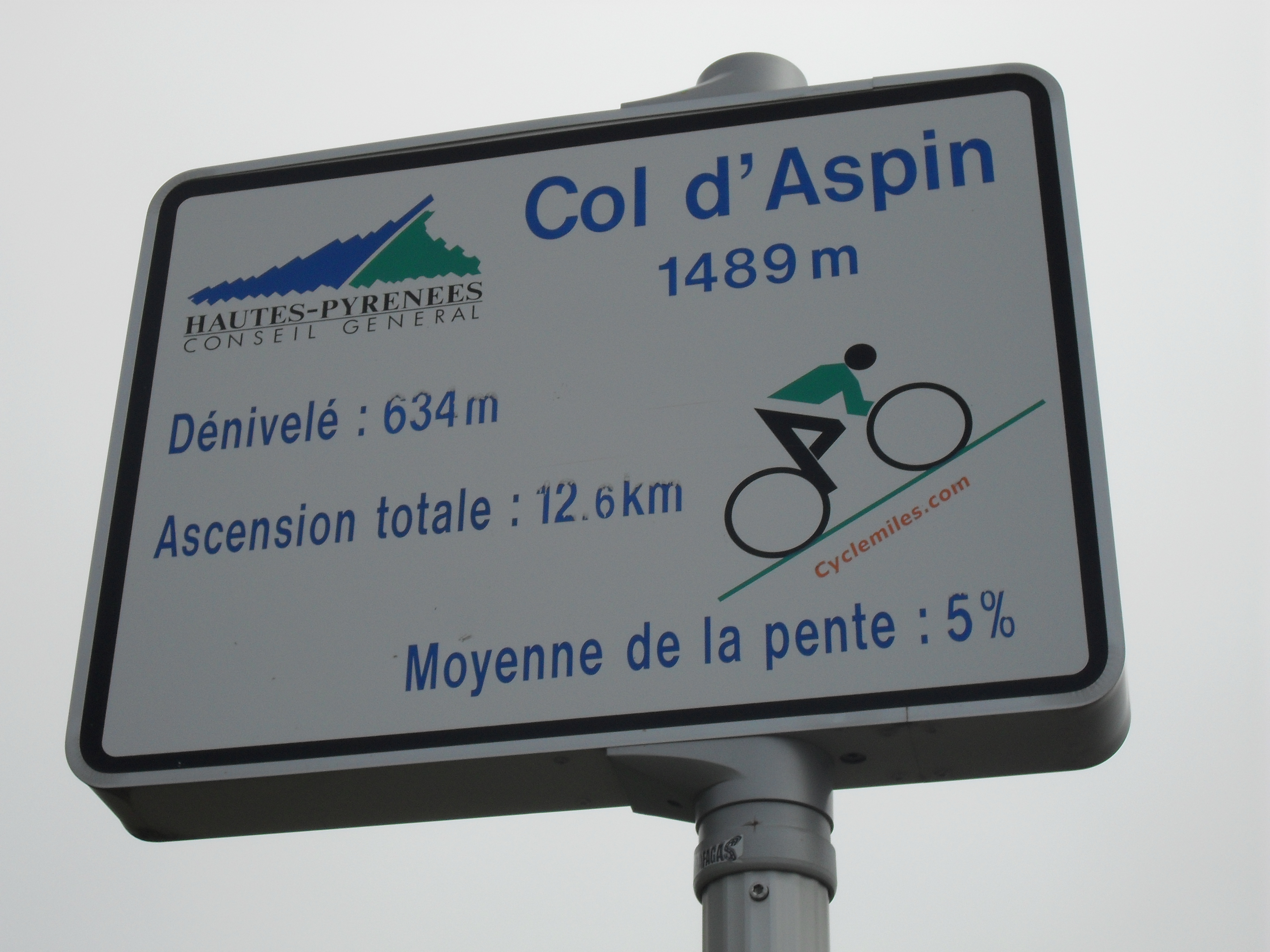
Signpost at the summit providing information about the ascent from Sainte-Marie-de-Campan

From Sainte-Marie-de-Campan (west), the ascent is 12.59 km (7.82 mi) in length, gaining 642 m (2,106 ft) in height, at an average of 5%. In comparison with its neighbour, the Col du Tourmalet, this is considered an "easy" climb, with only the last five kilometres, at about 8%, being difficult.

From Arreau (east), the climb is more difficult; over 12.0 km (7.5 mi) the climb averages 6.5%, gaining 779 m (2,556 ft) in height, with maximum gradient of 9.5%.

On both sides of the Col de l'Aspin mountain pass cycling milestones are placed every kilometre. They indicate the height of the summit, the distance to the summit, the current height, and the average slope in the following kilometre. Such signposting for cyclists has become common in most major mountain passes in the French Pyrenees and Alps.

== Tour de France ==
The pass has been part of the Tour de France 71 times, largely because it is the middle link in a chain of three road climbs, the other links being the Col du Tourmalet (2,115 m (6,939 ft)) and Col de Peyresourde (1,569 m (5,148 ft)). The first time the Col d'Aspin was crossed was in 1910, when the leader over the summit was Octave Lapize.

In the 1950 Tour, there was an altercation at the pass, with bottles and stones being thrown at the riders, and the Italian team with Gino Bartali and Fiorenzo Magni, the leaders at the time, withdrew from the Tour at the end of the stage from Pau to Saint-Gaudens.

=== Appearances in Tour de France since 1947 ===
Year	Stage	Category	Start	Finish	Leader at the summit
1947	15	1	Bagnères-de-Luchon	Pau	Jean Robic (FRA)
1948	8	2	Lourdes	Toulouse	Jean Robic (FRA)
1949	11	2	Pau	Bagnères-de-Luchon	Apo Lazaridès (FRA)
1950	11	2	Pau	Saint-Gaudens	Kléber Piot (FRA)
1951	14	2	Tarbes	Bagnères-de-Luchon	Fausto Coppi (ITA)
1952	17	2	Toulouse	Bagnères-de-Bigorre	Raphaël Géminiani (FRA)
1953	11	2	Cauterets	Bagnères-de-Luchon	Jean Robic (FRA)
1954	12	2	Pau	Bagnères-de-Luchon	Louison Bobet (FRA)
1955	17	2	Toulouse	Saint-Gaudens	Charly Gaul (LUX)
1956	12	2	Pau	Bagnères-de-Luchon	Nino Defilippis (ITA)
1958	14	2	Pau	Bagnères-de-Luchon	Federico Bahamontes (ESP)
1959	11	2	Bagnères-de-Bigorre	Saint-Gaudens	Jean Dotto (FRA)
1960	11	2	Pau	Bagnères-de-Luchon	Kurt Gimmi (SUI)
1961	17	2	Bagnères-de-Luchon	Pau	Marcel Queheille (FRA)
1962	12	3	Pau	Saint-Gaudens	Federico Bahamontes (ESP)
1963	11	2	Bagnères-de-Bigorre	Bagnères-de-Luchon	Guy Ignolin (FRA)
1964	16	2	Bagnères-de-Luchon	Pau	Julio Jiménez (ESP)
1969	17	2	La Mongie	Mourenx	Joaquim Galera (ESP)
1970	18	1	Saint-Gaudens	La Mongie	Primo Mori (ITA)
1971	16A	2	Bagnères-de-Luchon	Gourette–les-Eaux-Bonnes	Lucien Van Impe (BEL)
1972	8	2	Pau	Bagnères-de-Luchon	Roger Swerts (BEL)
1973	14	2	Bagnères-de-Luchon	Pau	José Manuel Fuente (ESP)
1974	17	2	Saint-Lary-Soulan	La Mongie	Jean-Pierre Danguillaume (FRA)
1975	11	2	Pau	Saint-Lary-Soulan–Pla d'Adet	Lucien Van Impe (BEL)
1976	15	2	Saint-Lary-Soulan	Pau	Gerben Karstens (NED)
1977	2	2	Auch	Pau	Luis Balagué (ESP)
1978	11	2	Pau	Saint-Lary-Soulan–Pla d'Adet	Michel Laurent (FRA)
1979	3	1	Bagnères-de-Luchon	Pau	René Bittinger (FRA)
1980	13	1	Pau	Bagnères-de-Luchon	Raymond Martin (FRA)
1982	13	1	Pau	Saint-Lary-Soulan–Pla d'Adet	Michel Laurent (FRA)
1983	10	1	Pau	Bagnères-de-Luchon	Patrocinio Jiménez (COL)
1985	17	2	Toulouse	Luz-Ardiden	José Del Ramo (ESP)
1986	13	1	Pau	Superbagnères	Dominique Arnaud (FRA)
1988	15	1	Saint-Girons	Luz-Ardiden	Samuel Cabrera (COL)
1989	10	2	Cauterets	Superbagnères	Robert Millar (GBR)
1990	16	1	Blagnac	Luz-Ardiden	Claudio Chiappucci (ITA)
1991	13	2	Jaca	Val-Louron	Claudio Chiappucci (ITA)
1994	12	1	Lourdes	Luz-Ardiden	Richard Virenque (FRA)
1995	15	1	Saint-Girons	Cauterets–Crêtes du Lys	Richard Virenque (FRA)
1997	9	2	Pau	Loudenvielle	Pascal Hervé (FRA)
1998	10	1	Pau	Bagnères-de-Luchon	Rodolfo Massi (ITA)
1999	16	1	Lannemezan	Pau	Mariano Piccoli (ITA)
2001	14	1	Tarbes	Luz-Ardiden	Bobby Julich (USA)
2003	15	1	Bagnères-de-Bigorre	Luz-Ardiden	Sylvain Chavanel (FRA)
2004	12	1	Castelsarrasin	La Mongie	Michael Rasmussen (DEN)
2006	11	1	Tarbes	Val d'Aran–Pla-de-Beret	Fabian Wegmann (DEU)
2008	9	1	Toulouse	Bagnères-de-Bigorre	Sebastian Lang (DEU)
2009	9	1	Saint-Gaudens	Tarbes	~~Franco Pellizotti (ITA)~~
2010	16	1	Bagnères-de-Luchon	Pau	Anthony Charteau (FRA)
2012	16	1	Pau	Bagnères-de-Luchon	Thomas Voeckler (FRA)
2015	11	1	Pau	Cauterets	Dan Martin (IRL)
2016	7	1	L'Isle-Jourdain	Lac de Payolle	Steve Cummings (GBR)
2018	19	1	Lourdes	Laruns	Julian Alaphilippe (FRA)
2022	17	1	Saint-Gaudens	Peyragudes	Thibaut Pinot (FRA)
2023	6	1	Tarbes	Cauterets–Cambasque	Neilson Powless (USA)
2026	6	1	Pau	Gavarnie-Gèdre	Lenny Martinez (FRA)

== Tour de France Femmes ==
Year	Stage	Category	Start	Finish	Leader at the summit
2023	7	1	Lannemezan	Tourmalet Bagnères-de-Bigorre	Katarzyna Niewiadoma (POL)
