= Port del Cantó =

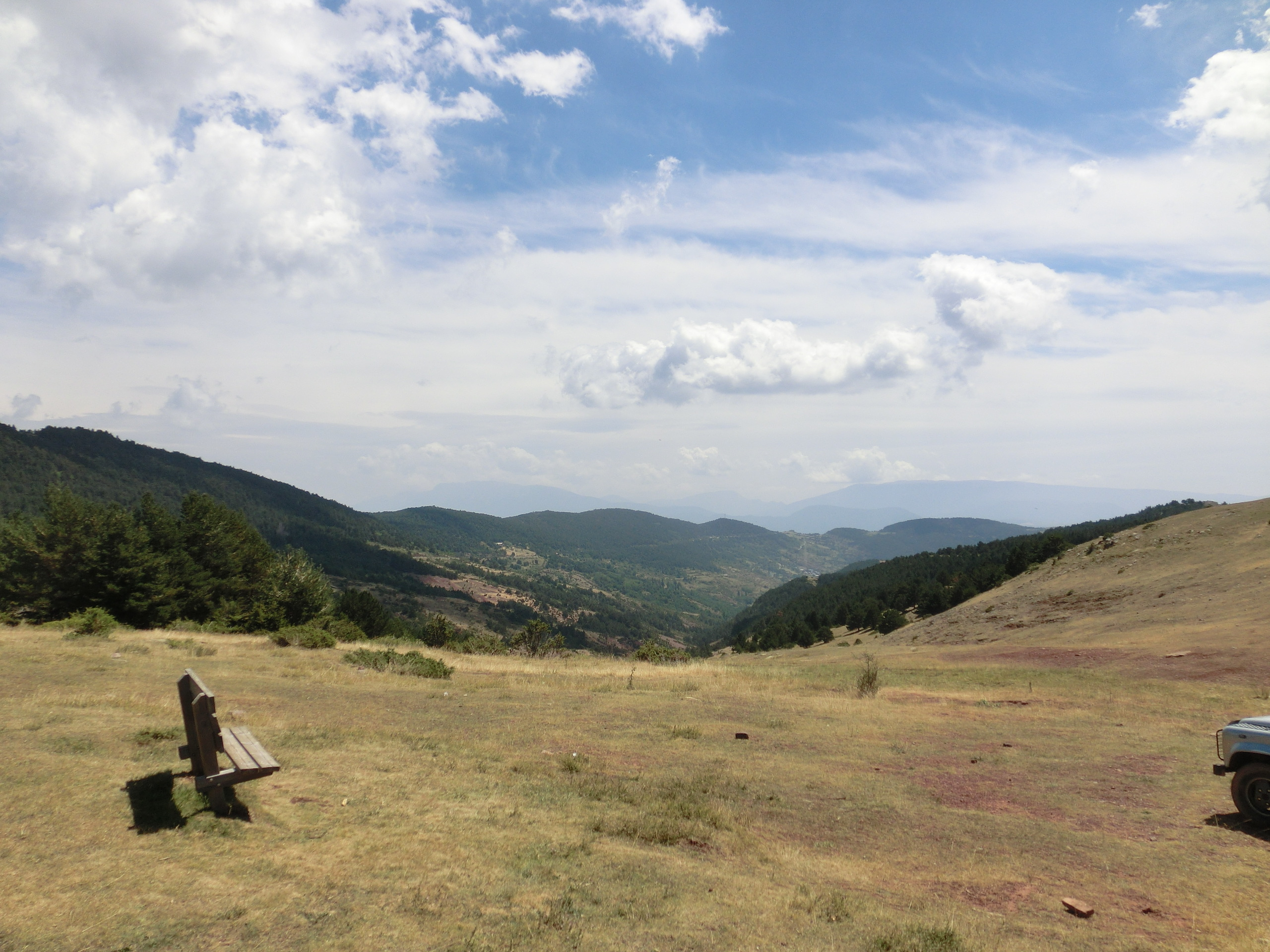
- A view from the summit of the Port del Cantó

- Location within Catalonia
- Elevation: 1,730 metres (5,680 ft)

Third Approach
- Range: Pyrenees
- Coordinates: 42°22′17.20″N 1°14′20.23″E

The Port del Cantó, or Coll del Cantó or Coll de la Pedra del Cantó, is a mountain pass at an altitude of 1,730 metres (5,680 ft) located at the border of the municipalities of Soriguera, in the comarca of Pallars Sobirà, and Montferrer i Castellbò in the comarca of Alt Urgell in Catalonia, Spain.

The pass is located at kilometre 260 of the N-260 road.

It is on the ridge which connects the Serra Seca, to the north, with the Serrat de Pratprimer to the south.

Distance to the top of the port is 28.8 km. Slope for emergency is 1073m, 4.3%. Western slope starts from sort and is 1038m,5.3%.

== Tour de France ==
The route, from the western side, was used on Stage 9 of the 2016 Tour de France.

=== Appearances in the Tour de France ===
Year	Stage	Category	Start	Finish	Leader at the summit
2016	9	1	Vielha Val d'Aran	Andorre Arcalis	Thomas de Gendt (BEL)
1993	16	2	Andorre	Saint-Lary-Soulan Pla d'Adet	Toni Rominger (SUI)
1974	16	2	Seo de Urgel	Saint-Lary-Soulan Pla d'Adet	Domingo Perurena (ESP)
