= Lac de Payolle =

Lake in the French Pyrenees

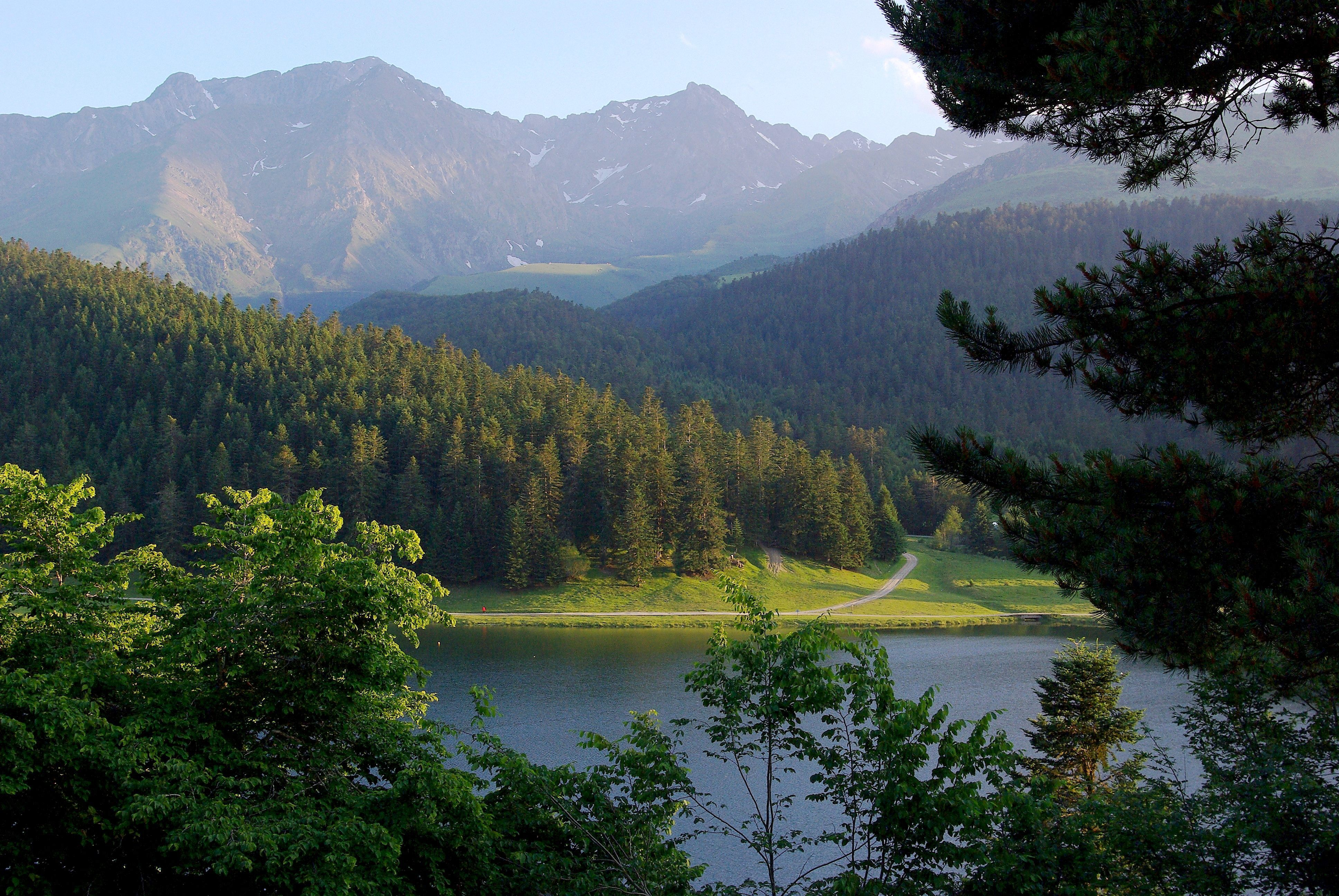
- The Lac de Payolle in 2009

- Map of the Pyrenees showing the location of Lac de Payolle
- Location: Hautes-Pyrénées, France
- Coordinates: 42°56′04″N 00°17′50″E
- Surface area: 10.1 ha (25 acres)
- Surface elevation: 1,139 m (3,737 ft)

The Lac de Payolle is an artificial lake in the French Pyrenees. It is located in the communes of Campan and Arreau of the Hautes-Pyrénées department in the Midi-Pyrénées region. Its western shore is the boundary between the communes of Ancizan and Arreau. It is usually completely frozen in winter.

== Geography ==
It is located at the foot of the Col d'Aspin at 1,139 m (3,737 ft) altitude. With an area of 10 ha (25 acres), it is filled by three mountain streams.

== Tourism ==
The lake is an important tourist resort centre: Payolle ski resort, where various activities are practiced such as mountain biking, orienteering, cross-country skiing, snowshoeing, dog sleds, horse or pony rides, paragliding, hiking, etc.

On the lake, fishing is practiced. A tourist fishing route was also laid out around the lake with gateways for fisherman, but also various watersports such as canoeing and sailing.

== Sport ==
Stage 7 of the 2016 Tour de France will finish at the lake on 8 July 2016.

== See also ==
- List of lakes of Hautes-Pyrénées
- List of lakes of the Pyrénées
- Col d'Aspin
