= Bordes, Hautes-Pyrénées =

Bordes
- Commune
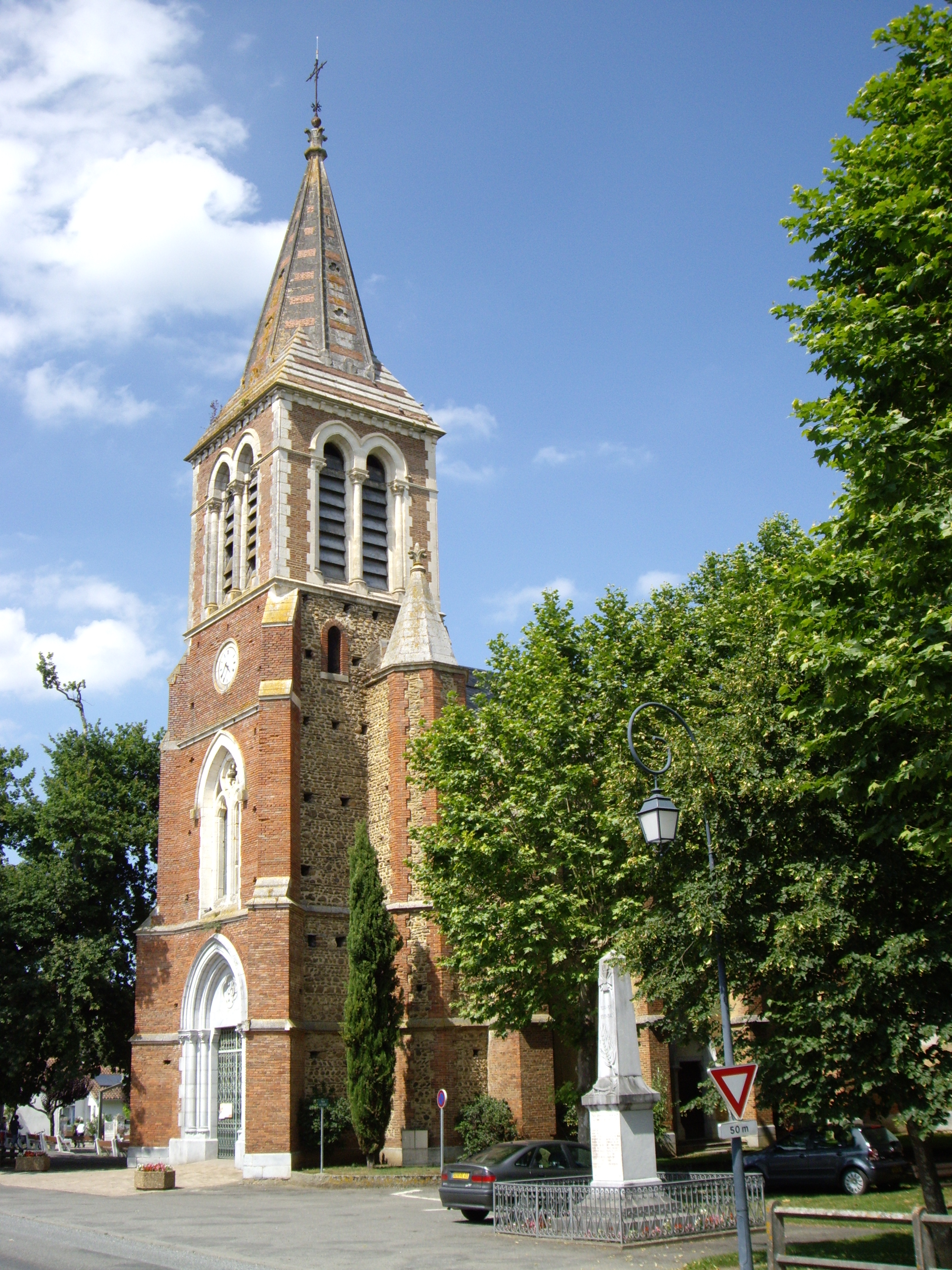
- Church of St. Christopher

- Coat of arms
- Location of Bordes
- Location within France Location within Occitanie
- Coordinates: 43°12′12″N 0°13′35″E
- Country: France
- Region: Occitania
- Department: Hautes-Pyrénées
- Arrondissement: Tarbes
- Canton: La Vallée de l'Arros et des Baïses

Government
  - Mayor (2020–2026): Jean-Paul Broueilh
- Area^{1}: 11.22 km^{2} (4.33 sq mi)
- Elevation: 275 m (902 ft)
- Highest elevation: 459 m (1,506 ft)
- Lowest elevation: 242 m (794 ft)
- Population (2023): 752
  - Density: 67.0/km^{2} (174/sq mi)
- Time zone: UTC+01:00 (CET)
  - Summer (DST): UTC+02:00 (CEST)
- INSEE/Postal code: 65101 /65190
- ^{1} French Land Register data, which excludes lakes, ponds, glaciers > 1 km^{2} (0.386 sq mi or 247 acres) and river estuaries.

Bordes (French pronunciation: [bɔʁd]; Occitan: Bòrdas) is a commune in the Hautes-Pyrénées department in southwestern France.

== Population ==
Historical population
Year	Pop.	±% p.a.
1968	540	—
1975	538	−0.05%
1982	493	−1.24%
1990	522	+0.72%
1999	556	+0.70%
2007	627	+1.51%
2012	772	+4.25%
2017	762	−0.26%
2023	752	−0.22%
Source: INSEE

== See also ==
- Communes of the Hautes-Pyrénées department
