= Guillestre =

- Commune
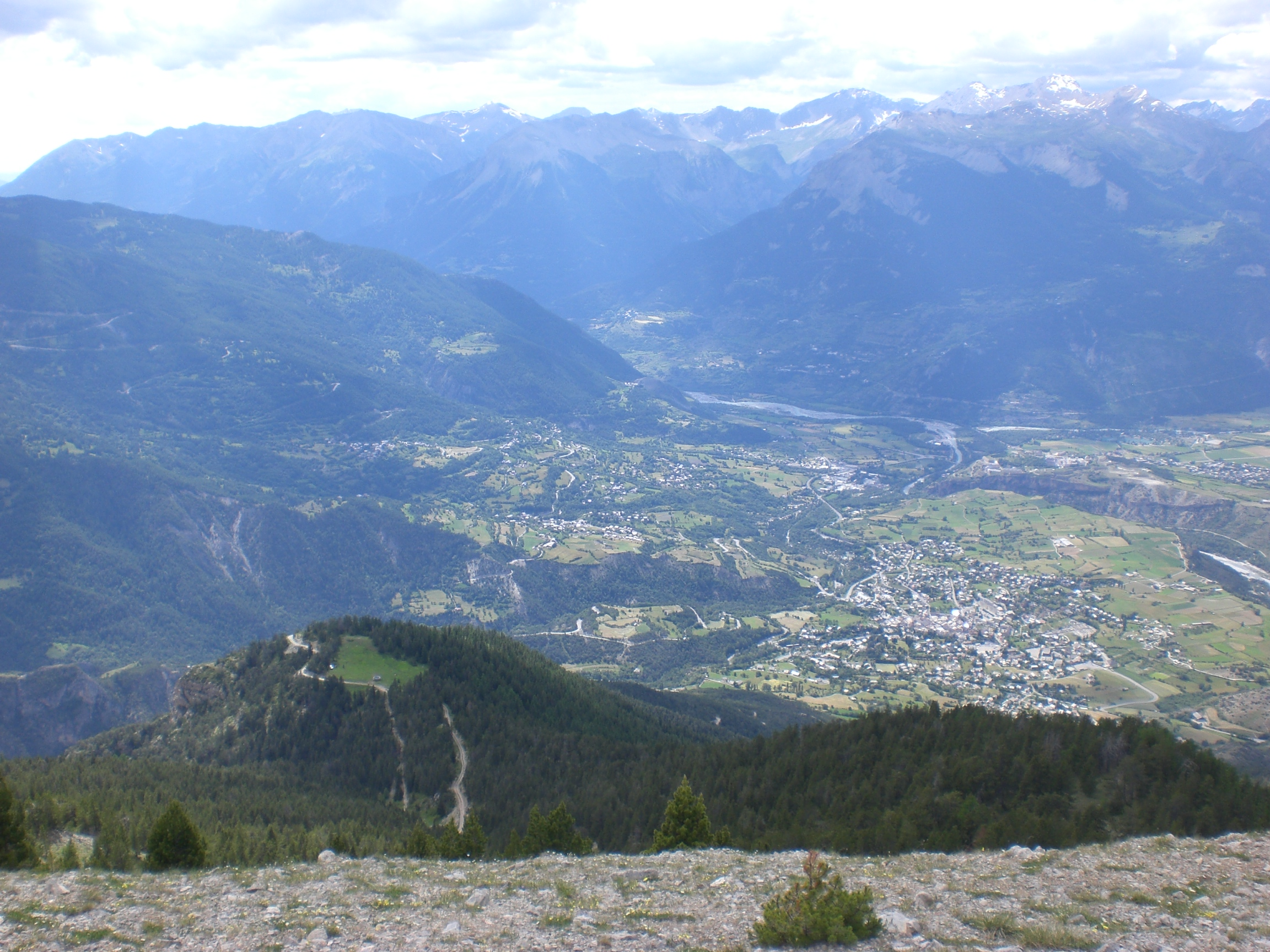
- A panoramic view of Guillestre to the right, and the village of Risoul, left

- Coat of arms
- Location of Guillestre
- Location within France Location within Provence-Alpes-Côte d'Azur
- Coordinates: 44°40′N 6°39′E
- Country: France
- Region: Provence-Alpes-Côte d'Azur
- Department: Hautes-Alpes
- Arrondissement: Briançon
- Canton: Guillestre

Government
  - Mayor (2026–32): Emmanuel Molle
- Area^{1}: 51.29 km^{2} (19.80 sq mi)
- Elevation: 1,050 m (3,440 ft)
- Highest elevation: 2,694 m (8,839 ft)
- Lowest elevation: 867 m (2,844 ft)
- Population (2023): 2,295
  - Density: 44.75/km^{2} (115.9/sq mi)
- Time zone: UTC+01:00 (CET)
  - Summer (DST): UTC+02:00 (CEST)
- INSEE/Postal code: 05065 /05600
- ^{1} French Land Register data, which excludes lakes, ponds, glaciers > 1 km^{2} (0.386 sq mi or 247 acres) and river estuaries.

Guillestre (French pronunciation: [ɡijɛstʁ]; Vivaro-Alpine: Guilhèstra) is a commune in the Hautes-Alpes department in southeastern France.

== Geography ==
The village lies in the northwestern part of the commune, on the left bank of the Chagné, a stream, tributary of the Guil, which forms all of the commune's northern border, before flowing into the Durance, which forms part of the commune's western border. The village also lies high within the alps of France.

== Population ==
Historical population
Year	Pop.	±% p.a.
1968	1,479	—
1975	1,466	−0.13%
1982	1,937	+4.06%
1990	2,000	+0.40%
1999	2,211	+1.12%
2007	2,273	+0.35%
2012	2,367	+0.81%
2017	2,344	−0.20%
2023	2,295	−0.35%
Source: INSEE

== See also ==
- Communes of the Hautes-Alpes department
