= Neste (river) =

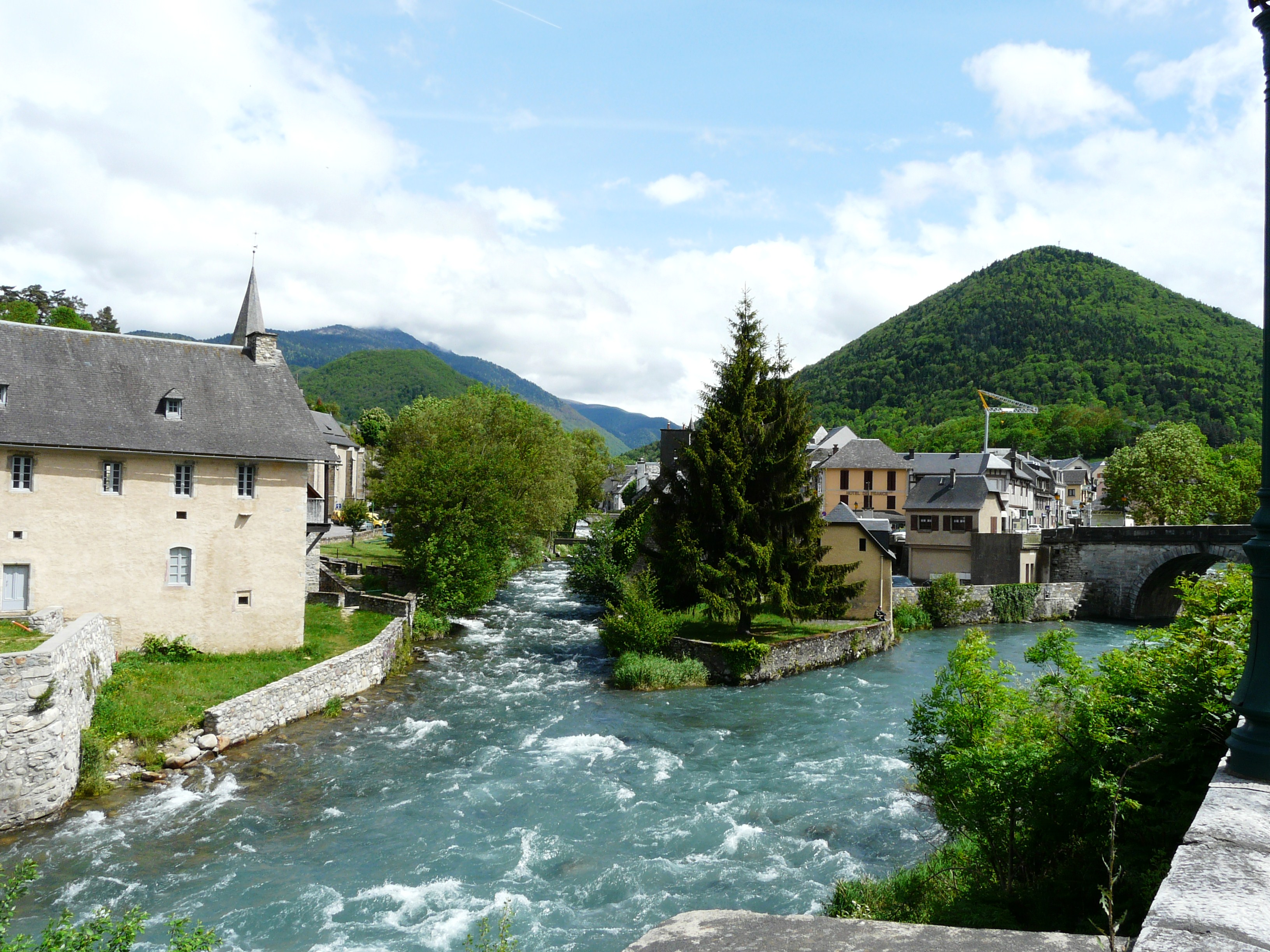
- La Neste d'Aure (right) and la Neste du Louron (left) join to form la Neste, at Arreau.

- Location within France Location within Occitanie

Location
- Country: France

Physical characteristics
- Source
  - location: Pyrenees
- Mouth
  - location: Garonne
  - coordinates: 43°4′31″N 0°33′57″E
- Length: 73 km (45 mi)
- Basin size: 906 km^{2} (350 sq mi)
- Discharge
  - average: 13 m^{3}/s (460 cu ft/s)

Basin features
- Progression: Garonne→ Gironde estuary→ Atlantic Ocean

The Neste (French pronunciation: [nɛst]; Occitan: Nestés) is a river in southern France, a left tributary of the Garonne. It is 73.1 km (45.4 mi) long. It rises from several sources around Saint-Lary-Soulan, central Pyrenees and flows through the following departments and towns:

- Hautes-Pyrénées: Saint-Lary-Soulan, Arreau, La Barthe-de-Neste
- Haute-Garonne: Montréjeau

Two rivers, the Neste d'Aure and the Neste du Louron, join to form the Neste at Arreau. The Neste flows into the Garonne in Montréjeau.
