= Plavilla =

Commune in Occitanie, France

- Commune
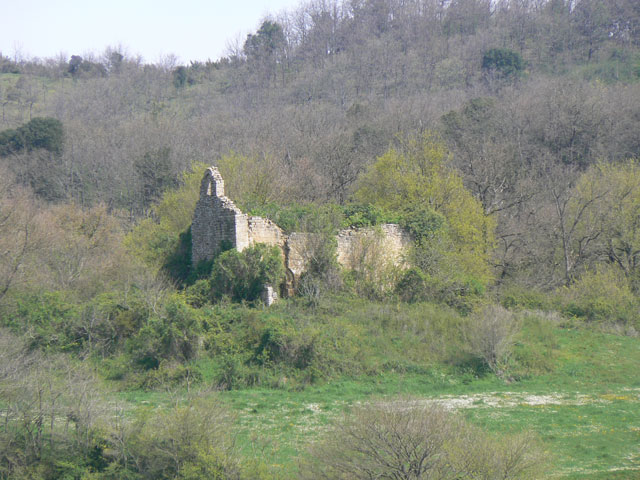
- The Espinoux church in Plavilla

- Coat of arms
- Location of Plavilla
- Location within France Location within Occitanie
- Coordinates: 43°08′52″N 1°54′51″E
- Country: France
- Region: Occitania
- Department: Aude
- Arrondissement: Carcassonne
- Canton: La Piège au Razès

Government
  - Mayor (2020–2026): Francis Andrieu
- Area^{1}: 12.4 km^{2} (4.8 sq mi)
- Elevation: 539 m (1,768 ft)
- Highest elevation: 483 m (1,585 ft)
- Lowest elevation: 307 m (1,007 ft)
- Population (2023): 146
  - Density: 11.8/km^{2} (30.5/sq mi)
- Time zone: UTC+01:00 (CET)
  - Summer (DST): UTC+02:00 (CEST)
- INSEE/Postal code: 11291 /11270
- ^{1} French Land Register data, which excludes lakes, ponds, glaciers > 1 km^{2} (0.386 sq mi or 247 acres) and river estuaries.

Plavilla (French pronunciation: [plavila]; Occitan: Planvialar) is a commune in the Aude department in southern France.

== Population ==
Historical population
Year	Pop.	±% p.a.
1968	55	—
1975	71	+3.72%
1982	54	−3.83%
1990	66	+2.54%
1999	104	+5.18%
2007	112	+0.93%
2012	122	+1.73%
2017	110	−2.05%
2023	146	+4.83%
Source: INSEE

== See also ==
- Communes of the Aude department
