= La Barthe-de-Neste =

- Commune
- Coat of arms
- Location of La Barthe-de-Neste
- Location within France Location within Occitanie
- Coordinates: 43°04′50″N 0°23′03″E
- Country: France
- Region: Occitania
- Department: Hautes-Pyrénées
- Arrondissement: Bagnères-de-Bigorre
- Canton: Neste, Aure et Louron

Government
  - Mayor (2020–2026): Philippe Solaz
- Area^{1}: 7.62 km^{2} (2.94 sq mi)
- Elevation: 500 m (1,600 ft)
- Highest elevation: 658 m (2,159 ft)
- Lowest elevation: 516 m (1,693 ft)
- Population (2023): 1,240
  - Density: 163/km^{2} (421/sq mi)
- Time zone: UTC+01:00 (CET)
  - Summer (DST): UTC+02:00 (CEST)
- INSEE/Postal code: 65069 /65250
- ^{1} French Land Register data, which excludes lakes, ponds, glaciers > 1 km^{2} (0.386 sq mi or 247 acres) and river estuaries.

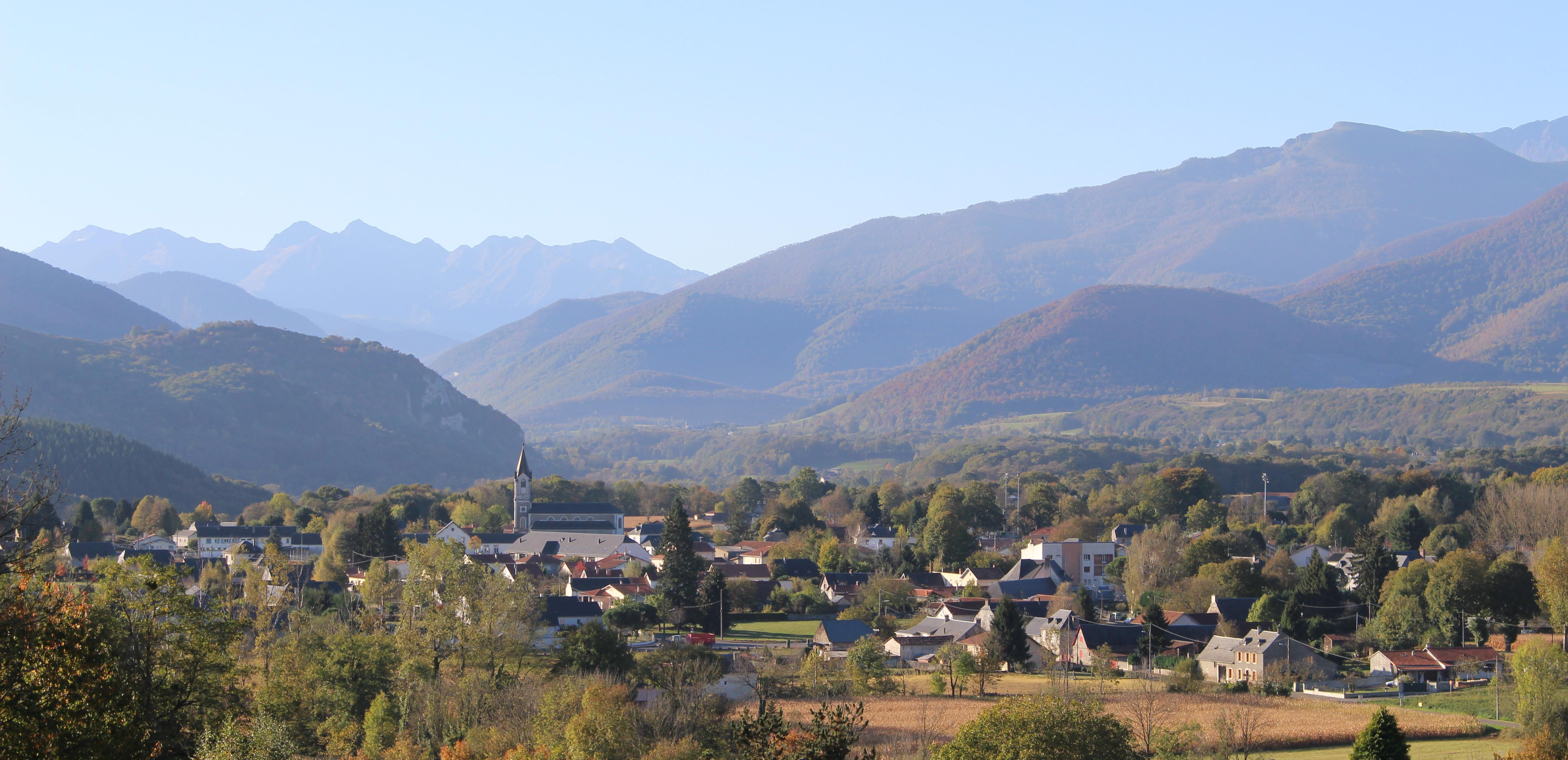
La Barthe-de-Neste (Hautes-Pyrénées)

La Barthe-de-Neste (French pronunciation: [la baʁt də nɛst], literally La Barthe of Neste; Occitan: La Barta) is a commune in the Hautes-Pyrénées department in southwestern France.

== Population ==
Historical population
Year	Pop.	±% p.a.
1968	1,336	—
1975	1,364	+0.30%
1982	1,137	−2.57%
1990	1,086	−0.57%
1999	1,056	−0.31%
2007	1,158	+1.16%
2012	1,189	+0.53%
2017	1,227	+0.63%
2023	1,240	+0.18%
Source: INSEE

== See also ==
- Communes of the Hautes-Pyrénées department
