= Col de Peyresourde =

Mountain pass in France

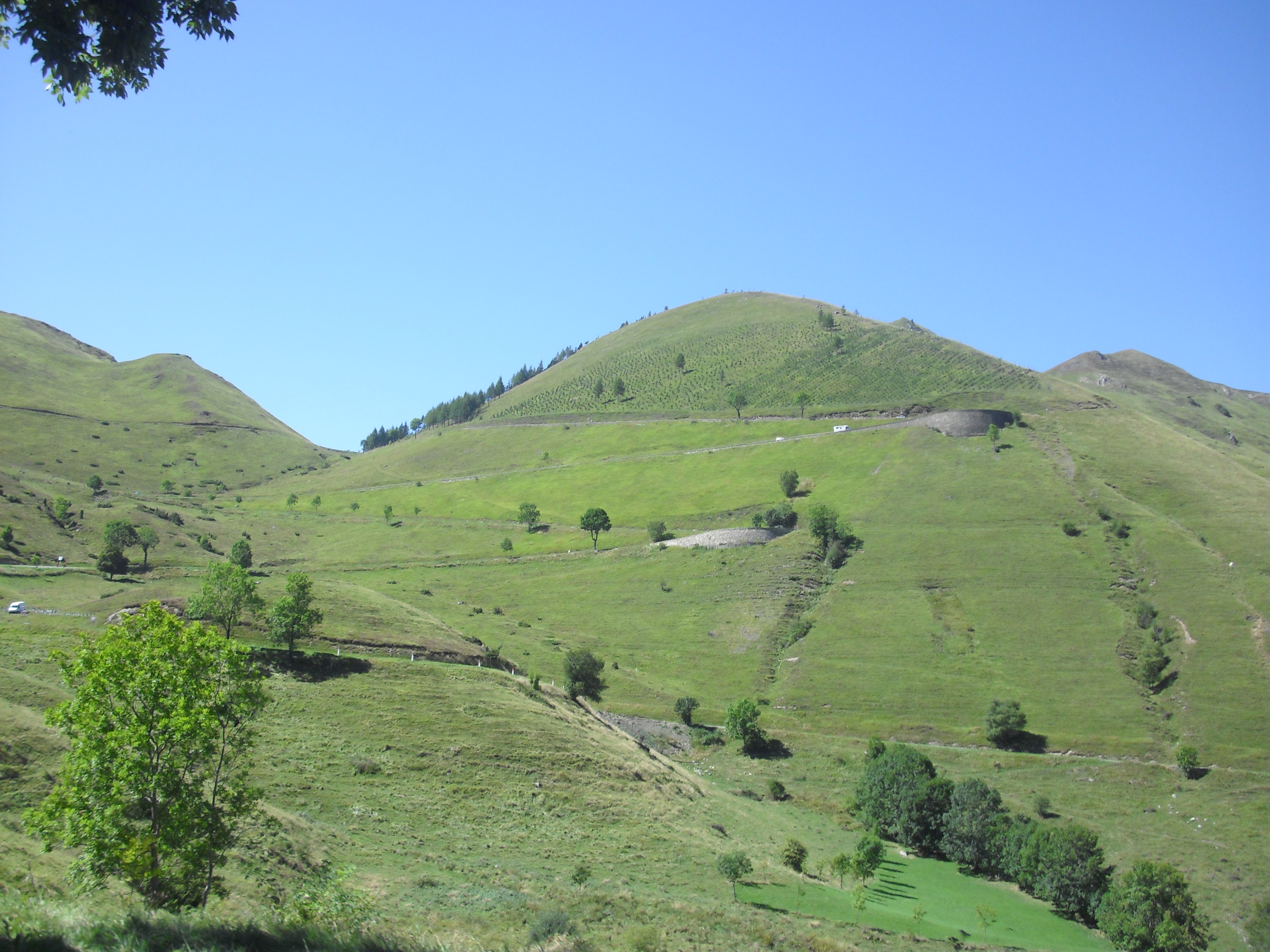
- The eastern approach to the Col de Peyresourde

- Location within Pyrenees
- Elevation: 1,569 m (5,148 ft)
- Traversed by: D618

Third Approach
- Location: Haute-Garonne/Hautes-Pyrénées, France
- Range: Pyrenees
- Coordinates: 42°48′08″N 0°27′46″E

The Col de Peyresourde (Occitan: Còth de Pèira Sorda) (elevation 1,569 m (5,148 ft)) is a mountain pass in the central Pyrenees on the border of the department of Haute-Garonne and Hautes-Pyrénées in France. It is situated on the D618 road between Bagnères-de-Luchon and Arreau.

== Details of climb ==
Starting from Bagnères-de-Luchon (east), the Col de Peyresourde is 13.8 km (8.6 mi) long. Over this distance, the climb is 949 m (3,114 ft) (an average gradient of 6.9%). The steepest sections are 11.7%. No mountain pass cycling milestones for cyclists are placed on this side of the climb. Only close to Bagnères-de-Luchon and 3 kilometres from the summit signposts inform about the overall climb.

Starting from Armenteule (west), the climb is 8.3 km (5.2 mi) long. Over this distance, the climb is 629 m (2,064 ft) (an average gradient of 7.6%). On this side mountain pass cycling milestones for cyclists are placed every kilometre. They indicate the current height, the distance to the summit, and the average slope in the following passage.

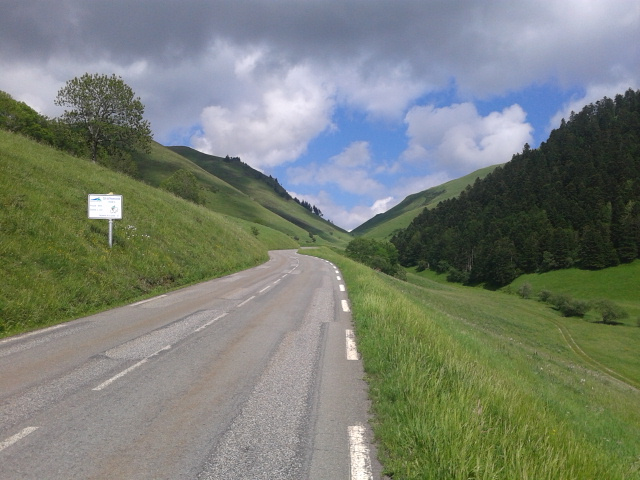
View on the last two kilometres in the climb from Armenteule

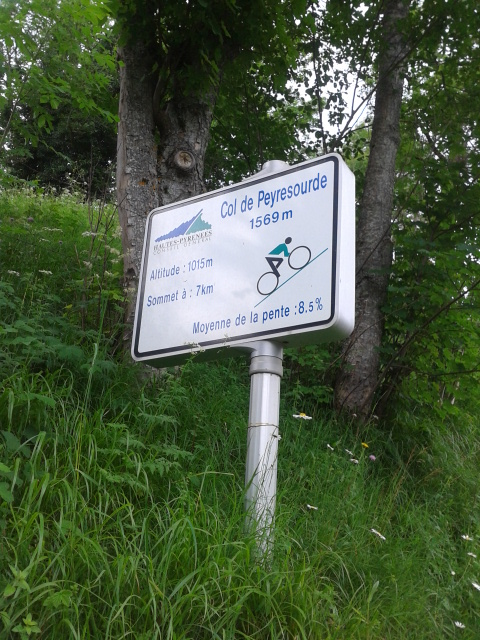
One of the mountain pass cycling milestones at the climb from Armenteule

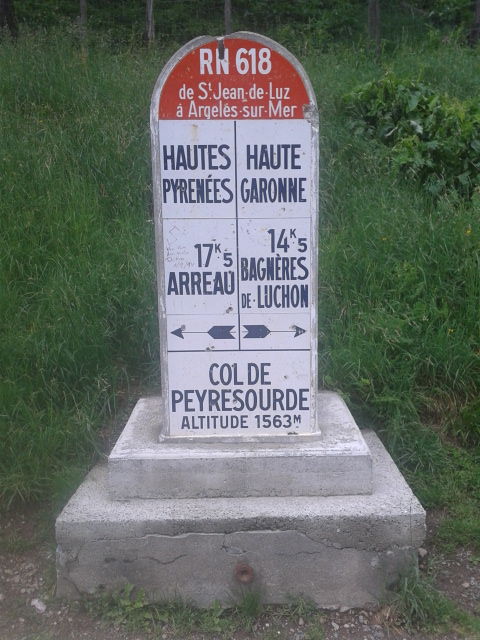
Sign at the summit showing that the pass is on the border of the department of Haute-Garonne and Hautes-Pyrénées

== Tour de France ==
The Col de Peyresourde was first used in the Tour de France in 1910 and has appeared frequently since. The leader over the summit in 1910 was Octave Lapize.

In 2007, the Tour de France crossed the Col de Peyresourde on stage 15, joining the climb at Saint-Aventin (5.5 km from Bagnères de Luchon) after descending from the Port de Balès. This stage was selected for the 2007 L'Étape du Tour, in which amateur and club riders ride over a full stage of the tour.

The col was crossed twice in the 2012 Tour de France, firstly on Stage 16 from Pau to Bagnères-de-Luchon, when it was ranked a Category 1 climb, and again on the following day, when it was unranked, with the stage continuing on to the ski station at nearby Peyragudes. It was used again in the 2016 Tour de France on Stage 8, from Pau to Bagnères-de-Luchon, which saw eventual race winner Chris Froome make a daring descent attack from the top of the Col that caught many of his main rivals off guard, resulting in a solo stage victory.

=== Appearances in Tour de France (since 1947) ===
Year	Stage	Category	Start	Finish	Leader at the summit
2025	14	1	Pau	Superbagneres	Thymen Arensman (NED)
2024	15	1	Loudenvielle	Plateau de Beille	David Gaudu (FRA)
2021	17	1	Muret	Saint-Lary-Soulan Col de Portet	Anthony Turgis (FRA)
2020	8	1	Cazères	Loudenvielle	Nans Peters (FRA)
2018	17	Not categorised	Bagnères-de-Luchon	Saint-Lary-Soulan Col de Portet	Tanel Kangert (EST)
2017	12	1	Pau	Peyragudes	Mikel Nieve (ESP)
2016	8	1	Pau	Bagnères-de-Luchon	Chris Froome (GBR)
2014	17	1	Saint-Gaudens	Pla d'Adet	Vasil Kiryienka (BLR)
2013	9	1	Saint-Girons	Bagnères-de-Bigorre	Thomas De Gendt (BEL)
2012	17	Not categorised	Bagnères-de-Luchon	Peyragudes	Alejandro Valverde (ESP)
2012	16	1	Pau	Bagnères-de-Luchon	Thomas Voeckler (FRA)
2010	16	1	Bagnères-de-Luchon	Pau	Sylwester Szmyd (POL)
2008	9	1	Toulouse	Bagnères-de-Bigorre	Sebastian Lang (DEU)
2007	15	1	Foix	Loudenvielle	~~Alexander Vinokourov (KAZ)~~
2006	11	1	Tarbes	Pla-de-Beret	David de la Fuente (ESP)
2005	15	1	Lézat-sur-Lèze	Pla d'Adet	Laurent Brochard (FRA)
2003	14	1	Saint-Girons	Loudenvielle	Gilberto Simoni (ITA)
2001	13	1	Foix	Pla d'Adet	Laurent Jalabert (FRA)
1999	15	1	Saint-Gaudens	Piau-Engaly	Alberto Elli (ITA)
1998	10	1	Pau	Bagnères-de-Luchon	Rodolfo Massi (ITA)
1995	15	1	Saint-Girons	Cauterets-Crêtes du Lys	Richard Virenque (FRA)
1994	12	1	Lourdes	Luz Ardiden	Roberto Torres (ESP)
1993	16	1	Andorra	Pla d'Adet	Claudio Chiappucci (ITA)
1989	10	1	Cauterets	Superbagnères	Robert Millar (GBR)
1988	15	1	Saint-Girons	Luz Ardiden	Steven Rooks (NED)
1986	13	1	Pau	Superbagnères	Bernard Hinault (FRA)
1983	10	1	Pau	Bagnères-de-Luchon	Robert Millar (GBR)
1981	6	1	Saint-Gaudens	Pla d'Adet	Bernard Hinault (FRA)
1980	13	1	Pau	Bagnères-de-Luchon	Raymond Martin (FRA)
1979	3	2	Bagnères-de-Luchon	Pau	Bernard Hinault (FRA)
1976	14	1	Saint-Gaudens	Pla d'Adet	Luis Ocaña (ESP)
1974	16	2	La Seu d'Urgell	Pla d'Adet	Vicente López Carril (ESP)
1972	8	2	Pau	Bagnères-de-Luchon	Lucien Van Impe (BEL)
1971	16a	2	Bagnères-de-Luchon	Gourette-Eaux-Bonnes	Lucien Van Impe (BEL)
1970	18	2	Saint-Gaudens	La Mongie	Raymond Delisle (FRA)
1969	17	2	La Mongie	Mourenx	Joaquim Galera (ESP)
1964	16	2	Bagnères-de-Luchon	Pau	Julio Jiménez (ESP)
1963	11	2	Bagnères-de-Bigorre	Bagnères-de-Luchon	Federico Bahamontes (ESP)
1962	12	2	Pau	Saint-Gaudens	Federico Bahamontes (ESP)
1961	17	2	Bagnères-de-Luchon	Pau	Imerio Massignan (ITA)
1960	11	1	Pau	Bagnères-de-Luchon	Kurt Gimmi (SUI)
1959	11	1	Bagnères-de-Bigorre	Saint-Gaudens	Valentin Huot (FRA)
1958	14	1	Pau	Bagnères-de-Luchon	Federico Bahamontes (ESP)
1956	12	Not categorised	Pau	Bagnères-de-Luchon	Jean-Pierre Schmitz (LUX)
1955	17	2	Toulouse	Saint-Gaudens	Charly Gaul (LUX)
1954	12	2	Pau	Bagnères-de-Luchon	Federico Bahamontes (ESP)
1953	11	2	Cauterets	Bagnères-de-Luchon	Jean Robic (FRA)
1952	17	2	Toulouse	Bagnères-de-Bigorre	Antonio Gelabert (ESP)
1951	14	2	Tarbes	Bagnères-de-Luchon	Fausto Coppi (ITA)
1949	11	2	Pau	Bagnères-de-Luchon	Jean Robic (FRA)
1948	8	2	Lourdes	Toulouse	Jean Robic (FRA)
1947	15	1	Bagnères-de-Luchon	Pau	Jean Robic (FRA)
