= Armenteule =

- Part of Loudenvielle
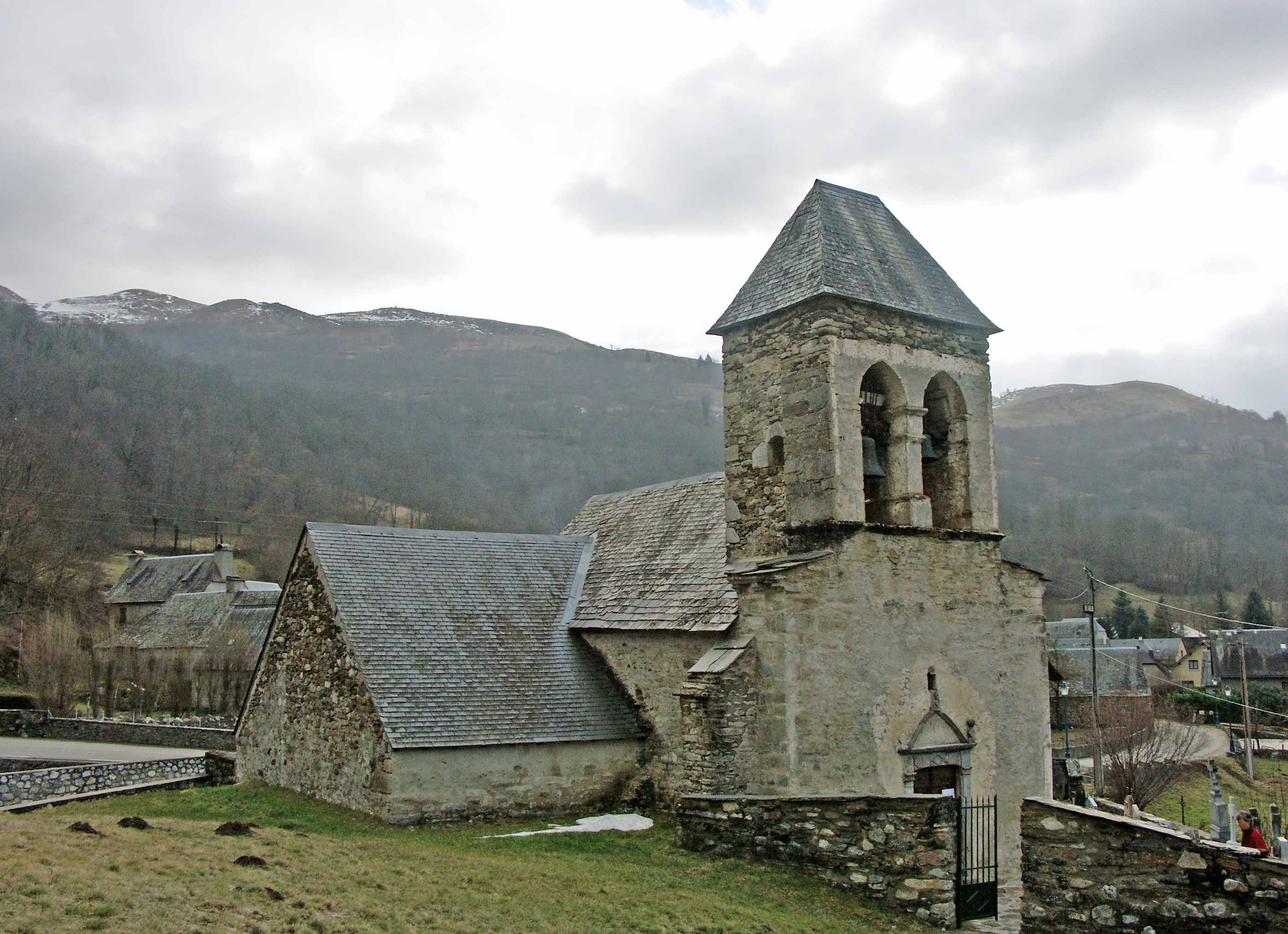
- The church of Saint Félix

- Coat of arms
- Location of Armenteule
- Location within France Location within Occitanie
- Coordinates: 42°48′58″N 0°24′52″E
- Country: France
- Region: Occitania
- Department: Hautes-Pyrénées
- Arrondissement: Bagnères-de-Bigorre
- Canton: Neste, Aure et Louron
- Commune: Loudenvielle
- Area^{1}: 0.7 km^{2} (0.27 sq mi)
- Elevation: 950 m (3,120 ft)
- Highest elevation: 1,061 m (3,481 ft)
- Lowest elevation: 933 m (3,061 ft)
- Population (2023): 65
  - Density: 93/km^{2} (240/sq mi)
- Time zone: UTC+01:00 (CET)
  - Summer (DST): UTC+02:00 (CEST)
- Postal code: 65510
- ^{1} French Land Register data, which excludes lakes, ponds, glaciers > 1 km^{2} (0.386 sq mi or 247 acres) and river estuaries.

Armenteule (French pronunciation: [aʁmɑ̃tœl]; Occitan: Armentèula) is a former commune in the Hautes-Pyrénées department in southwestern France. On 1 January 2016, it was merged into the commune of Loudenvielle.

== See also ==
- Communes of the Hautes-Pyrénées department
