= Loudenvielle =

- Commune
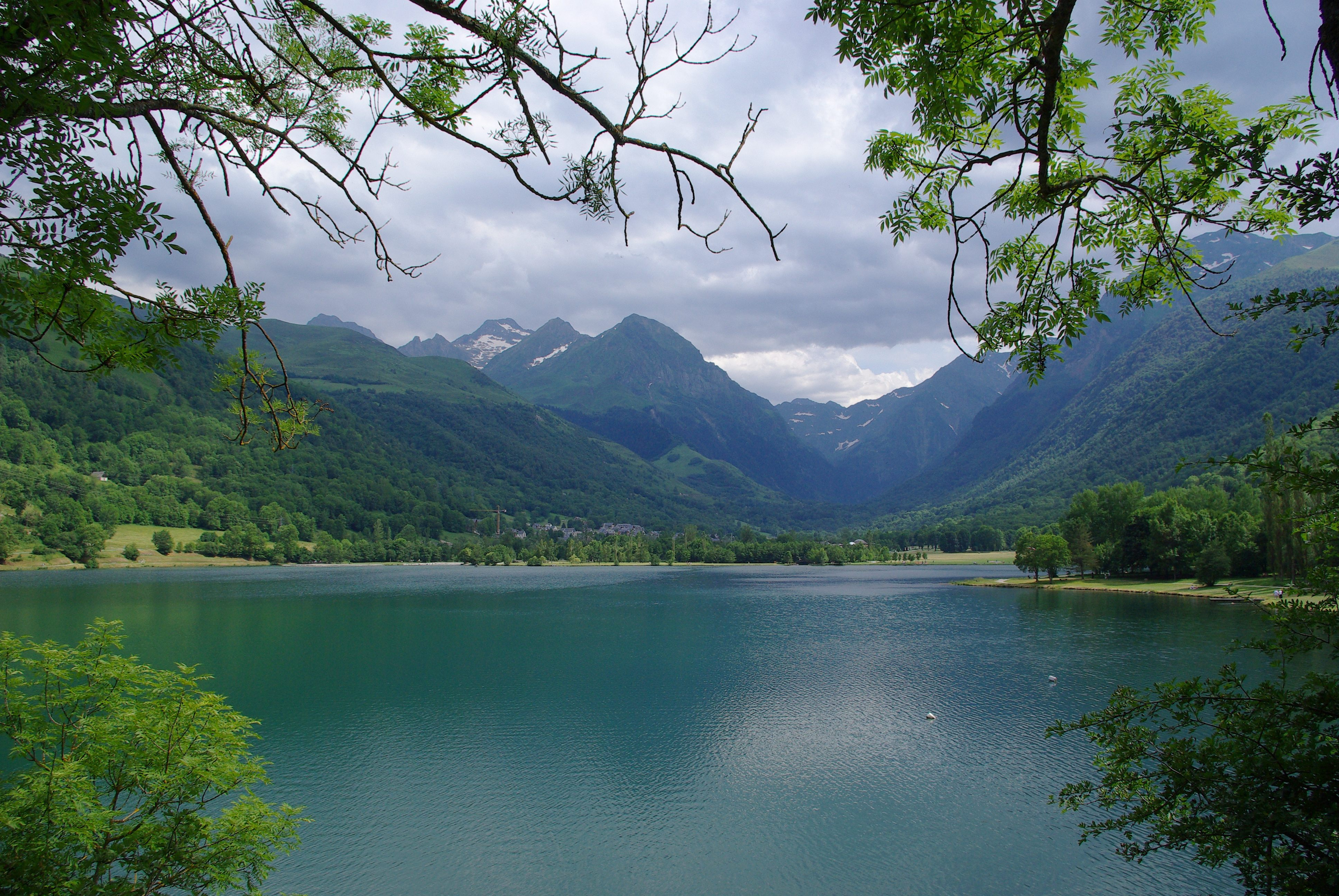
- Lake Génos-Loudenvielle seen from the north, with Loudenvielle across the lake

- Coat of arms
- Location of Loudenvielle
- Location within France Location within Occitanie
- Coordinates: 42°47′50″N 0°24′43″E
- Country: France
- Region: Occitania
- Department: Hautes-Pyrénées
- Arrondissement: Bagnères-de-Bigorre
- Canton: Neste, Aure et Louron
- Intercommunality: CC Aure Louron

Government
  - Mayor (2020–2026): Noël Lacaze
- Area^{1}: 43.35 km^{2} (16.74 sq mi)
- Elevation: 960 m (3,150 ft)
- Highest elevation: 3,130 m (10,270 ft)
- Lowest elevation: 956 m (3,136 ft)
- Population (2023): 374
  - Density: 8.63/km^{2} (22.3/sq mi)
- Time zone: UTC+01:00 (CET)
  - Summer (DST): UTC+02:00 (CEST)
- INSEE/Postal code: 65282 /65510
- ^{1} French Land Register data, which excludes lakes, ponds, glaciers > 1 km^{2} (0.386 sq mi or 247 acres) and river estuaries.

Loudenvielle (French pronunciation: [ludɑ̃vjɛl]; Occitan: Lodenvièla) is a commune in the Hautes-Pyrénées department in south-western France. On 1 January 2016, the former commune Armenteule was merged into Loudenvielle.

Its inhabitants are called Loudenviellois.

Located in the Louron Valley, Loudenvielle is a popular tourist resort, with a lake, campsite, thermal spa and waterpark. It is also the closest town to the Peyragudes and Val-Louron ski resorts.

It is situated at the foot of the Col de Peyresourde and has hosted three stage finishes in the Tour de France, including the finish of Stage 15 in 2007.

== Tour de France stage finishes ==
Year	Stage	Start of stage	Distance (km)	Stage winner	Yellow jersey
2020	8	Cazères-sur-Garonne	141	Nans Peters	Adam Yates
2007	15	Foix	196	Kim Kirchen	Michael Rasmussen
2003	14	Saint-Girons	192	Gilberto Simoni	~~Lance Armstrong~~
1997	9	Pau	182	Laurent Brochard	Cédric Vasseur

In the 2007 tour, the original stage winner was Alexander Vinokourov, but in April 2008 the win was credited to Kim Kirchen following Vinokourov's failing a drug test.

== See also ==
- Communes of the Hautes-Pyrénées department
