= Ancizan =

- Commune
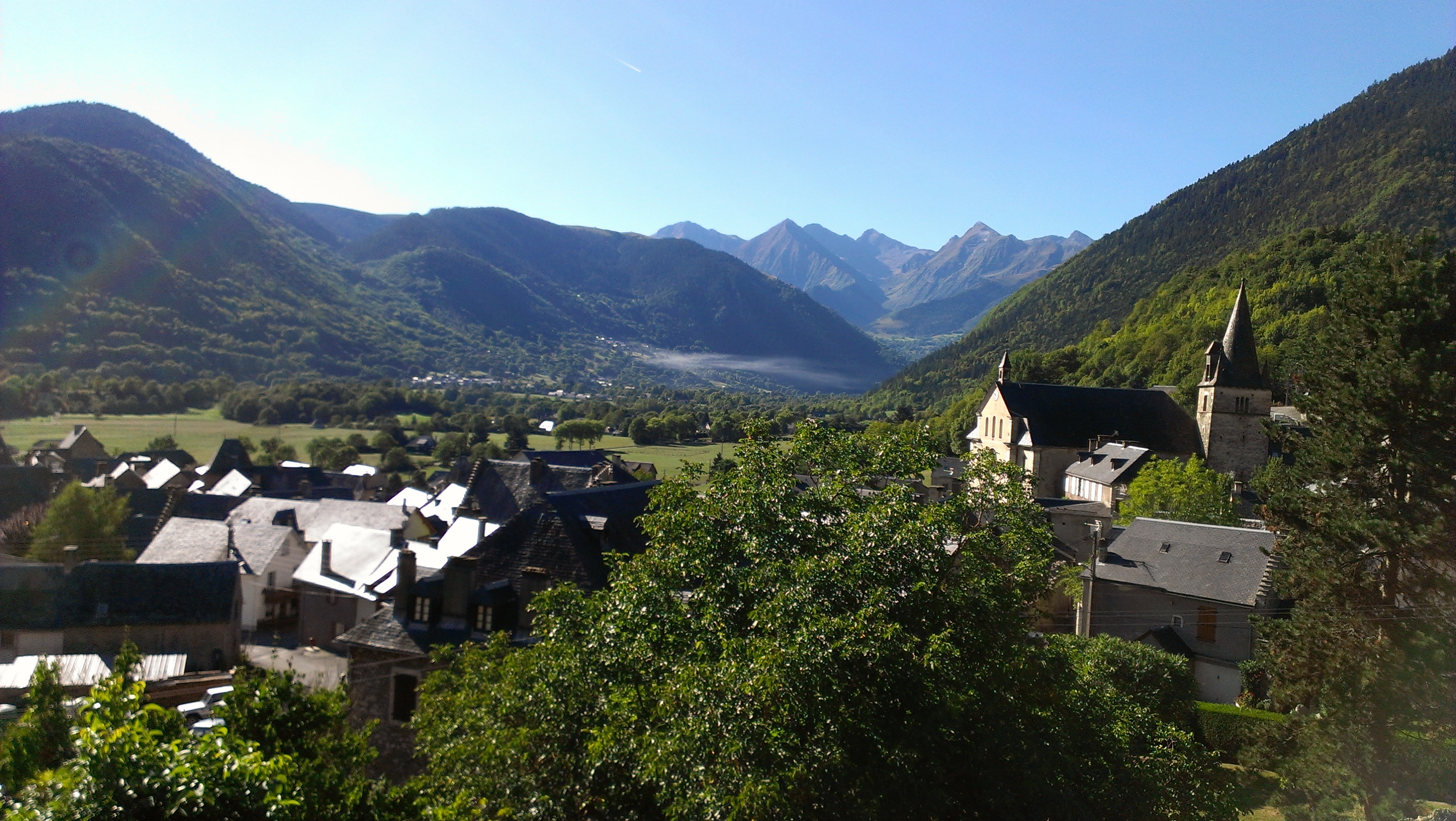
- A general view of the village

- Coat of arms
- Location of Ancizan
- Location within France Location within Occitanie
- Coordinates: 42°52′27″N 0°20′24″E
- Country: France
- Region: Occitania
- Department: Hautes-Pyrénées
- Arrondissement: Bagnères-de-Bigorre
- Canton: Neste, Aure et Louron
- Intercommunality: Aure Louron

Government
  - Mayor (2022–2026): Évelyne Pichon
- Area^{1}: 39.97 km^{2} (15.43 sq mi)
- Highest elevation: 2,843 m (9,327 ft)
- Lowest elevation: 734 m (2,408 ft)
- Population (2023): 294
  - Density: 7.36/km^{2} (19.1/sq mi)
- Time zone: UTC+01:00 (CET)
  - Summer (DST): UTC+02:00 (CEST)
- INSEE/Postal code: 65006 /65440
- ^{1} French Land Register data, which excludes lakes, ponds, glaciers > 1 km^{2} (0.386 sq mi or 247 acres) and river estuaries.

Ancizan (French pronunciation: [ɑ̃sizɑ̃]; Occitan: Ancida) is a commune in the Hautes-Pyrénées department in southwestern France.

== Population ==
Historical population
Year	Pop.	±% p.a.
1968	271	—
1975	239	−1.78%
1982	232	−0.42%
1990	233	+0.05%
1999	254	+0.96%
2007	325	+3.13%
2012	283	−2.73%
2017	271	−0.86%
2023	294	+1.37%
Source: INSEE

== See also ==
- Communes of the Hautes-Pyrénées department
