= Col de Portet d'Aspet =

Mountain pass in France

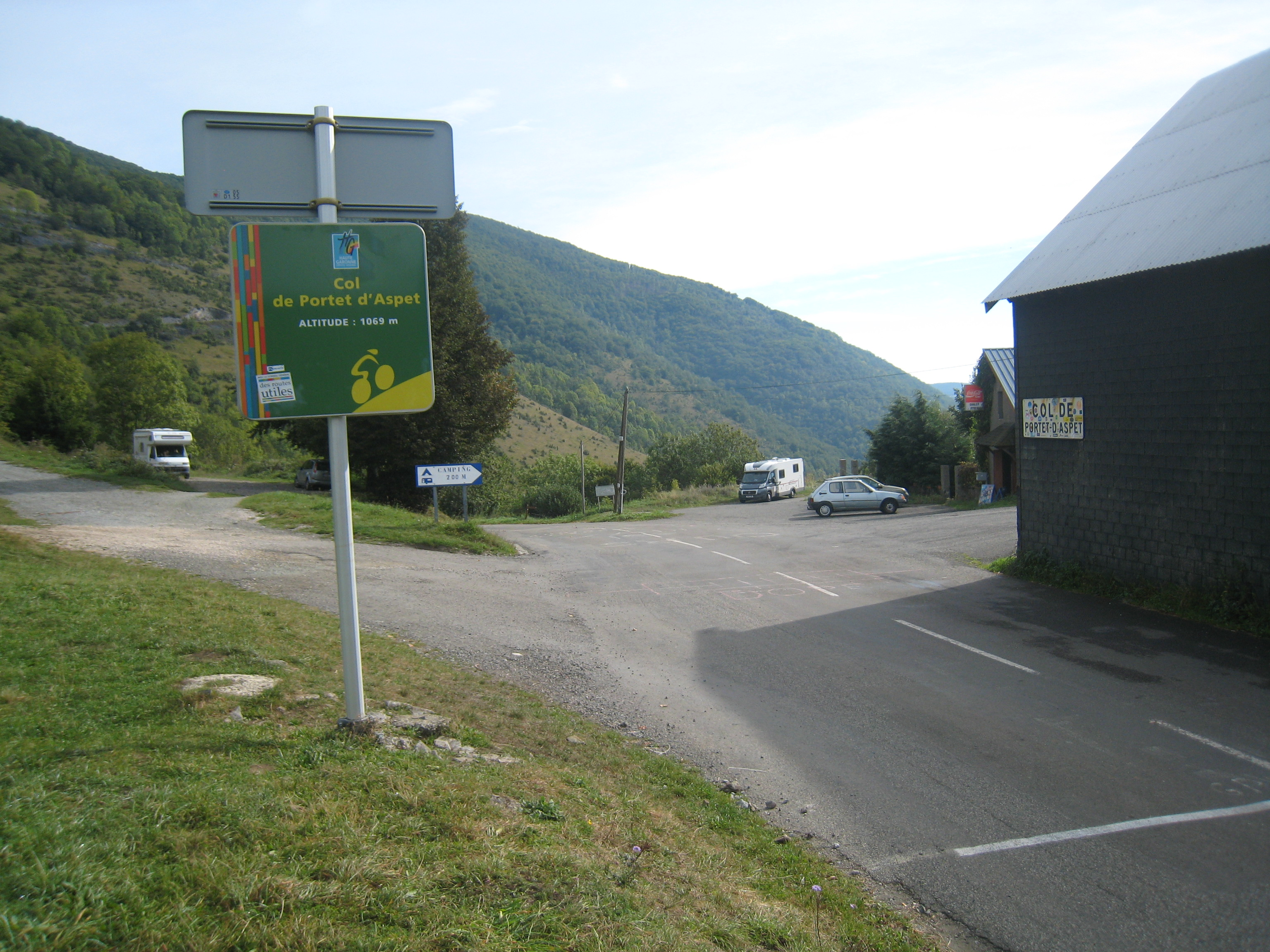
- The summit of the Col de Portet d'Aspet

- Location within Pyrenees
- Elevation: 1,069 m (3,507 ft)
- Traversed by: D618

Location
- Location: Haute-Garonne, France
- Range: Pyrenees
- Coordinates: 42°56′41″N 0°51′15″E

The Col de Portet d'Aspet (elevation 1,069 metres (3,507 ft)) is a mountain pass in the central Pyrenees in the department of Haute-Garonne in France. It is situated on the D618 road between Aspet and Saint-Girons and connects the Ger and Bouigane valleys, on the slopes of the Pic de Paloumère (1,608 metres (5,276 ft)).

== Details of climb ==
Starting from Audressein, in Ariège, the climb is 18.1 km (11.2 mi) long. Over this distance, the climb is 557 m (1,827 ft) at an average gradient of 3.1%. The climb proper starts at Saint-Lary, 5.9 km (3.7 mi) and 393 m (1,289 ft) from the summit (at 6.8%), with the steepest sections being at 10.8% near the summit.

Starting from Aspet, in Haute-Garonne, the climb is 14.3 km (8.9 mi) long. Over this distance, the climb is 594 m (1,949 ft) at an average gradient of 4.2%. The climb proper starts at the D618/D44 junction (also the start of the climb to the Col de Menté), 4.4 km (2.7 mi)/436 m (1,430 ft) from the summit (at 9.6%), with several sections in excess of 11%; the maximum gradient is 12.8%, 3 km (2 mi) from the summit.

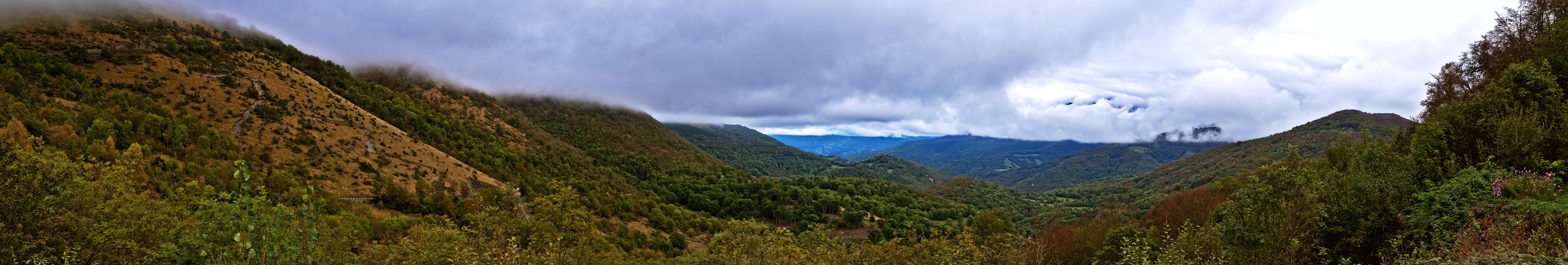
Panorama from the Col de Portet-d'Aspet.

== Appearances in Tour de France ==
The Col de Portet d'Aspet was first used in the Tour de France in 1910 and has appeared regularly since. The leader over the summit in 1910 was Octave Lapize.

Since 1947, the Col has featured 36 times including on stage 15 of the 2024 race.

Year	Stage	Category	Start	Finish	Leader at the summit
2024	15	1	Loudenvielle	Plateau de Beille	Tobias Johannessen (NOR)
2021	16	2	El Pas de la Casa	Saint-Gaudens	Patrick Konrad (AUT)
2018	16	2	Carcassonne	Bagnères-de-Luchon	Philippe Gilbert (BEL)
2015	12	2	Lannemezan	Plateau de Beille	Georg Preidler (AUT)
2014	16	2	Carcassonne	Bagnères-de-Luchon	Thomas Voeckler (FRA)
2013	9	2	Saint-Girons	Bagnères-de-Bigorre	Arnold Jeannesson (FRA)
2011	14	2	Saint-Gaudens	Plateau de Beille	Mickaël Delage (FRA)
2010	15	2	Pamiers	Bagnères-de-Luchon	Thomas Voeckler (FRA)
2007	15	2	Foix	Loudenvielle	Laurent Lefèvre (FRA)
2005	15	2	Lézat-sur-Lèze	Pla d'Adet	Erik Dekker (NED)
2004	13	2	Lannemezan	Plateau de Beille	Sylvain Chavanel (FRA)
2003	14	2	Saint-Girons	Loudenvielle	Richard Virenque (FRA)
2002	12	2	Lannemezan	Plateau de Beille	Laurent Jalabert (FRA)
2001	13	2	Foix	Pla d'Adet	Laurent Roux (FRA)
1998	11	2	Bagnères-de-Luchon	Plateau de Beille	Alberto Elli (ITA)
1997	10	2	Bagnères-de-Luchon	Andorre Arcalis	Laurent Brochard (FRA)
1995	15	2	Saint-Girons	Cauterets	Richard Virenque (FRA)
1988	15	2	Saint-Girons	Luz-Ardiden	Steven Rooks (NED)
1984	11	1	Pau	Guzet-Neige	Theo de Rooij (NED)
1973	13	3	Bourg-Madame	Bagnères-de-Luchon	Raymond Martin (FRA)
1972	9	2	Bagnères-de-Luchon	Colomiers	Christian Raymond (FRA)
1971	14	3	Revel	Bagnères-de-Luchon	José Manuel Fuente (ESP)
1969	16	3	Castelnaudary	Bagnères-de-Luchon	Raymond Delisle (FRA)
1967	16	3	Toulouse	Bagnères-de-Luchon	Fernando Manzanèque (ESP)
1966	12	2	Bagnères-de-Luchon	Revel	Julio Jiménez (ESP)
1965	10	2	Bagnères-de-Bigorre	Ax-les-Thermes	Julio Jiménez (ESP)
1964	15	3	Toulouse	Bagnères-de-Luchon	Julio Jiménez (ESP)
1963	12	2	Bagnères-de-Luchon	Toulouse	Federico Bahamontes (ESP)
1962	14	2	Bagnères-de-Luchon	Carcassonne	Federico Bahamontes (ESP)
1960	12	2	Bagnères-de-Luchon	Toulouse	Joseph Planckaert (BEL)
1958	15	2	Bagnères-de-Luchon	Toulouse	Federico Bahamontes (ESP)
1957	17	3	Ax-les-Thermes	Saint-Gaudens	Michel Stolker (NED)
1956	13	2	Bagnères-de-Luchon	Toulouse	Charly Gaul (LUX)
1951	15	3	Bagnères-de-Luchon	Carcassonne	Gino Bartali (ITA)
1947	14	2	Carcassonne	Bagnères-de-Luchon	Albert Bourlon (FRA)

In the 1973 tour Raymond Poulidor almost died on the descent from the Portet d'Aspet when he plunged off the road into a ravine, taking a serious blow to the head and crawling out with the help of the race director, Jacques Goddet.

== Fabio Casartelli ==
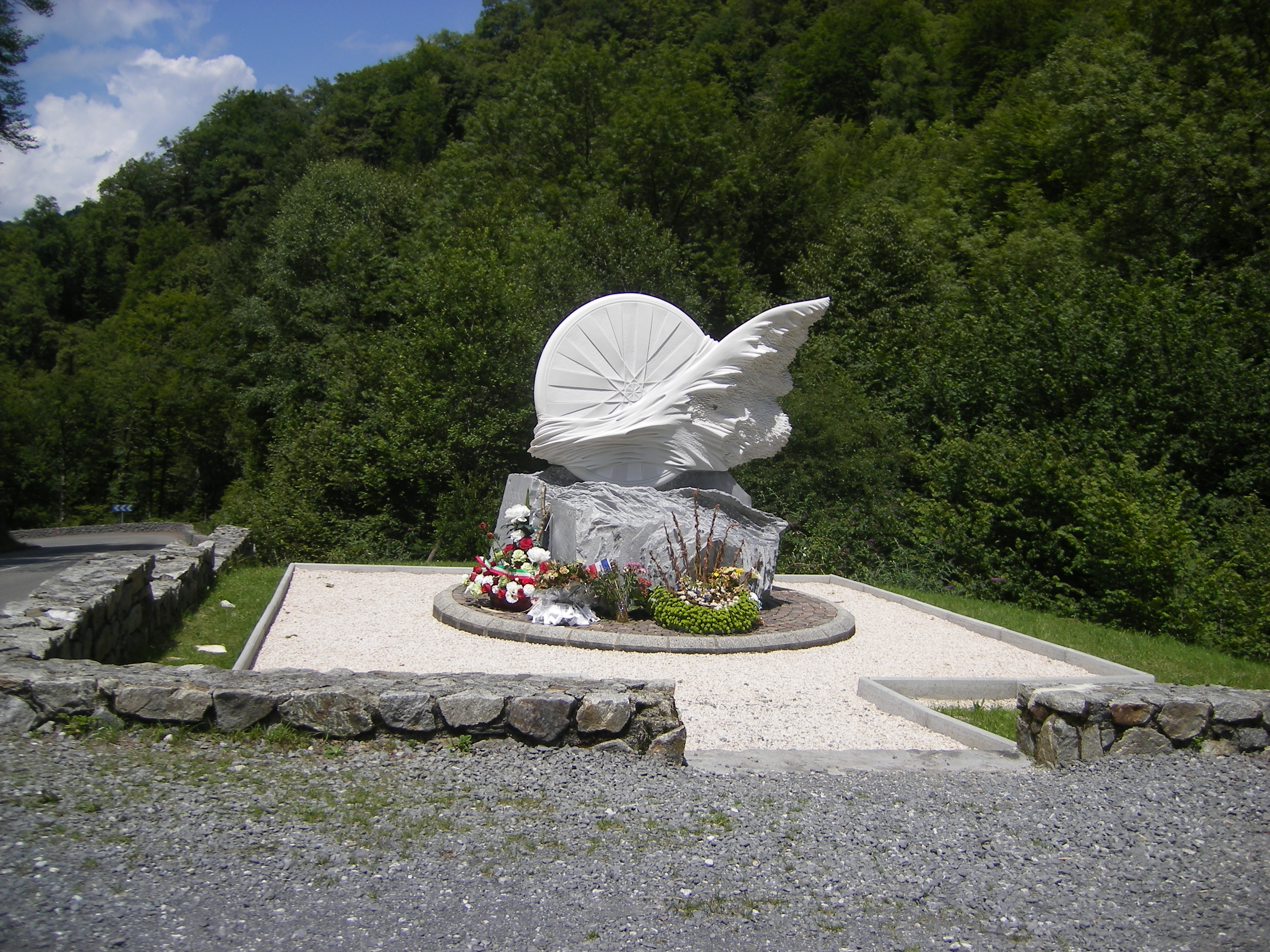
The monument to Fabio Casartelli

On 18 July 1995, during the fifteenth stage of the 1995 Tour de France, Fabio Casartelli and a few other riders crashed on the descent of the Col de Portet d'Aspet. Casartelli sustained heavy facial and head injuries and lost consciousness. While being transported via helicopter to a local hospital, he stopped breathing and after numerous resuscitation attempts was declared dead. The Société du Tour de France and the Motorola team placed a memorial stone dedication to Casartelli on the spot where he crashed.

== Second World War ==
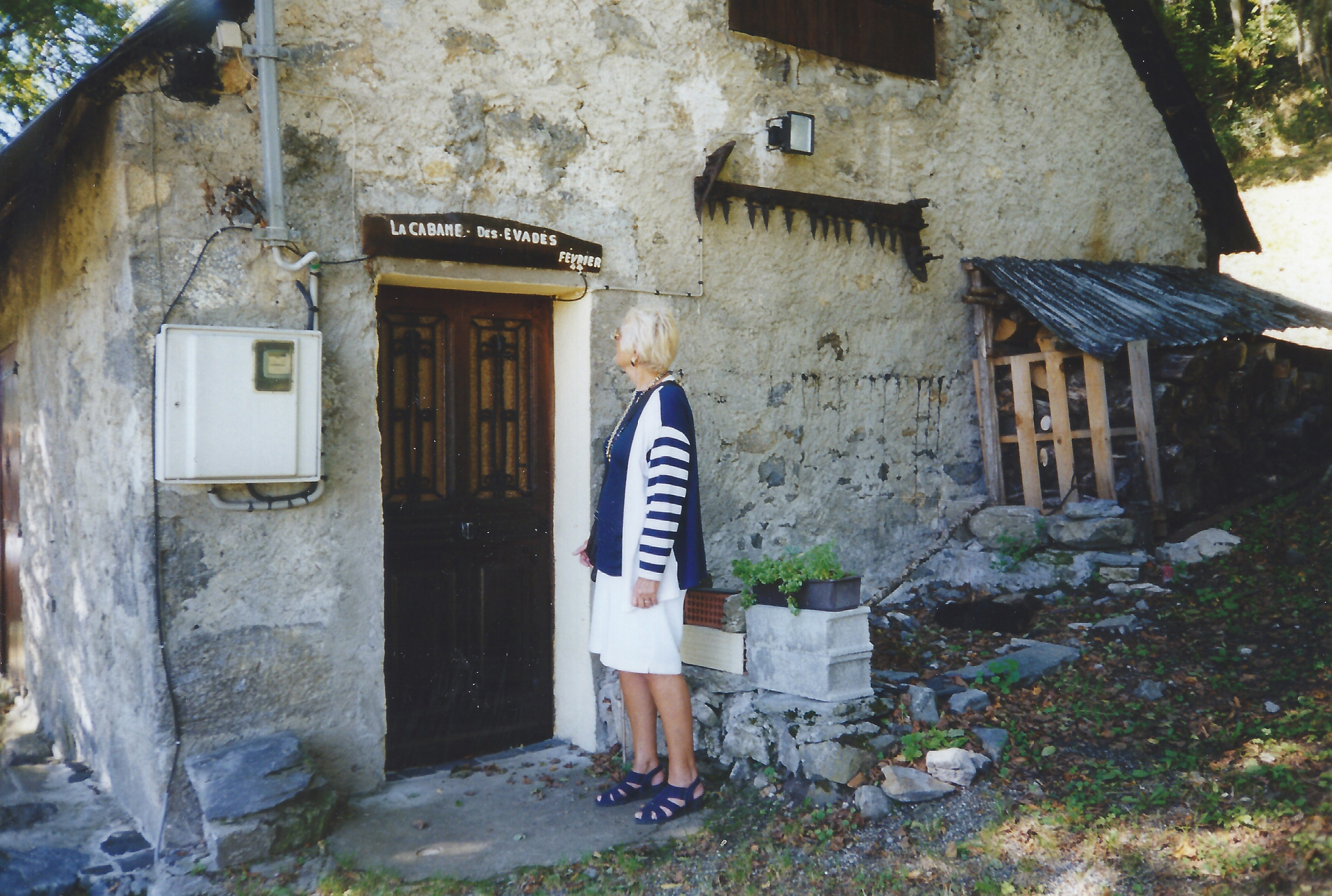
The Cabane des Évadés near the Col de Portet d'Aspet.

During the Second World War, the area around the pass formed part of an escape route from German-occupied France to Spain. On 6 February 1944, a party of Allied airmen and Dutch Engelandvaarders, assisted by the Dutch-Paris escape network, was ambushed by a German patrol near the pass.

The party was led by French guides Pierre Treillet, known as "Palo", and Henri Marrot, known as "Mireille". After an exhausting march through deep snow, the fugitives rested in a mountain hut. As they resumed their journey, Treillet spotted a German patrol dog and warned those following him. German soldiers opened fire. Some of the fugitives escaped up a wooded slope, while others returned to the hut, where they were surrounded and captured.

The captured Allied airmen were subsequently sent to prisoner-of-war camps. Of eight Dutchmen taken prisoner, two later escaped. The remaining six were deported to Nazi concentration camps and did not survive.

Among those who escaped the ambush was Chris van Oosterzee. Treillet led him and several companions back towards Saint-Girons and Cazères. Increased German surveillance subsequently led the guides to abandon the route over the Col de Portet d'Aspet.

A memorial stele near the hut, now known as the Cabane des Évadés, commemorates the events. An additional information panel was inaugurated there in July 2024 to mark their 80th anniversary.
