= Col de Menté =

Mountain pass in the French Pyrenees

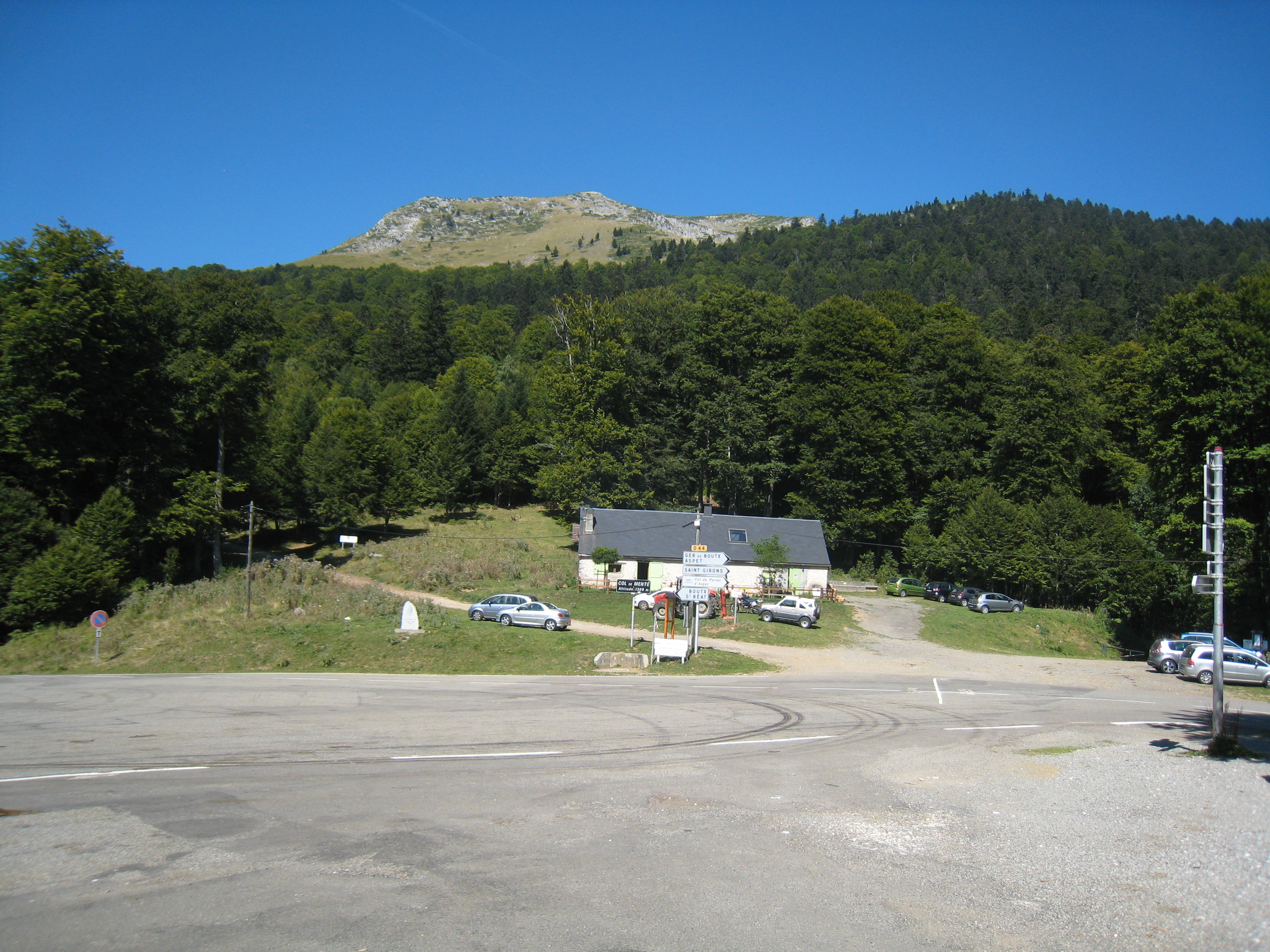
- The summit of the Col de Menté

- Location within Pyrenees
- Elevation: 1,349 m (4,426 ft)
- Traversed by: D44

Third Approach
- Location: Haute-Garonne, France
- Range: Pyrenees
- Coordinates: 42°55′9.7″N 0°45′42.1″E

The Col de Menté (elevation 1,349 m (4,426 ft)) is a mountain pass in the central Pyrenees in the department of Haute-Garonne in France. It is situated on the D44 road between Saint-Béat and the D618 (at the bottom of the Col de Portet d'Aspet) and connects the Ger and Garonne valleys. Le Mourtis ski-station is located 1 km. south of the col.

A stele in memory of Serge Lapébie (son of Guy) is situated at the summit.

== Details of climb ==
Starting from Pont de l'Oule (east) (at the foot of the Col de Portet d'Aspet), the climb is 10.9 km (6.8 mi) long. Over this distance, the climb is 716 m (2,349 ft) (an average gradient of 6.57%). The climb proper starts at Ger-de-Boutx, 7 km (4.3 mi) from the summit (at 7.8%), with the steepest sections being at 11.4%.

Starting from Saint-Béat (west), the climb is 9.3 km (5.8 mi) long. Over this distance, the climb is 849 m (2,785 ft) (an average gradient of 9.13%) with several sections in excess of 11%.

At the summit there is a road that loops up and over the Col de Menté-Le Mourtis (1,409 m (4,623 ft)), via the ski-station, returning to the Col de Menté.

== Appearances in Tour de France ==
The Col de Menté was first used in the Tour de France in 1966 and has appeared frequently since. The leader over the summit in 1966 was Joaquim Galera.

The Col has featured 20 times, including crossing the Col de Menté-Le Mourtis in 1979 and 1995.

Year	Stage	Category	Start	Finish	Leader at the summit
2024	15	1	Loudenvielle	Plateau de Beille	Javier Romo (ESP)
2020	8	1	Cazères	Loudenvielle	Benoit Cosnefroy (FRA)
2017	12	1	Pau	Peyragudes	Michael Matthews (AUS)
2013	9	1	Saint-Girons	Bagnères-de-Bigorre	Tom Danielson (USA)
2012	17	1	Bagnères-de-Luchon	Peyragudes	Thomas Voeckler (FRA)
2007	15	1	Foix	Loudenvielle	Juan Manuel Gárate (ESP)
2005	15	1	Lézat-sur-Lèze	Pla d'Adet	Erik Dekker (NED)
2003	14	1	Saint-Girons	Loudenvielle	Richard Virenque (FRA)
2001	13	1	Foix	Pla d'Adet	Laurent Jalabert (FRA)
1999	15	1	Saint-Gaudens	Piau-Engaly	Alberto Elli (ITA)
1998	11	1	Bagnères-de-Luchon	Plateau de Beille	Alberto Elli (ITA)
1995	15	1	Saint-Girons	Cauterets	Richard Virenque (FRA)
1988	15	1	Saint-Girons	Luz Ardiden	Robert Millar (GBR)
1979	1	2	Fleurance	Bagnères-de-Luchon	Bernard Hinault (FRA)
1976	14	2	Saint-Gaudens	Saint-Lary-Soulan	Lucien Van Impe (BEL)
1973	13	2	Bourg-Madame	Bagnères-de-Luchon	José Manuel Fuente (ESP)
1971	14	2	Revel	Bagnères-de-Luchon	José Manuel Fuente (ESP)
1970	18	2	Saint-Gaudens	La Mongie	Guerrino Tosello (ITA)
1969	16	2	Castelnaudary	Bagnères-de-Luchon	Raymond Delisle (FRA)
1967	16	1	Toulouse	Bagnères-de-Luchon	Fernando Manzanèque (ESP)
1966	11	2	Pau	Bagnères-de-Luchon	Joaquim Galera (ESP)

== Luis Ocaña ==
On stage 14 of the 1971 Tour de France Spanish cyclist Luis Ocaña was in the Maillot Jaune with an overall lead of 7 minutes on Eddy Merckx and they crossed the summit of the Col de Menté together in a storm, with streams of mud running across the road. Merckx, an excellent descender, attacked as he descended dangerously down the mountain road. To stay in contact with Merckx, Ocaña took risks descending. Flying through the corners, Merckx lost control and skidded into a low retaining wall at the side of the road. Ocaña trailing close behind could not avoid the fallen Merckx and fell himself. Merckx was up quickly and sped away. Ocaña struggled to release his cleats from the toe clips and was struck by the pursuing Joop Zoetemelk. Ocaña lay on the ground screaming with pain. Help arrived quickly and Ocaña was rushed by helicopter to the hospital in St. Gaudens. He recovered from his injuries, but his 1971 Tour dreams had come to an end. The following day Merckx refused to wear the yellow jersey in order to pay tribute to Ocaña. There is now a memorial plaque at the scene of the accident on the western side of the Col de Menté (at 42°54′55.9″N 0°44′37.7″E).
