= Chris van Oosterzee =

Dutch Engelandvaarder and soldier (1922–1989)

- Van Oosterzee before his escape from the occupied Netherlands
- Born: Christiaan Vincent Gradwell van Oosterzee; 20 March 1922; Weltevreden, Batavia, Dutch East Indies
- Died: 18 April 1989 (aged 67); Amsterdam, Netherlands
- Occupations: Soldier, bank employee
- Known for: Escape from the German-occupied Netherlands during the Second World War
- Awards: Cross of Merit; Resistance Memorial Cross

Christiaan Vincent Gradwell van Oosterzee (20 March 1922 – 18 April 1989), known as Chris van Oosterzee, was a Dutch resistance member, soldier and Engelandvaarder—one of the Dutch people who escaped from the occupied Netherlands to Britain to contribute to the Allied war effort. During the Second World War, he escaped from the German-occupied Netherlands with assistance from the Dutch-Paris escape network. He survived the German ambush of an escape party at the Col de Portet d'Aspet in the Pyrenees on 6 February 1944.

Van Oosterzee reached Spain on a second crossing and arrived in Britain in October 1944. After training in Australia, he served in the Royal Netherlands East Indies Army (KNIL) during the Indonesian National Revolution. He returned to the Netherlands in 1948 and subsequently worked in banking.

== Early life and German occupation ==
Van Oosterzee was born in Weltevreden, Batavia, in the Dutch East Indies, to a Dutch father and an English mother. His family moved to the Netherlands in 1935. He completed secondary school in June 1940, shortly after the German invasion, and began studying at the Technical College in Delft that September. During the occupation, he was arrested following a confrontation with members of the National Socialist Movement in The Hague and imprisoned in the Oranjehotel in Scheveningen.

In his later interrogation in London, he stated that he had refused to sign the loyalty declaration required of students and had gone into hiding to avoid compulsory labour in Germany. In 1943, he found refuge with the Hak family in Dussen.

== Escape from occupied Europe ==
=== Journey through Belgium and France ===
Escape route of Chris van Oosterzee from the Netherlands to Britain in 1944. Dates indicate departures, except for London, where the arrival date is shown.

After an unsuccessful attempt to escape across the North Sea, Van Oosterzee took the overland route towards Spain. He left the Netherlands on 11 January 1944.

In Brussels, he stayed with the Timmers Verhoeven family. Together with Sam Timmers Verhoeven and other Engelandvaarders, he continued to Paris, assisted by Dutch-Paris. The network arranged accommodation and onward travel. On 3 February, the party left for Toulouse, where it joined other fugitives preparing to cross the Pyrenees into Spain.

=== Ambush at the Col de Portet d'Aspet ===
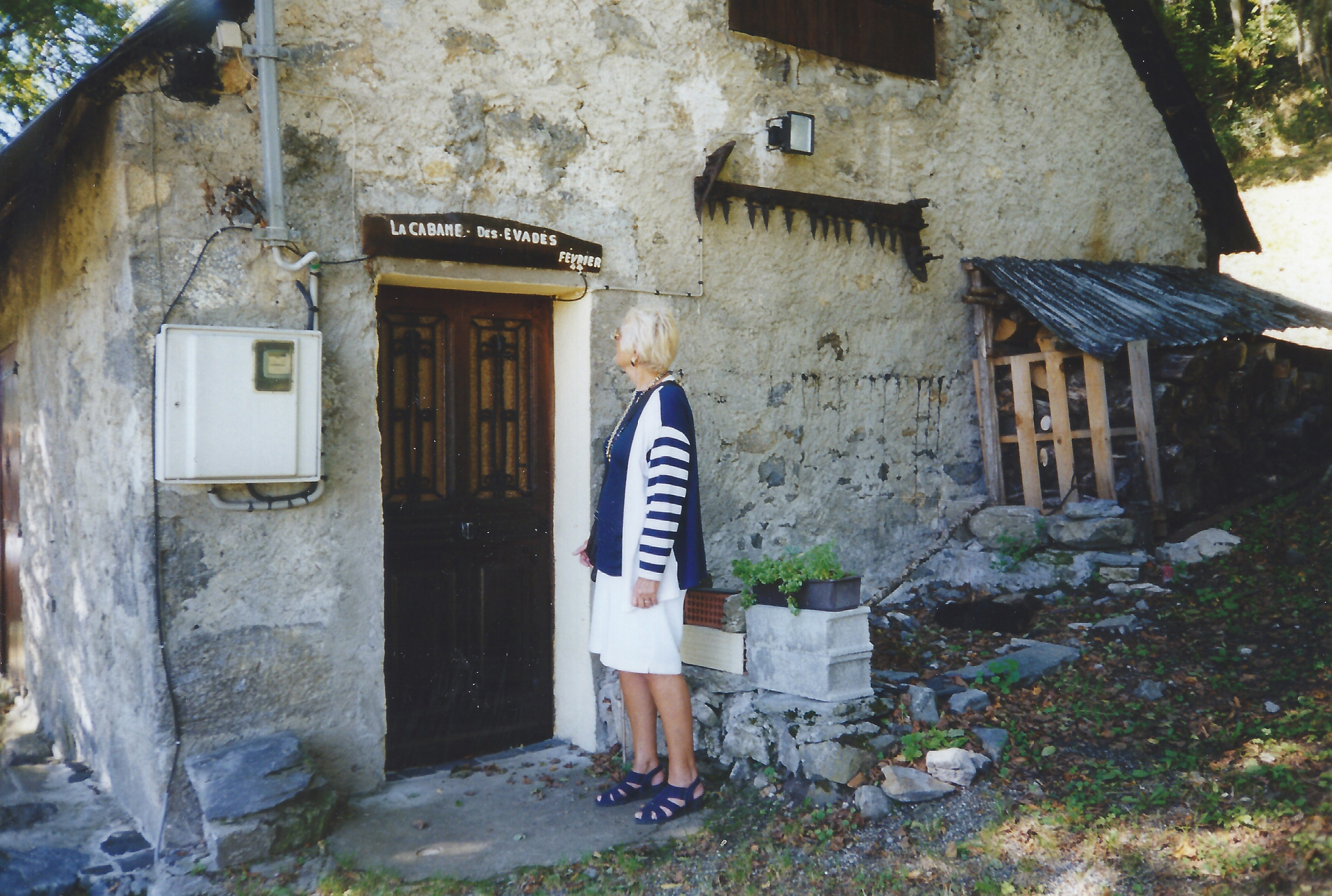
The Cabane des Évadés near the Col de Portet d'Aspet. Fugitives who took refuge in the hut during the ambush were captured.

The escape party was led by Pierre Treillet, known as "Palo", and Henri Marot, known as "Mireille". After a prolonged climb through heavy snow, the exhausted fugitives rested in a mountain hut near the Col de Portet d'Aspet. On 6 February 1944, as they resumed their journey, Treillet spotted a German patrol dog and warned those behind him. German troops opened fire. Some fugitives escaped up a wooded slope; others returned to the hut, where they were surrounded and captured.

According to historian Megan Koreman, only about half of the convoy ultimately reached Spain. Six captured Dutchmen were deported as political prisoners and died in Nazi concentration camps. The captured Allied airmen were interrogated and sent to prisoner-of-war camps. Two other captured Engelandvaarders later escaped during a prisoner transport after being held in Toulouse.

Van Oosterzee escaped with a small group of Belgian, British, American and Australian fugitives. Treillet found them hiding on the wooded slope and led them away from the frontier, towards Saint-Girons and Cazères. They subsequently returned to Toulouse.

Historian Jean-Luc Cartron identifies the ambush as the only failed crossing conducted by Treillet and Marot. It also ended their use of the Portet d'Aspet route, which had become too dangerous because of German surveillance. Van Oosterzee and his companions therefore had to attempt another route into Spain.

=== Second crossing and arrival in Britain ===
On 16 February 1944, Van Oosterzee and his companions left Toulouse for another attempt to reach Spain. They travelled by train to Montréjeau, where guides including Jean-Louis Bazerque, known as "Charbonnier", arranged their onward journey into the mountains. Heavy snowfall forced them to shelter there for several weeks. A larger party eventually set out from Ardon in the Barousse valley and crossed the mountains, avoiding the German border-control headquarters at Bagnères-de-Luchon. Van Oosterzee reached Bossòst, in Spain's Val d'Aran, on 19 March 1944.

Among his companions on this crossing was Victor J. Ferrari, a second lieutenant and navigator in the United States Army Air Forces. Ferrari later became a colonel in the United States Air Force and deputy commander of cadets at the United States Air Force Academy.

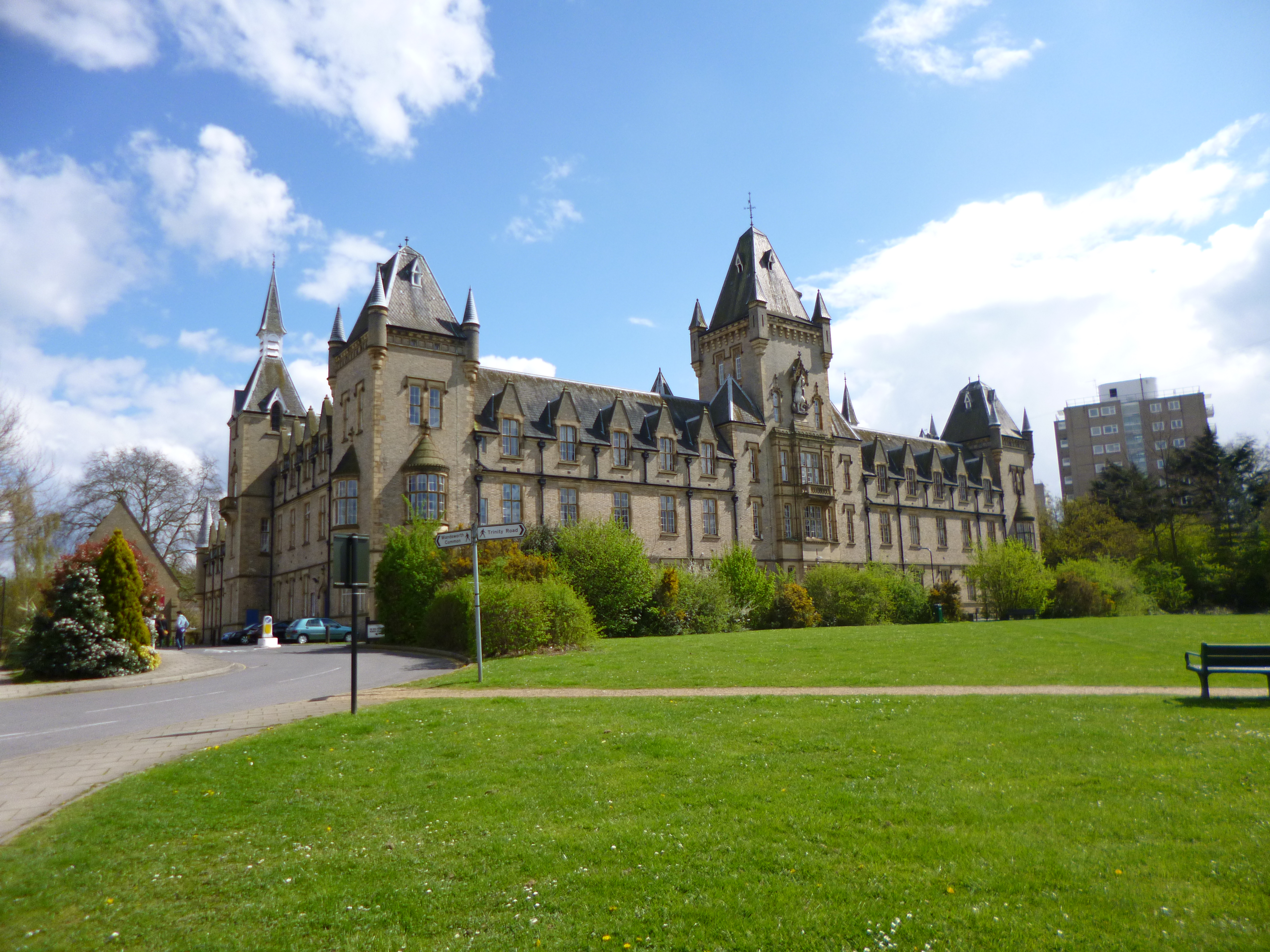
The Royal Victoria Patriotic Building in London, used to screen arrivals from occupied Europe. Van Oosterzee passed through the centre in 1944.

In Spain, Van Oosterzee was detained by the Civil Guard and released following Dutch consular intervention. His onward journey took several more months. In his November 1944 interrogation, he attributed the delay to Britain's closure to new arrivals. A plan to travel through the United States and join the Dutch colonial army was abandoned when his party was stopped in Oran and directed to Algiers. He left Algiers by sea on 14 October and reached Britain on 21 October 1944.

His journey had taken more than nine months and passed through Belgium, France, Spain, Gibraltar and Algeria. After screening at the Royal Victoria Patriotic School, he was interviewed in London by the Dutch Police External Service on 21 November. The report assessed him as politically reliable and suitable for officer training.

== Military service ==
In Britain, Van Oosterzee joined the Princess Irene Brigade and requested deployment to Australia to prepare for service against Japan. He left Liverpool on 16 January 1945 and arrived in Australia on 21 February.

His training included a course for the Netherlands Indies Civil Administration (NICA), which was preparing personnel for service in the East Indies, as well as jungle training at Camp Casino and the Australian Jungle Warfare School at Canungra. In his petition of 1949, he stated that his assignment to the administrative training course on 16 March 1945 had been against his wishes, prompted by an anticipated shortage of civil administrators after Japan's surrender. On 14 September 1945, he was commissioned as a reserve second lieutenant in the KNIL at Camp Columbia.

He subsequently served in Makassar, where his duties included civil administration and transport work for NICA, the KNIL and the Royal Netherlands Navy. His service coincided with the Indonesian struggle for independence and the Dutch attempt to restore colonial authority.

In a letter to Prince Bernhard dated 29 July 1948, his father, Carl Friedrich van Oosterzee, wrote that his son had requested release from service in 1946, considering that he had completed his agreed term of service. His father reported that, despite repeated efforts to obtain a decision, the request had remained unresolved for approximately two years. He was eventually repatriated to the Netherlands in November 1948.

== Personal and later life ==
In 1946, Van Oosterzee married by proxy, and his wife subsequently joined him in Makassar.

After his military service, he worked in banking, holding positions in the Netherlands and abroad. He later lived in France. He died in Amsterdam on 18 April 1989, aged 67, and was survived by his wife, Paulina Helena Worp.

== Honours ==
Van Oosterzee was awarded the Cross of Merit by royal decree of 14 September 1945 for organising and carrying out his escape from the occupied Netherlands to Britain. He also received the Resistance Memorial Cross.
