= Saint-Lary =

Saint-Lary is the name of two communes in France:

- Saint-Lary, Ariège in the Ariège department
- Saint-Lary, Gers, in the Gers department
