= Arreau =

- Commune
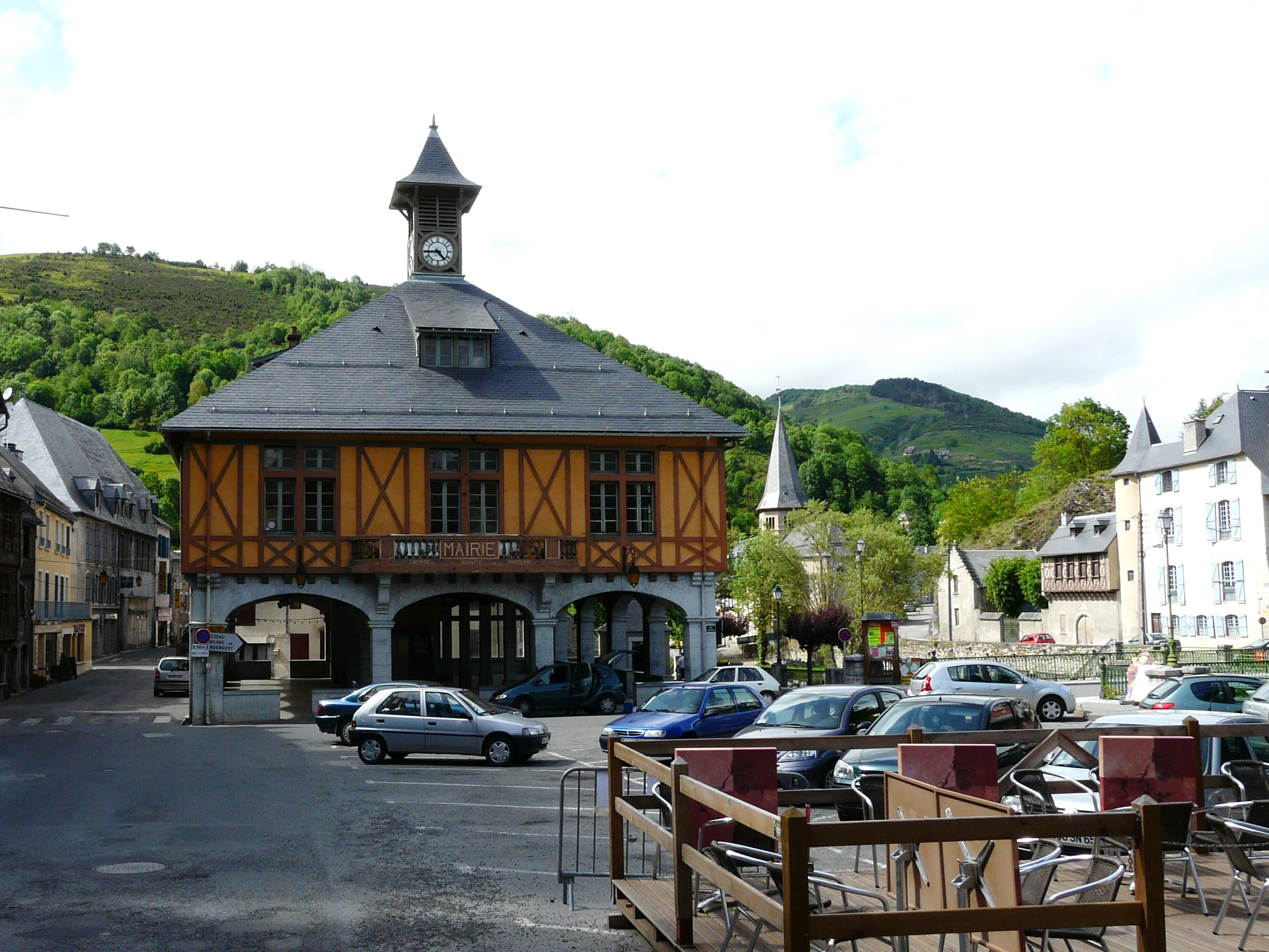
- The town hall square

- Coat of arms
- Location of Arreau
- Location within France Location within Occitanie
- Coordinates: 42°54′22″N 0°21′35″E
- Country: France
- Region: Occitania
- Department: Hautes-Pyrénées
- Arrondissement: Bagnères-de-Bigorre
- Canton: Neste, Aure et Louron
- Intercommunality: CC Aure Louron

Government
  - Mayor (2020–2026): Philippe Carrère
- Area^{1}: 11.12 km^{2} (4.29 sq mi)
- Elevation: 730 m (2,400 ft)
- Highest elevation: 1,756 m (5,761 ft)
- Lowest elevation: 658 m (2,159 ft)
- Population (2023): 725
  - Density: 65.2/km^{2} (169/sq mi)
- Time zone: UTC+01:00 (CET)
  - Summer (DST): UTC+02:00 (CEST)
- INSEE/Postal code: 65031 /65240
- ^{1} French Land Register data, which excludes lakes, ponds, glaciers > 1 km^{2} (0.386 sq mi or 247 acres) and river estuaries.

Arreau (French pronunciation: [aʁo]; Occitan: Àrreu) is a commune in the Hautes-Pyrénées department in southwestern France.

It is situated on the former Route nationale 618, the Route of the Pyrénées. Arreau is at the crossroads of the Louron valley and the Aure valley.

== Geography ==
=== Climate ===
Arreau has an oceanic climate (Köppen climate classification Cfb). The average annual temperature in Arreau is 9.6 °C (49.3 °F). The average annual rainfall is 894.8 mm (35.23 in) with November as the wettest month. The temperatures are highest on average in July, at around 17.6 °C (63.7 °F), and lowest in January, at around 2.0 °C (35.6 °F). The highest temperature ever recorded in Arreau was 38.5 °C (101.3 °F) on 30 July 1983; the coldest temperature ever recorded was −23.0 °C (−9.4 °F) on 3 February 1956.

Climate data for Arreau (1981−2010 normals, extremes 1943−2015)
Month	Jan	Feb	Mar	Apr	May	Jun	Jul	Aug	Sep	Oct	Nov	Dec	Year
Record high °C (°F)	24.0 (75.2)	27.5 (81.5)	27.0 (80.6)	29.0 (84.2)	36.0 (96.8)	37.0 (98.6)	38.5 (101.3)	38.0 (100.4)	35.0 (95.0)	30.5 (86.9)	25.2 (77.4)	22.5 (72.5)	38.5 (101.3)
Mean daily maximum °C (°F)	7.0 (44.6)	9.4 (48.9)	12.3 (54.1)	13.8 (56.8)	17.6 (63.7)	21.0 (69.8)	23.6 (74.5)	23.5 (74.3)	20.8 (69.4)	17.2 (63.0)	11.0 (51.8)	7.1 (44.8)	15.4 (59.7)
Daily mean °C (°F)	2.0 (35.6)	3.5 (38.3)	6.1 (43.0)	7.9 (46.2)	11.7 (53.1)	15.0 (59.0)	17.6 (63.7)	17.3 (63.1)	14.4 (57.9)	11.0 (51.8)	5.7 (42.3)	2.5 (36.5)	9.6 (49.3)
Mean daily minimum °C (°F)	−3.1 (26.4)	−2.5 (27.5)	−0.1 (31.8)	2.0 (35.6)	5.8 (42.4)	9.1 (48.4)	11.5 (52.7)	11.1 (52.0)	7.9 (46.2)	4.7 (40.5)	0.3 (32.5)	−2.2 (28.0)	3.7 (38.7)
Record low °C (°F)	−19.0 (−2.2)	−23.0 (−9.4)	−20.0 (−4.0)	−8.2 (17.2)	−5.0 (23.0)	−2.0 (28.4)	1.0 (33.8)	0.0 (32.0)	−3.0 (26.6)	−7.5 (18.5)	−15.8 (3.6)	−20.0 (−4.0)	−23.0 (−9.4)
Average precipitation mm (inches)	90.0 (3.54)	60.9 (2.40)	70.2 (2.76)	84.6 (3.33)	88.2 (3.47)	66.7 (2.63)	59.4 (2.34)	61.2 (2.41)	62.4 (2.46)	70.9 (2.79)	93.2 (3.67)	87.1 (3.43)	894.8 (35.23)
Average precipitation days (≥ 1.0 mm)	10.0	8.7	10.2	12.1	13.2	9.8	7.3	8.4	8.6	10.1	10.1	10.4	118.8
Source: Météo-France

== Population ==
Historical population
Year	Pop.	±% p.a.
1968	936	—
1975	913	−0.35%
1982	816	−1.59%
1990	853	+0.56%
1999	823	−0.40%
2007	814	−0.14%
2012	813	−0.02%
2017	773	−1.00%
2023	725	−1.06%
Source: INSEE

== See also ==
- Communes of the Hautes-Pyrénées department
