= Chaum =

- Commune
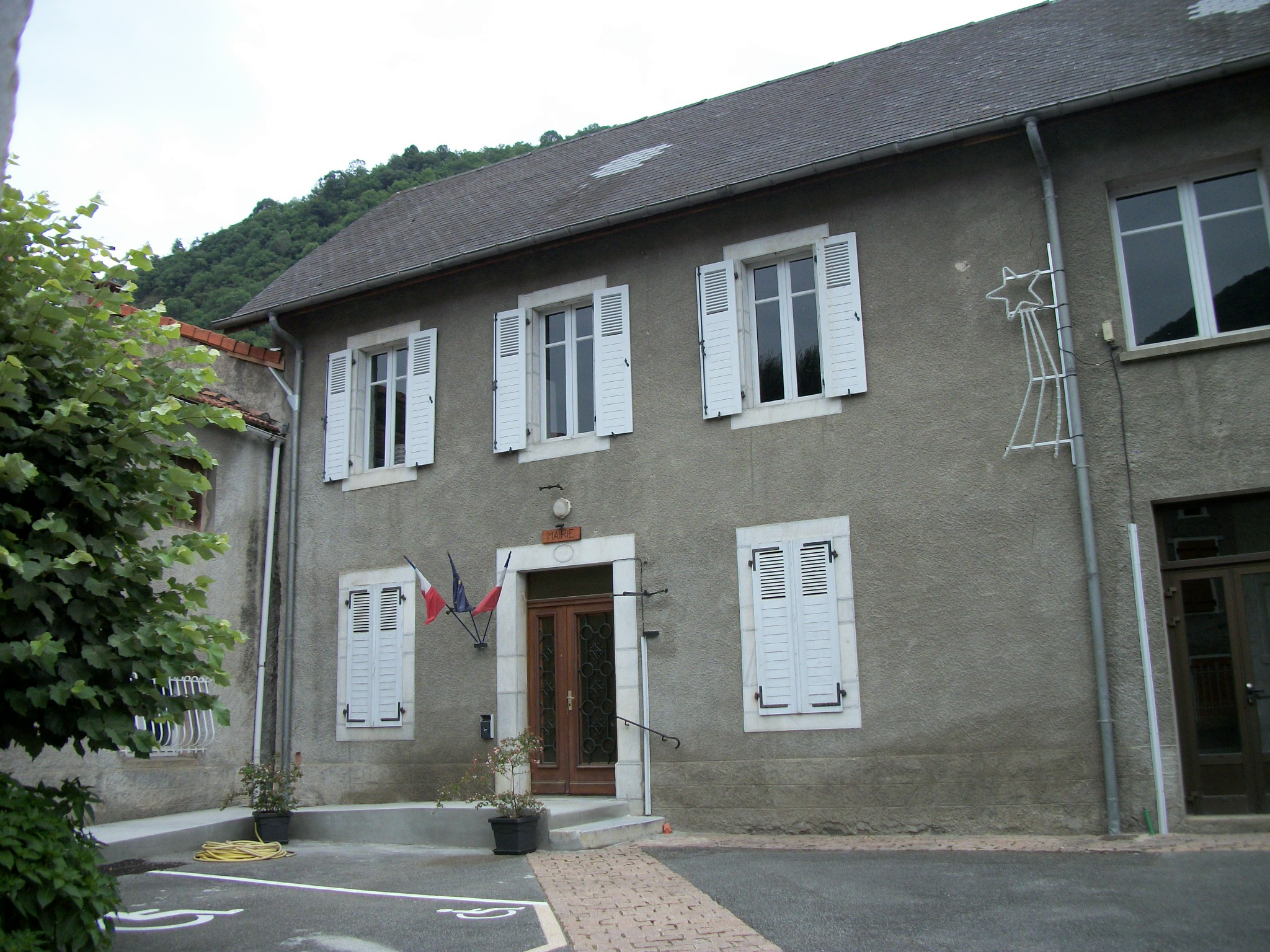
- The town hall in Chaum

- Coat of arms
- Location of Chaum
- Location within France Location within Occitanie
- Coordinates: 42°56′07″N 0°39′22″E
- Country: France
- Region: Occitania
- Department: Haute-Garonne
- Arrondissement: Saint-Gaudens
- Canton: Bagnères-de-Luchon
- Intercommunality: Pyrénées Haut Garonnaises

Government
  - Mayor (2020–2026): Joseph Castell
- Area^{1}: 5.7 km^{2} (2.2 sq mi)
- Elevation: 475 m (1,558 ft)
- Highest elevation: 1,680 m (5,510 ft)
- Lowest elevation: 468 m (1,535 ft)
- Population (2023): 205
  - Density: 36/km^{2} (93/sq mi)
- Time zone: UTC+01:00 (CET)
  - Summer (DST): UTC+02:00 (CEST)
- INSEE/Postal code: 31139 /31440
- ^{1} French Land Register data, which excludes lakes, ponds, glaciers > 1 km^{2} (0.386 sq mi or 247 acres) and river estuaries.

Chaum is a commune in the Haute-Garonne department in southwestern France.

It is situated on the former Route nationale 618, the "Route of the Pyrenees".

== Population ==
Historical population
Year	Pop.	±% p.a.
1968	255	—
1975	247	−0.45%
1982	212	−2.16%
1990	198	−0.85%
1999	193	−0.28%
2007	203	+0.63%
2012	205	+0.20%
2017	189	−1.61%
2023	205	+1.36%
Source: INSEE

== See also ==
- Communes of the Haute-Garonne department
