= Saint-Girons =

Saint-Girons is the name or part of the name of several communes in France:

- Saint-Girons, Ariège, in the Ariège department
- Saint-Girons-d'Aiguevives, in the Gironde department
- Saint-Girons-en-Béarn (formerly Saint-Girons), in the Pyrénées-Atlantiques department
- Vielle-Saint-Girons, in the Landes department
