= Audressein =

Commune in Occitanie, France

- Commune
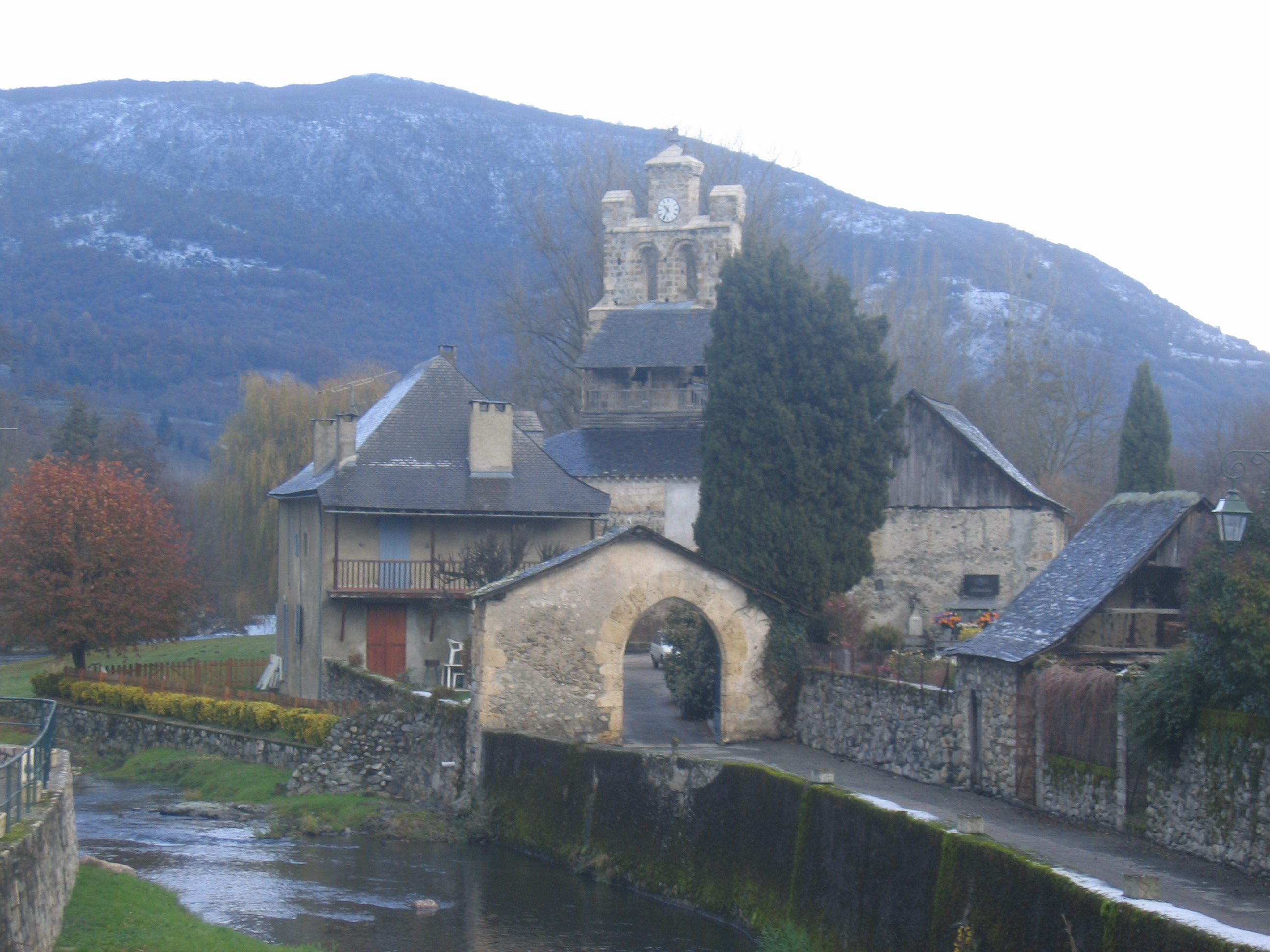
- The church in the centre of the village
- Location of Audressein
- Location within France Location within Occitanie
- Coordinates: 42°55′46″N 1°01′28″E
- Country: France
- Region: Occitania
- Department: Ariège
- Arrondissement: Saint-Girons
- Canton: Couserans Ouest
- Intercommunality: CC Couserans - Pyrénées

Government
  - Mayor (2020–2026): Michel Anglade
- Area^{1}: 3.98 km^{2} (1.54 sq mi)
- Elevation: 500 m (1,600 ft)
- Highest elevation: 959 m (3,146 ft)
- Lowest elevation: 489 m (1,604 ft)
- Population (2023): 144
  - Density: 36.2/km^{2} (93.7/sq mi)
- Time zone: UTC+01:00 (CET)
  - Summer (DST): UTC+02:00 (CEST)
- INSEE/Postal code: 09026 /09800
- ^{1} French Land Register data, which excludes lakes, ponds, glaciers > 1 km^{2} (0.386 sq mi or 247 acres) and river estuaries.

Audressein (French pronunciation: [odʁɛsɛ̃]; Occitan: Audressenh) is a commune in the Ariège department in the Occitanie region of south-western France.

== Geography ==
Audressein is situated on the former Route nationale 618, the "Route of the Pyrenees", at the start of the climb to the Col de la Core some 18 km south-west of Saint-Girons. Access to the commune is by the D618 road from Argein in the west which passes through the centre of the commune and the village and continues to Engomer in the north-east. The D804 goes from Sor in the west through the commune just south of the village and continues to Castillon-en-Couserans in the south-east. The commune is mixed forest and farmland with substantial forests in the north.

The Léz river flows through the commune from south to north forming the south-eastern border of the commune and continues north-east to join the Salat at Saint-Girons. The Bouigane river flows from the west across the commune to join the Lez at the village. The Long Rieu stream rises in the north of the commune and flows south to join the Bouigane near the village.

== Administration ==
List of Successive Mayors

From	To	Name
1989	1995	Louis Anglade
1995	2001	Marcel Catala
2001	2008	Annie Ajas
2008	2020	Oscar Girotto
2020	2026	Michel Anglade

== Demography ==
The inhabitants of the commune are known as Audressenois or Audressenoises in French.

Historical population

Year	Pop.	±% p.a.
1793	334	—
1821	412	+0.75%
1846	473	+0.55%
1872	465	−0.07%
1901	320	−1.28%
1926	243	−1.09%
1946	200	−0.97%
1962	160	−1.38%
1968	150	−1.07%

Year	Pop.	±% p.a.
1975	132	−1.81%
1982	123	−1.00%
1990	121	−0.20%
1999	107	−1.36%
2007	119	+1.34%
2012	117	−0.34%
2017	139	+3.51%
2023	144	+0.59%

Source: EHESS and INSEE

== Culture and heritage ==
=== Civil heritage ===
The commune has two sites that are registered as historical monuments:

- The Hydraulic Thresher Building (19th century)
- An Ornamental Garden

=== Religious heritage ===
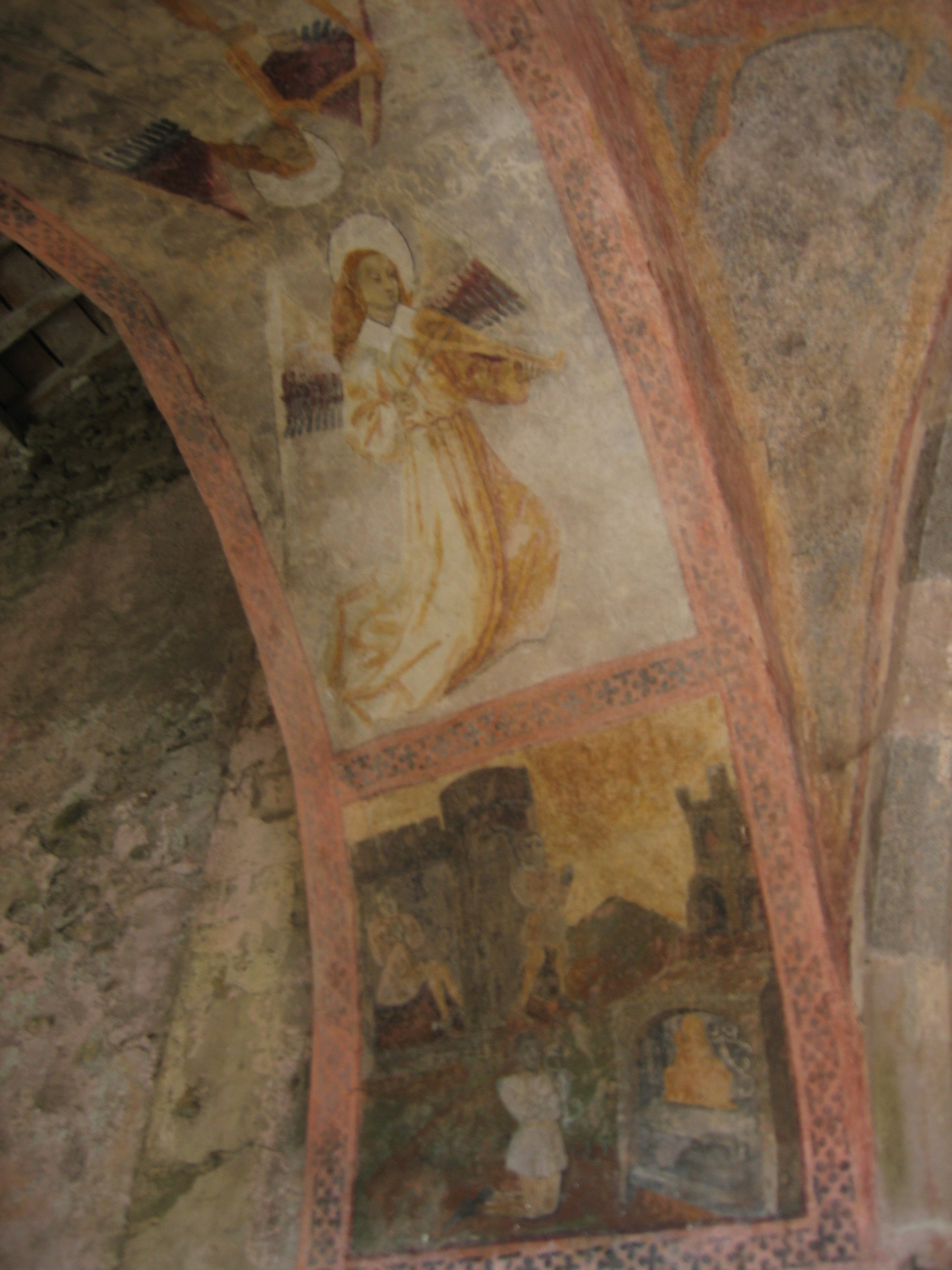
Mural in the Audressein Church: an angel playing a medieval vielle with an archer.

The commune has one religious building that is registered as an historical monument:

- The Church of Notre-Dame-de-Tramesaygues (14th century). The church is listed as a World Heritage Site on the Routes of Santiago de Compostela. The original porch had three entries and a Bell tower from the 14th century. The church contains several items that are registered as historical objects:
  - A Wayside Cross (15th century)
  - A Baptismal Font (17th century)
  - A Cabinet for Baptismal Fonts (17th century)
  - A Bronze Bell (1558)
  - A Group Sculpture: Virgin of Pity (15th century)
  - An ex-voto Monumental Painting (15th century)
  - Ex-voto Monumental Paintings (16th century)

Other religious sites

- The Church of Saint-Martin
- The Presbytery contains one item that is registered as an historical object:
  - A Cross (14th century)

== See also ==
- Communes of the Ariège department
