= Route nationale 618 =

Route nationale in France

Route nationale 618 or RN 618 was a French national road linking Saint-Jean-de-Luz (on the Atlantic Ocean) to Argelès-sur-Mer (on the Mediterranean). En route it crossed many of the famous passes in the Pyrenees, immortalized by the Tour de France; hence its name was the "Route of the Pyrénées". In 1970, the road was down-graded and is now the RD 918 from Saint-Jean-de-Luz to Arreau and the RD 618 from Arreau to Argelès Plage.

== Itinerary ==
The places named in italic are mountain passes used in the Tour de France.

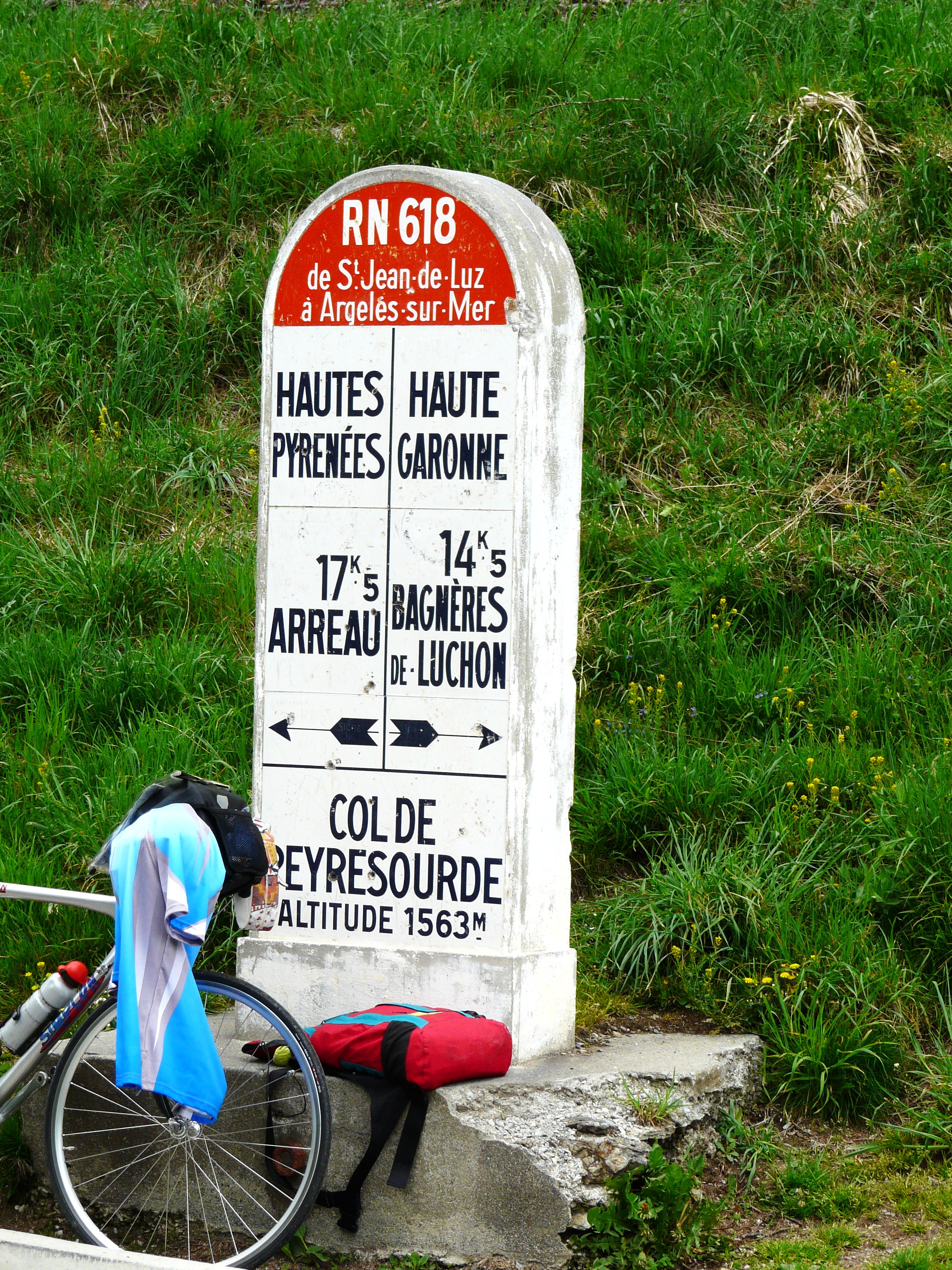

- Saint-Jean-de-Luz
- Cambo-les-Bains
- Saint-Jean-Pied-de-Port

Common with the former RN 133

- Larceveau-Arros-Cibits
- Mauléon-Licharre
- Issor

Common with RN 134

- Lurbe-Saint-Christau
- Arudy

Common with the former RN 134^{BIS}

- Laruns
- Col d'Aubisque
- Col du Soulor
- Arrens-Marsous
- Argelès-Gazost

Common with the former RN 21

- Luz-Saint-Sauveur
- Barèges
- Col du Tourmalet
- Sainte-Marie-de-Campan
- Col d'Aspin
- Arreau
- Col de Peyresourde
- Bagnères-de-Luchon

Common with the former RN 125

- Saint-Mamet
- Col du Portillon, Spanish frontier.

Route interrupted by the Spanish border

- Chaum
- Col des Ares
- Juzet-d'Izaut
- Col de Portet d'Aspet
- Saint-Lary
- Audressein
- Saint-Girons
- Massat
- Col de Port
- Tarascon-sur-Ariège

Common with RN 20

- Ur
- Font-Romeu
- Mont-Louis

Common with RN 116

- Bouleternère
- Amélie-les-Bains-Palalda

Common with the former RN 115

- Céret
- Le Boulou
- Argelès-sur-Mer
- Argelès Plage
