= Saint-Lary, Ariège =

Commune in Occitanie, France

Saint-Lary
- Commune
- Coat of arms
- Location of Saint-Lary
- Location within France Location within Occitanie
- Coordinates: 42°55′48″N 0°53′42″E
- Country: France
- Region: Occitania
- Department: Ariège
- Arrondissement: Saint-Girons
- Canton: Couserans Ouest

Government
  - Mayor (2020–2026): Gérard Dubuc
- Area^{1}: 33.91 km^{2} (13.09 sq mi)
- Elevation: 692 m (2,270 ft)
- Highest elevation: 2,209 m (7,247 ft)
- Lowest elevation: 654 m (2,146 ft)
- Population (2023): 156
  - Density: 4.60/km^{2} (11.9/sq mi)
- Time zone: UTC+01:00 (CET)
  - Summer (DST): UTC+02:00 (CEST)
- INSEE/Postal code: 09267 /09800
- ^{1} French Land Register data, which excludes lakes, ponds, glaciers > 1 km^{2} (0.386 sq mi or 247 acres) and river estuaries.

Saint-Lary (French pronunciation: [sɛ̃ laʁi]; Gascon: Sent Lari) is a commune in the Ariège department in southwestern France.

It is located on the former Route nationale 618, the "Route of the Pyrenees".

== Population ==
Inhabitants of Saint-Lary are called Saint-Hilariens in French.

Historical population
Year	Pop.	±% p.a.
1968	245	—
1975	165	−5.49%
1982	147	−1.64%
1990	133	−1.24%
1999	136	+0.25%
2007	153	+1.48%
2012	134	−2.62%
2017	131	−0.45%
2023	156	+2.95%
Source: INSEE

== See also ==
- Communes of the Ariège department
