= 2024 Tour de France, Stage 12 to Stage 21 =

The 2024 Tour de France was the 111th edition of the Tour de France. It started in Florence, Italy, on 29 June, and finished in Nice, France, on 21 July. The race did not finish in (or near) Paris for the first time since its inception, owing to preparations for the 2024 Summer Olympics in Paris.

== Classification standings ==
Legend
Denotes the leader of the general classification	Denotes the leader of the mountains classification
Denotes the leader of the points classification	Denotes the leader of the young rider classification
Denotes the leader of the team classification	Denotes the winner of the combativity award

== Stage 12 ==
11 July 2024 – Aurillac to Villeneuve-sur-Lot, 203.6 km (126.5 mi)

Stage 12 Result
Rank	Rider	Team	Time
1	Biniam Girmay (ERI)	Intermarché–Wanty	4h 17' 15"
2	Wout van Aert (BEL)	Visma–Lease a Bike	+ 0"
3	Pascal Ackermann (GER)	Israel–Premier Tech	+ 0"
4	Jasper Philipsen (BEL)	Alpecin–Deceuninck	+ 0"
5	Arnaud De Lie (BEL)	Lotto–Dstny	+ 0"
6	Alexander Kristoff (NOR)	Uno-X Mobility	+ 0"
7	Phil Bauhaus (GER)	Team Bahrain Victorious	+ 0"
8	Bryan Coquard (FRA)	Cofidis	+ 0"
9	Dylan Groenewegen (NED)	Team Jayco–AlUla	+ 0"
10	Ryan Gibbons (RSA)	Lidl–Trek	+ 0"

General classification after Stage 12
Rank	Rider	Team	Time
1	Tadej Pogačar (SLO)	UAE Team Emirates	49h 17' 49"
2	Remco Evenepoel (BEL)	Soudal–Quick-Step	+ 1' 06"
3	Jonas Vingegaard (DEN)	Visma–Lease a Bike	+ 1' 14"
4	João Almeida (POR)	UAE Team Emirates	+ 4' 20"
5	Carlos Rodríguez (ESP)	Ineos Grenadiers	+ 4' 40"
6	Primož Roglič (SLO)	Red Bull–Bora–Hansgrohe	+ 4' 42"
7	Mikel Landa (ESP)	Soudal–Quick-Step	+ 5' 38"
8	Adam Yates (GBR)	UAE Team Emirates	+ 6' 59"
9	Juan Ayuso (ESP)	UAE Team Emirates	+ 7' 09"
10	Giulio Ciccone (ITA)	Lidl–Trek	+ 7' 36"

== Stage 13 ==
12 July 2024 – Agen to Pau, 165.3 km (102.7 mi)

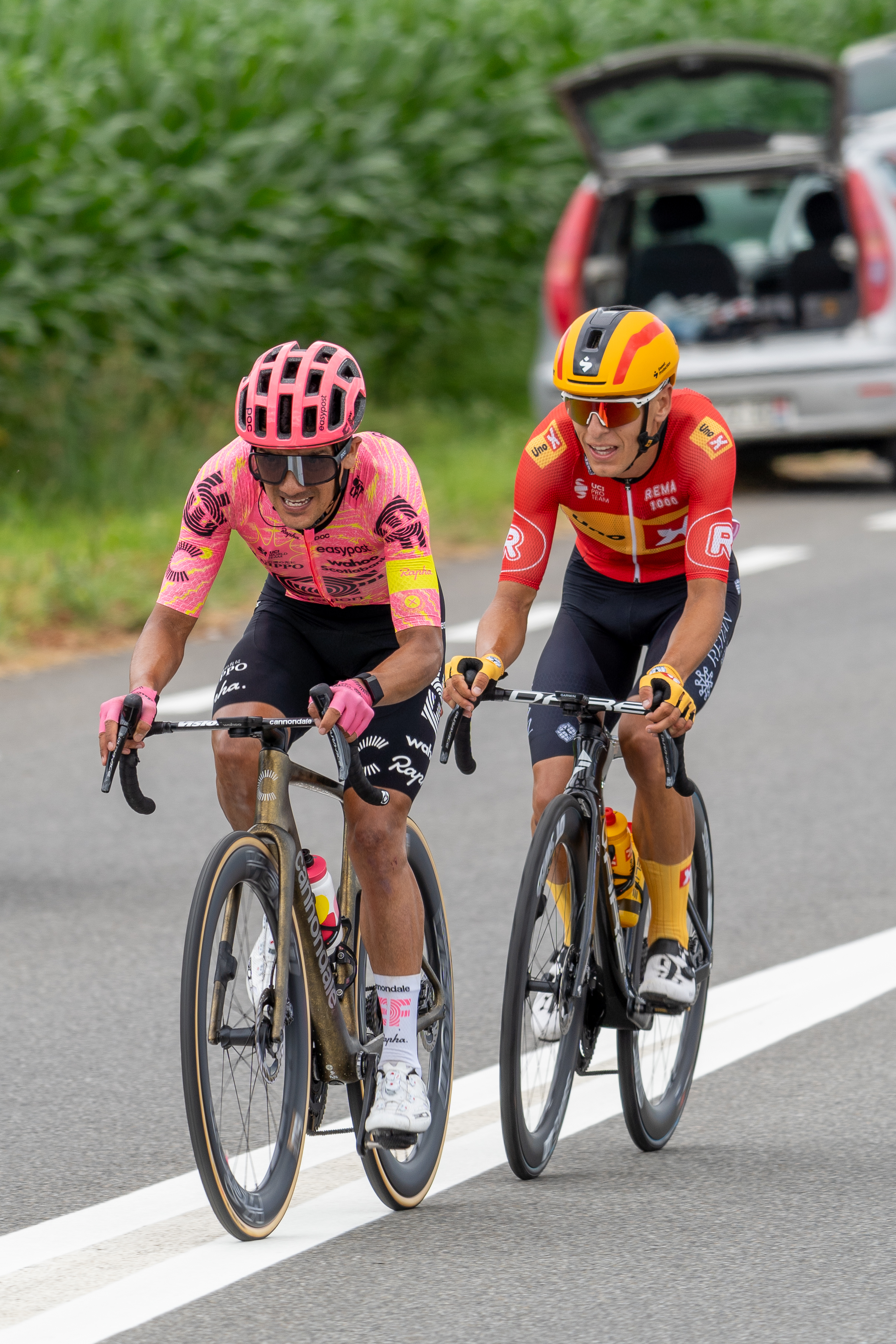
Breakaway of Richard Carapaz and Tobias Halland Johannessen

Stage 13 Result
Rank	Rider	Team	Time
1	Jasper Philipsen (BEL)	Alpecin–Deceuninck	3h 23' 09"
2	Wout van Aert (BEL)	Visma–Lease a Bike	+ 0"
3	Pascal Ackermann (GER)	Israel–Premier Tech	+ 0"
4	Biniam Girmay (ERI)	Intermarché–Wanty	+ 0"
5	Nikias Arndt (GER)	Team Bahrain Victorious	+ 0"
6	Jasper Stuyven (BEL)	Lidl–Trek	+ 0"
7	Clément Russo (FRA)	Groupama–FDJ	+ 0"
8	Bryan Coquard (FRA)	Cofidis	+ 0"
9	Tadej Pogačar (SLO)	UAE Team Emirates	+ 0"
10	Søren Wærenskjold (NOR)	Uno-X Mobility	+ 0"

General classification after Stage 13
Rank	Rider	Team	Time
1	Tadej Pogačar (SLO)	UAE Team Emirates	52h 40' 58"
2	Remco Evenepoel (BEL)	Soudal–Quick-Step	+ 1' 06"
3	Jonas Vingegaard (DEN)	Visma–Lease a Bike	+ 1' 14"
4	João Almeida (POR)	UAE Team Emirates	+ 4' 20"
5	Carlos Rodríguez (ESP)	Ineos Grenadiers	+ 4' 40"
6	Mikel Landa (ESP)	Soudal–Quick-Step	+ 5' 38"
7	Adam Yates (GBR)	UAE Team Emirates	+ 6' 59"
8	Giulio Ciccone (ITA)	Lidl–Trek	+ 7' 36"
9	Derek Gee (CAN)	Israel–Premier Tech	+ 7' 54"
10	Matteo Jorgenson (USA)	Visma–Lease a Bike	+ 8' 56"

== Stage 14 ==
13 July 2024 – Pau to Saint-Lary-Soulan (Pla d'Adet), 151.9 km (94.4 mi)

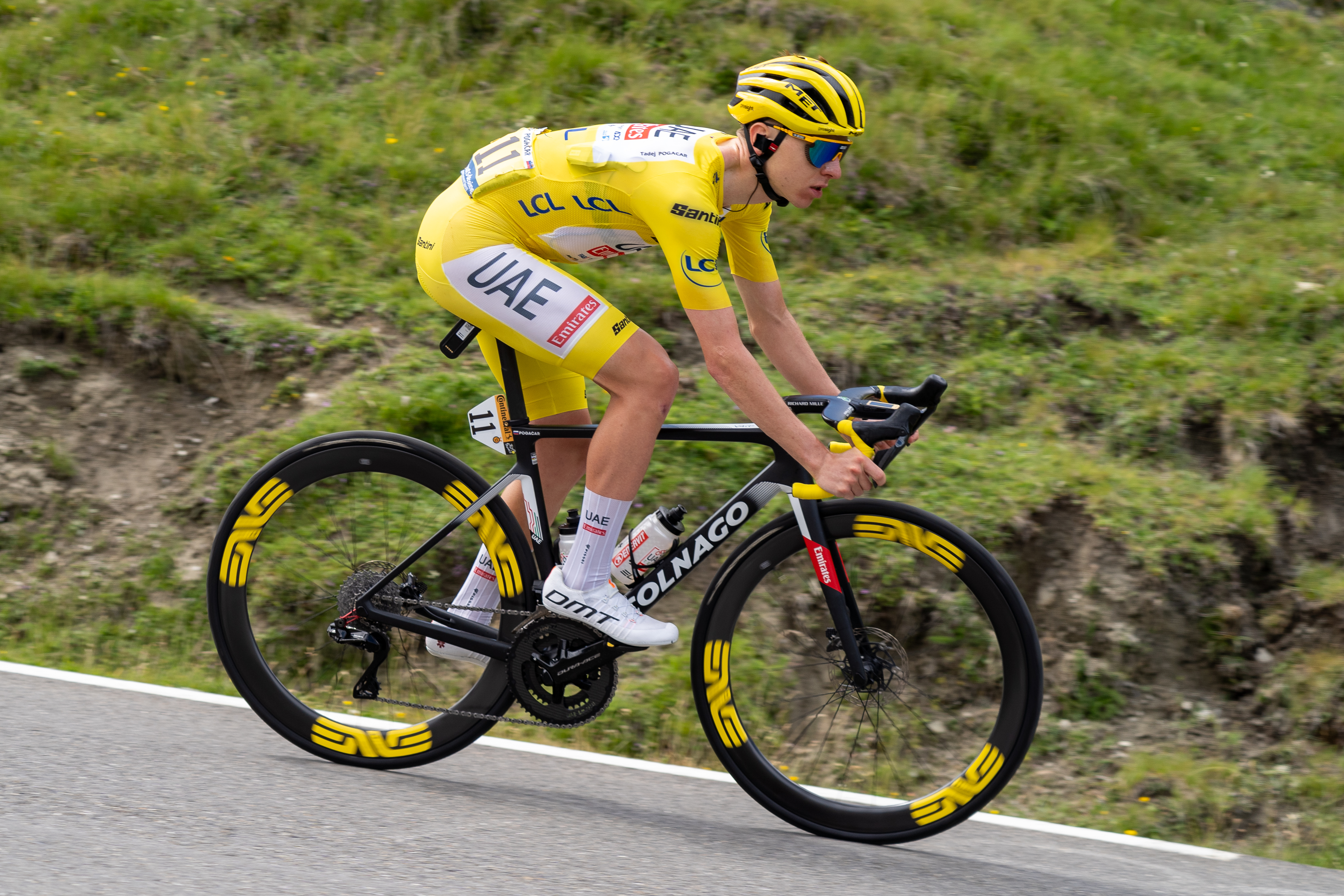
Tadej Pogačar in the yellow jersey descending the Col du Tourmalet

Stage 14 Result
Rank	Rider	Team	Time
1	Tadej Pogačar (SLO)	UAE Team Emirates	4h 01' 51"
2	Jonas Vingegaard (DEN)	Visma–Lease a Bike	+ 39"
3	Remco Evenepoel (BEL)	Soudal–Quick-Step	+ 1' 10"
4	Carlos Rodríguez (ESP)	Ineos Grenadiers	+ 1' 19"
5	Giulio Ciccone (ITA)	Lidl–Trek	+ 1' 23"
6	Santiago Buitrago (COL)	Team Bahrain Victorious	+ 1' 23"
7	Adam Yates (GBR)	UAE Team Emirates	+ 1' 23"
8	Felix Gall (AUT)	Decathlon–AG2R La Mondiale	+ 1' 26"
9	Matteo Jorgenson (USA)	Visma–Lease a Bike	+ 1' 29"
10	Derek Gee (CAN)	Israel–Premier Tech	+ 1' 29"

General classification after Stage 14
Rank	Rider	Team	Time
1	Tadej Pogačar (SLO)	UAE Team Emirates	56h 42' 39"
2	Jonas Vingegaard (DEN)	Visma–Lease a Bike	+ 1' 57"
3	Remco Evenepoel (BEL)	Soudal–Quick-Step	+ 2' 22"
4	João Almeida (POR)	UAE Team Emirates	+ 6' 01"
5	Carlos Rodríguez (ESP)	Ineos Grenadiers	+ 6' 09"
6	Mikel Landa (ESP)	Soudal–Quick-Step	+ 7' 17"
7	Adam Yates (GBR)	UAE Team Emirates	+ 8' 32"
8	Giulio Ciccone (ITA)	Lidl–Trek	+ 9' 09"
9	Derek Gee (CAN)	Israel–Premier Tech	+ 9' 33"
10	Matteo Jorgenson (USA)	Visma–Lease a Bike	+ 10' 35"

== Stage 15 ==
14 July 2024 – Loudenvielle to Plateau de Beille, 197.7 km (122.8 mi)

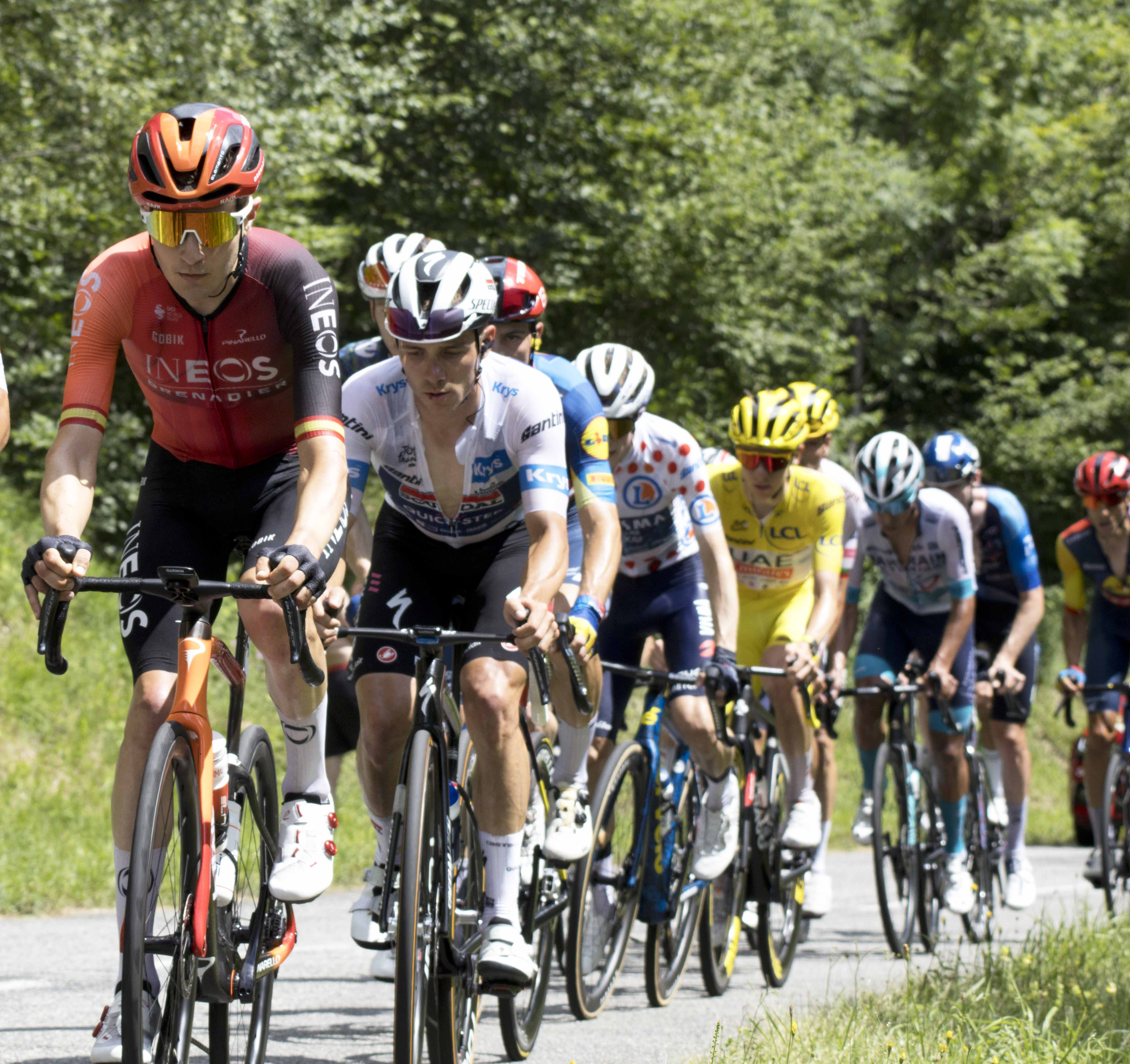
Group of favourites on stage 15

Stage 15 Result
Rank	Rider	Team	Time
1	Tadej Pogačar (SLO)	UAE Team Emirates	5h 13' 55"
2	Jonas Vingegaard (DEN)	Visma–Lease a Bike	+ 1' 08"
3	Remco Evenepoel (BEL)	Soudal–Quick-Step	+ 2' 51"
4	Mikel Landa (ESP)	Soudal–Quick-Step	+ 3' 54"
5	João Almeida (POR)	UAE Team Emirates	+ 4' 43"
6	Adam Yates (GBR)	UAE Team Emirates	+ 4' 56"
7	Santiago Buitrago (COL)	Team Bahrain Victorious	+ 5' 08"
8	Carlos Rodríguez (ESP)	Ineos Grenadiers	+ 5' 08"
9	Richard Carapaz (ECU)	EF Education–EasyPost	+ 5' 41"
10	Felix Gall (AUT)	Decathlon–AG2R La Mondiale	+ 5' 57"

General classification after Stage 15
Rank	Rider	Team	Time
1	Tadej Pogačar (SLO)	UAE Team Emirates	61h 56' 24"
2	Jonas Vingegaard (DEN)	Visma–Lease a Bike	+ 3' 09"
3	Remco Evenepoel (BEL)	Soudal–Quick-Step	+ 5' 19"
4	João Almeida (POR)	UAE Team Emirates	+ 10' 54"
5	Mikel Landa (ESP)	Soudal–Quick-Step	+ 11' 21"
6	Carlos Rodríguez (ESP)	Ineos Grenadiers	+ 11' 27"
7	Adam Yates (GBR)	UAE Team Emirates	+ 13' 38"
8	Giulio Ciccone (ITA)	Lidl–Trek	+ 15' 48"
9	Derek Gee (CAN)	Israel–Premier Tech	+ 16' 12"
10	Santiago Buitrago (COL)	Team Bahrain Victorious	+ 16' 32"

== Rest day 2 ==
15 July 2024 – Gruissan

== Stage 16 ==
16 July 2024 – Gruissan to Nîmes, 188.6 km (117.2 mi)

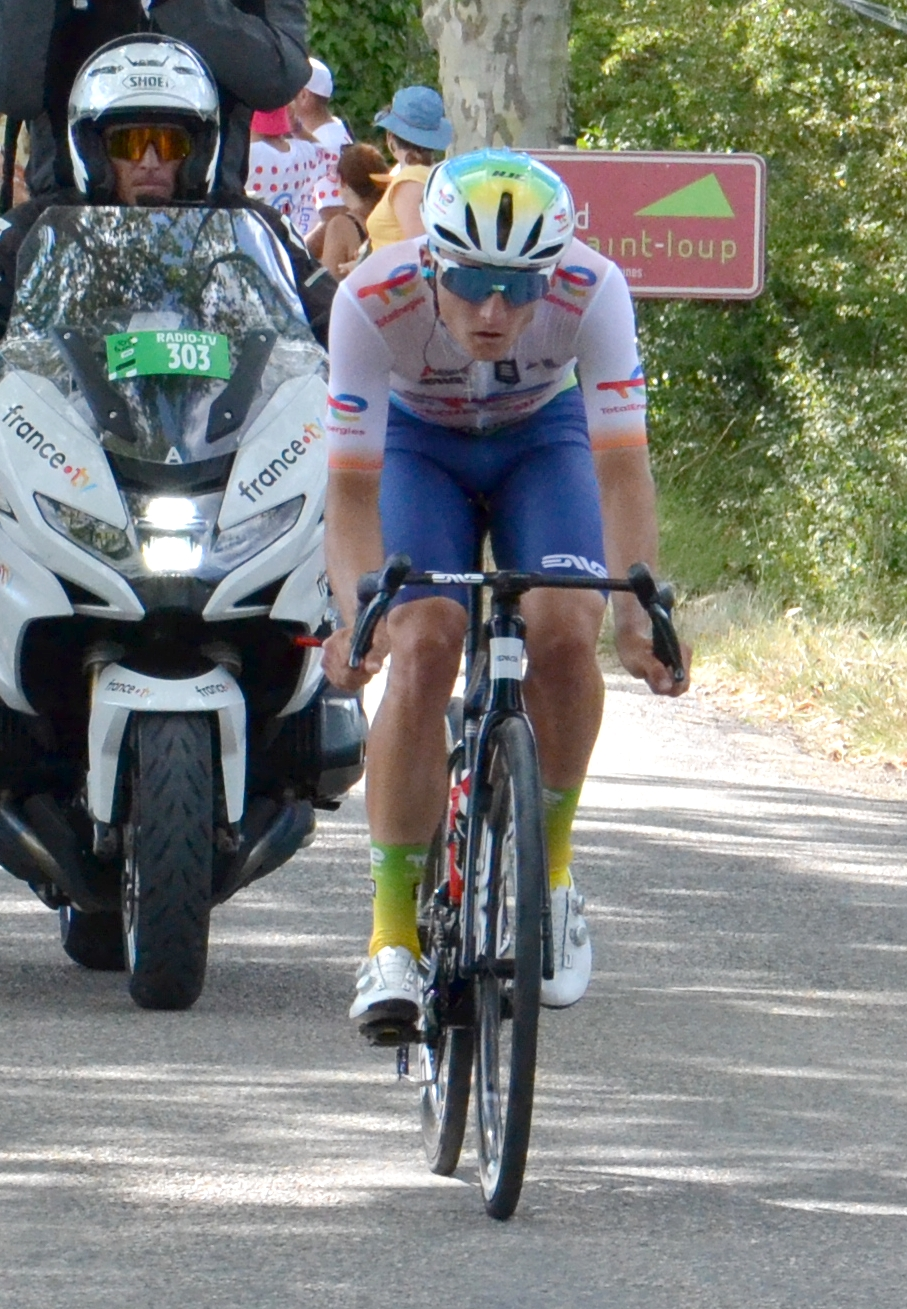
Thomas Gachignard, the breakaway rider of stage 16

Stage 16 Result
Rank	Rider	Team	Time
1	Jasper Philipsen (BEL)	Alpecin–Deceuninck	4h 11' 27"
2	Phil Bauhaus (GER)	Team Bahrain Victorious	+ 0"
3	Alexander Kristoff (NOR)	Uno-X Mobility	+ 0"
4	Sam Bennett (IRL)	Decathlon–AG2R La Mondiale	+ 0"
5	Wout van Aert (BEL)	Visma–Lease a Bike	+ 0"
6	Pascal Ackermann (GER)	Israel–Premier Tech	+ 0"
7	Bryan Coquard (FRA)	Cofidis	+ 0"
8	Søren Wærenskjold (NOR)	Uno-X Mobility	+ 0"
9	Ryan Gibbons (RSA)	Lidl–Trek	+ 0"
10	Danny van Poppel (NED)	Red Bull–Bora–Hansgrohe	+ 0"

General classification after Stage 16
Rank	Rider	Team	Time
1	Tadej Pogačar (SLO)	UAE Team Emirates	66h 07' 51"
2	Jonas Vingegaard (DEN)	Visma–Lease a Bike	+ 3' 09"
3	Remco Evenepoel (BEL)	Soudal–Quick-Step	+ 5' 19"
4	João Almeida (POR)	UAE Team Emirates	+ 10' 54"
5	Mikel Landa (ESP)	Soudal–Quick-Step	+ 11' 21"
6	Carlos Rodríguez (ESP)	Ineos Grenadiers	+ 11' 27"
7	Adam Yates (GBR)	UAE Team Emirates	+ 13' 38"
8	Giulio Ciccone (ITA)	Lidl–Trek	+ 15' 48"
9	Derek Gee (CAN)	Israel–Premier Tech	+ 16' 12"
10	Santiago Buitrago (COL)	Team Bahrain Victorious	+ 16' 32"

== Stage 17 ==
17 July 2024 – Saint-Paul-Trois-Châteaux to SuperDévoluy, 177.8 km (110.5 mi)

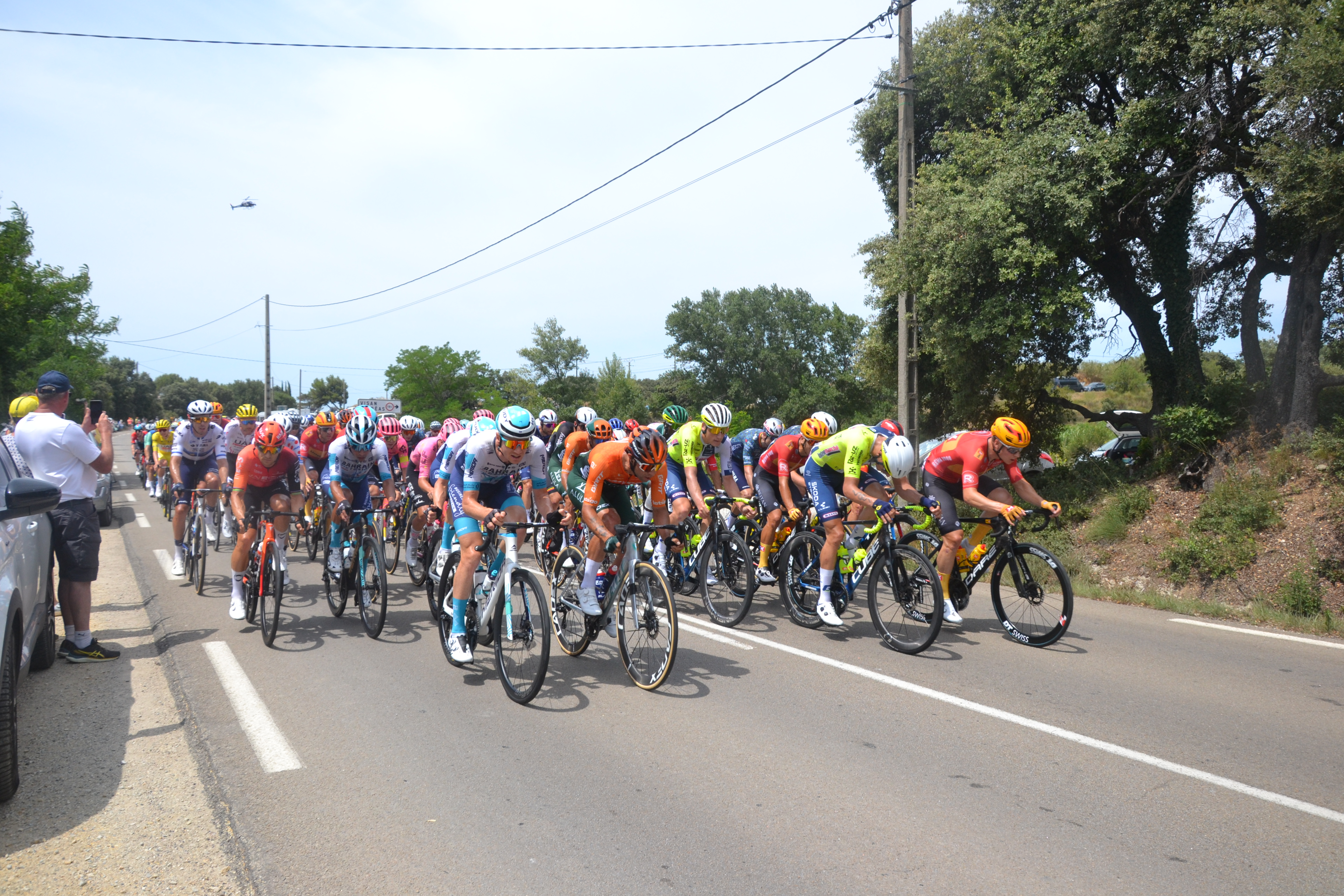
Peloton on stage 17

Stage 17 Result
Rank	Rider	Team	Time
1	Richard Carapaz (ECU)	EF Education–EasyPost	4h 06' 13"
2	Simon Yates (GBR)	Team Jayco–AlUla	+ 37"
3	Enric Mas (ESP)	Movistar Team	+ 57"
4	Laurens De Plus (BEL)	Ineos Grenadiers	+ 1' 44"
5	Oscar Onley (GBR)	Team dsm–firmenich PostNL	+ 1' 44"
6	Guillaume Martin (FRA)	Cofidis	+ 2' 36"
7	Magnus Cort (DEN)	Uno-X Mobility	+ 2' 38"
8	Wout Poels (NED)	Team Bahrain Victorious	+ 2' 39"
9	Jordan Jegat (FRA)	Team TotalEnergies	+ 2' 39"
10	Alex Aranburu (ESP)	Movistar Team	+ 2' 39"

General classification after Stage 17
Rank	Rider	Team	Time
1	Tadej Pogačar (SLO)	UAE Team Emirates	70h 21' 27"
2	Jonas Vingegaard (DEN)	Visma–Lease a Bike	+ 3' 11"
3	Remco Evenepoel (BEL)	Soudal–Quick-Step	+ 5' 09"
4	João Almeida (POR)	UAE Team Emirates	+ 12' 57"
5	Mikel Landa (ESP)	Soudal–Quick-Step	+ 13' 24"
6	Carlos Rodríguez (ESP)	Ineos Grenadiers	+ 13' 30"
7	Adam Yates (GBR)	UAE Team Emirates	+ 15' 41"
8	Giulio Ciccone (ITA)	Lidl–Trek	+ 17' 51"
9	Derek Gee (CAN)	Israel–Premier Tech	+ 18' 15"
10	Santiago Buitrago (COL)	Team Bahrain Victorious	+ 18' 35"

== Stage 18 ==
18 July 2024 – Gap to Barcelonnette, 179.5 km (111.5 mi)

Stage 18 Result
Rank	Rider	Team	Time
1	Victor Campenaerts (BEL)	Lotto–Dstny	4h 10' 20"
2	Mattéo Vercher (FRA)	Team TotalEnergies	+ 0"
3	Michał Kwiatkowski (POL)	Ineos Grenadiers	+ 0"
4	Toms Skujiņš (LAT)	Lidl–Trek	+ 22"
5	Oier Lazkano (ESP)	Movistar Team	+ 22"
6	Bart Lemmen (NED)	Visma–Lease a Bike	+ 22"
7	Krists Neilands (LAT)	Israel–Premier Tech	+ 22"
8	Jai Hindley (AUS)	Red Bull–Bora–Hansgrohe	+ 22"
9	Wout van Aert (BEL)	Visma–Lease a Bike	+ 37"
10	Michael Matthews (AUS)	Team Jayco–AlUla	+ 37"

General classification after Stage 18
Rank	Rider	Team	Time
1	Tadej Pogačar (SLO)	UAE Team Emirates	74h 45' 27"
2	Jonas Vingegaard (DEN)	Visma–Lease a Bike	+ 3' 11"
3	Remco Evenepoel (BEL)	Soudal–Quick-Step	+ 5' 09"
4	João Almeida (POR)	UAE Team Emirates	+ 12' 57"
5	Mikel Landa (ESP)	Soudal–Quick-Step	+ 13' 24"
6	Carlos Rodríguez (ESP)	Ineos Grenadiers	+ 13' 30"
7	Adam Yates (GBR)	UAE Team Emirates	+ 15' 41"
8	Giulio Ciccone (ITA)	Lidl–Trek	+ 17' 51"
9	Derek Gee (CAN)	Israel–Premier Tech	+ 18' 15"
10	Santiago Buitrago (COL)	Team Bahrain Victorious	+ 18' 35"

== Stage 19 ==
19 July 2024 – Embrun to Isola 2000, 144.6 km (89.9 mi)

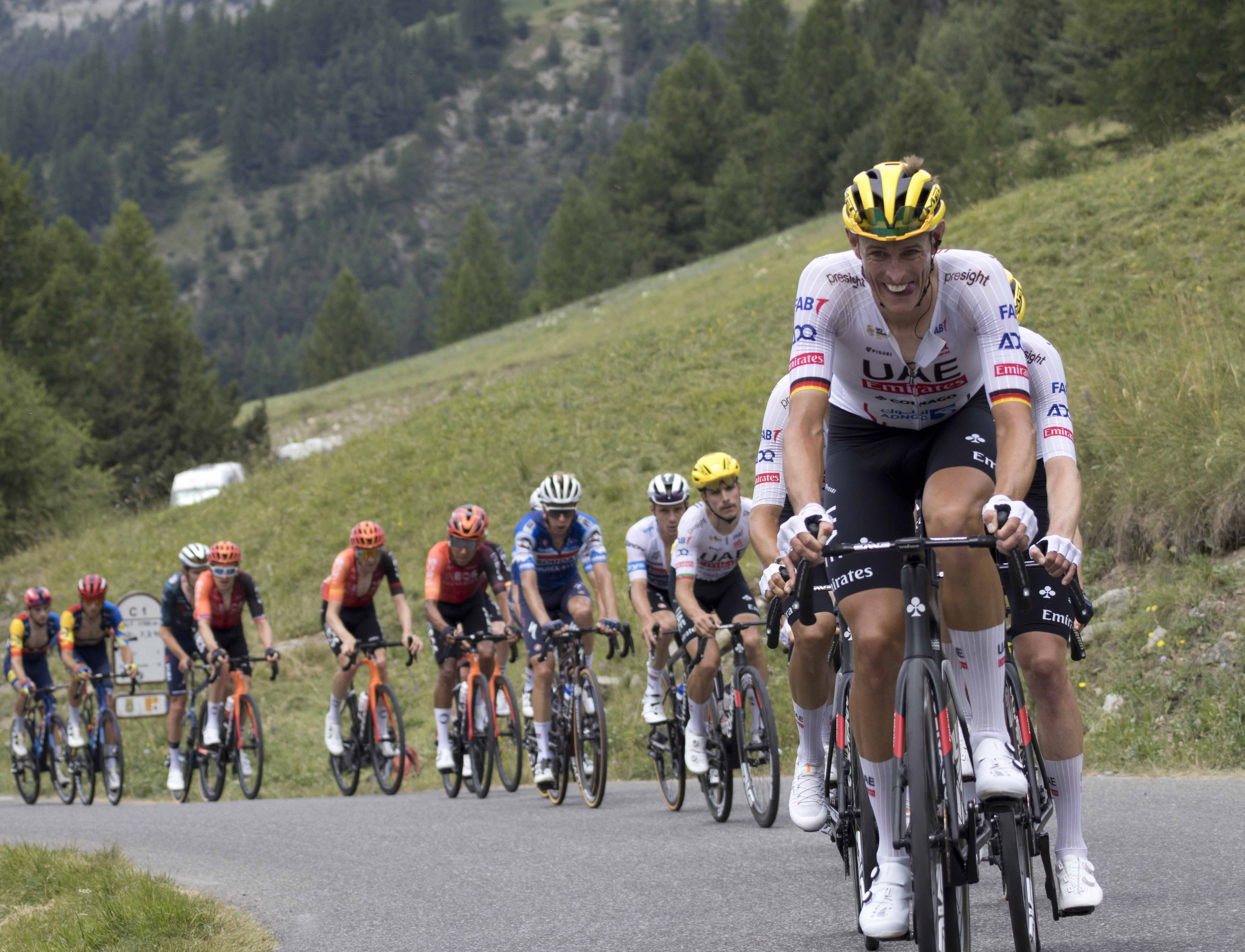
Riders on stage 19, being led by Nils Politt

Stage 19 Result
Rank	Rider	Team	Time
1	Tadej Pogačar (SLO)	UAE Team Emirates	4h 04' 03"
2	Matteo Jorgenson (USA)	Visma–Lease a Bike	+ 21"
3	Simon Yates (GBR)	Team Jayco–AlUla	+ 40"
4	Richard Carapaz (ECU)	EF Education–EasyPost	+ 1' 11"
5	Remco Evenepoel (BEL)	Soudal–Quick-Step	+ 1' 42"
6	Jonas Vingegaard (DEN)	Visma–Lease a Bike	+ 1' 42"
7	João Almeida (POR)	UAE Team Emirates	+ 2' 00"
8	Mikel Landa (ESP)	Soudal–Quick-Step	+ 2' 00"
9	Wilco Kelderman (NED)	Visma–Lease a Bike	+ 2' 52"
10	Derek Gee (CAN)	Israel–Premier Tech	+ 3' 27"

General classification after Stage 19
Rank	Rider	Team	Time
1	Tadej Pogačar (SLO)	UAE Team Emirates	78h 49' 20"
2	Jonas Vingegaard (DEN)	Visma–Lease a Bike	+ 5' 03"
3	Remco Evenepoel (BEL)	Soudal–Quick-Step	+ 7' 01"
4	João Almeida (POR)	UAE Team Emirates	+ 15' 07"
5	Mikel Landa (ESP)	Soudal–Quick-Step	+ 15' 34"
6	Carlos Rodríguez (ESP)	Ineos Grenadiers	+ 17' 36"
7	Adam Yates (GBR)	UAE Team Emirates	+ 19' 18"
8	Derek Gee (CAN)	Israel–Premier Tech	+ 21' 52"
9	Matteo Jorgenson (USA)	Visma–Lease a Bike	+ 22' 43"
10	Giulio Ciccone (ITA)	Lidl–Trek	+ 22' 46"

== Stage 20 ==
20 July 2024 – Nice to Col de la Couillole, 132.8 km (82.5 mi)

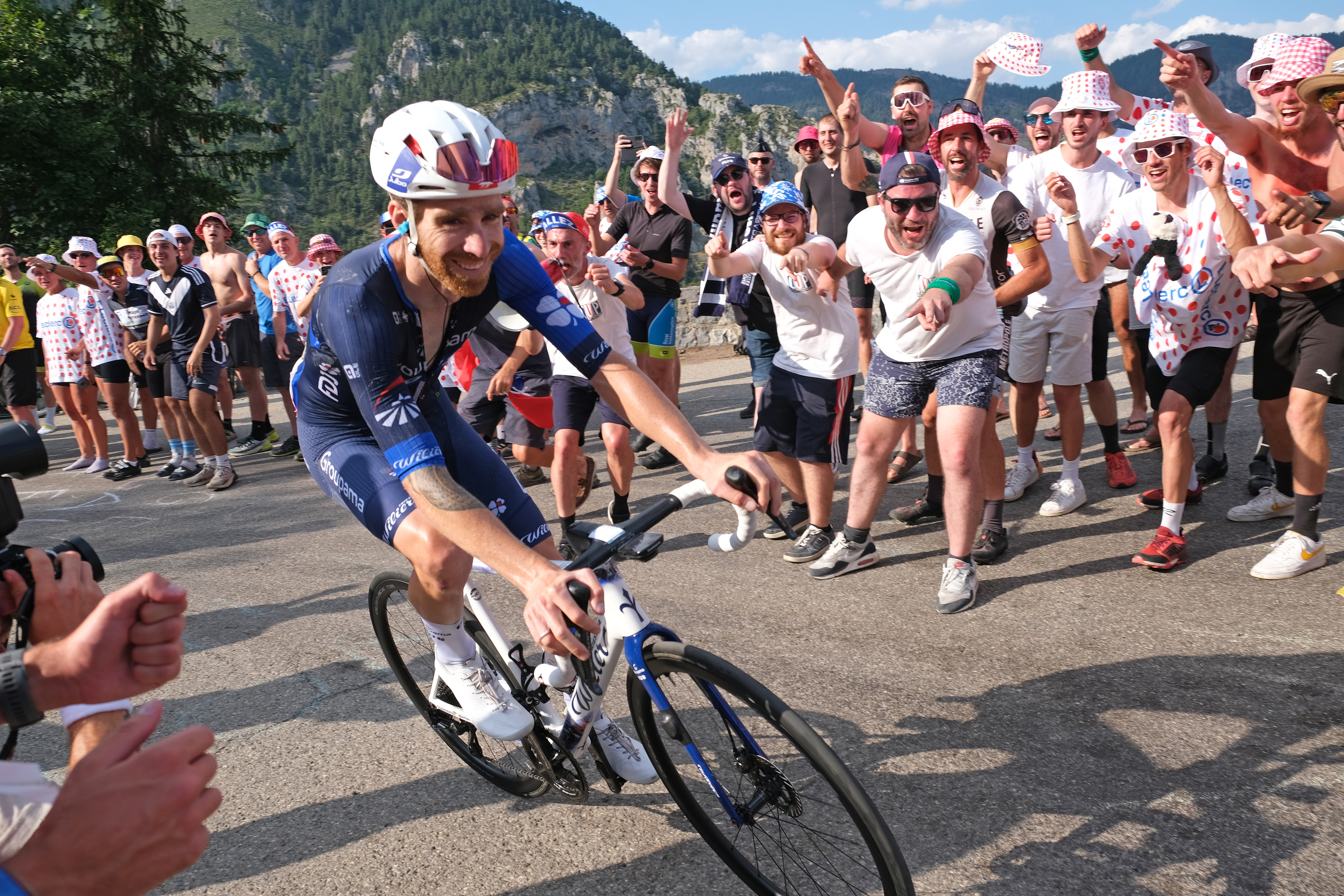
Spectators, some of them from the Thibaut Pinot supporter group, cheering for French rider Quentin Pacher

Stage 20 Result
Rank	Rider	Team	Time
1	Tadej Pogačar (SLO)	UAE Team Emirates	4h 04' 22"
2	Jonas Vingegaard (DEN)	Visma–Lease a Bike	+ 7"
3	Richard Carapaz (ECU)	EF Education–EasyPost	+ 23"
4	Remco Evenepoel (BEL)	Soudal–Quick-Step	+ 53"
5	Enric Mas (ESP)	Movistar Team	+ 1' 07"
6	João Almeida (POR)	UAE Team Emirates	+ 1' 28"
7	Matteo Jorgenson (USA)	Visma–Lease a Bike	+ 1' 33"
8	Mikel Landa (ESP)	Soudal–Quick-Step	+ 1' 41"
9	Adam Yates (GBR)	UAE Team Emirates	+ 1' 43"
10	Romain Bardet (FRA)	Team dsm–firmenich PostNL	+ 1' 52"

General classification after Stage 20
Rank	Rider	Team	Time
1	Tadej Pogačar (SLO)	UAE Team Emirates	82h 53' 32"
2	Jonas Vingegaard (DEN)	Visma–Lease a Bike	+ 5' 14"
3	Remco Evenepoel (BEL)	Soudal–Quick-Step	+ 8' 04"
4	João Almeida (POR)	UAE Team Emirates	+ 16' 45"
5	Mikel Landa (ESP)	Soudal–Quick-Step	+ 17' 25"
6	Adam Yates (GBR)	UAE Team Emirates	+ 21' 11"
7	Carlos Rodríguez (ESP)	Ineos Grenadiers	+ 21' 12"
8	Matteo Jorgenson (USA)	Visma–Lease a Bike	+ 24' 26"
9	Derek Gee (CAN)	Israel–Premier Tech	+ 24' 50"
10	Giulio Ciccone (ITA)	Lidl–Trek	+ 25' 48"

== Stage 21 ==
21 July 2024 – Monaco to Nice, 33.7 km (20.9 mi)

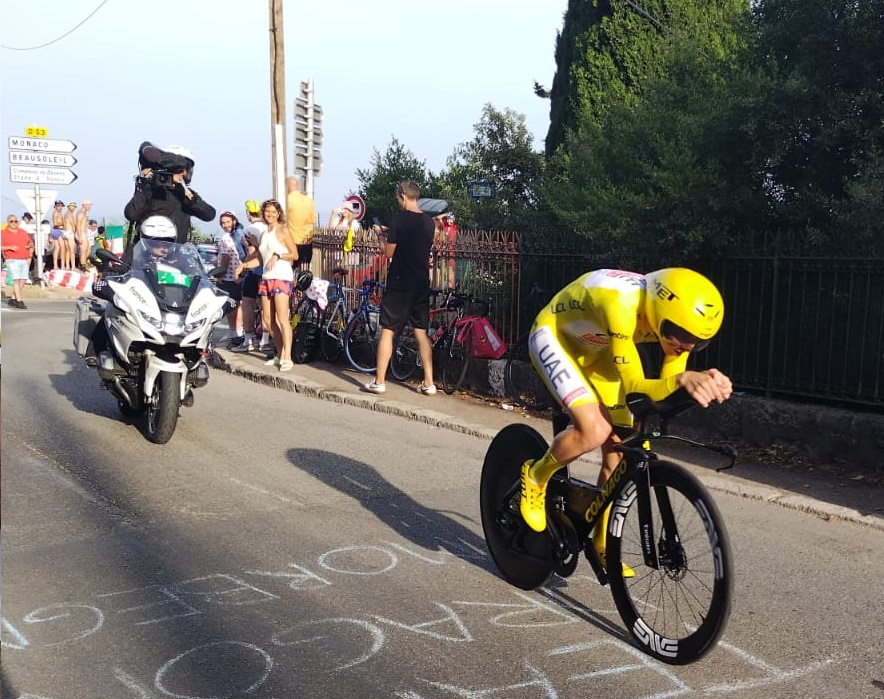
Tadej Pogačar riding the individual time trial in the yellow jersey

Stage 21 Result
Rank	Rider	Team	Time
1	Tadej Pogačar (SLO)	UAE Team Emirates	45' 24"
2	Jonas Vingegaard (DEN)	Visma–Lease a Bike	+ 1' 03"
3	Remco Evenepoel (BEL)	Soudal–Quick-Step	+ 1' 14"
4	Matteo Jorgenson (USA)	Visma–Lease a Bike	+ 2' 08"
5	João Almeida (POR)	UAE Team Emirates	+ 2' 18"
6	Derek Gee (CAN)	Israel–Premier Tech	+ 2' 31"
7	Mikel Landa (ESP)	Soudal–Quick-Step	+ 2' 41"
8	Harold Tejada (COL)	Astana Qazaqstan Team	+ 2' 50"
9	Santiago Buitrago (COL)	Team Bahrain Victorious	+ 2' 53"
10	Adam Yates (GBR)	UAE Team Emirates	+ 2' 56"

General classification after Stage 21
Rank	Rider	Team	Time
1	Tadej Pogačar (SLO)	UAE Team Emirates	83h 38' 56"
2	Jonas Vingegaard (DEN)	Visma–Lease a Bike	+ 6' 17"
3	Remco Evenepoel (BEL)	Soudal–Quick-Step	+ 9' 18"
4	João Almeida (POR)	UAE Team Emirates	+ 19' 03"
5	Mikel Landa (ESP)	Soudal–Quick-Step	+ 20' 06"
6	Adam Yates (GBR)	UAE Team Emirates	+ 24' 07"
7	Carlos Rodríguez (ESP)	Ineos Grenadiers	+ 25' 04"
8	Matteo Jorgenson (USA)	Visma–Lease a Bike	+ 26' 34"
9	Derek Gee (CAN)	Israel–Premier Tech	+ 27' 21"
10	Santiago Buitrago (COL)	Team Bahrain Victorious	+ 29' 03"
