= Pla d'Adet =

Ski resort in the Pyrenees, France

Pla d'Adet (Saint-Lary 1700)
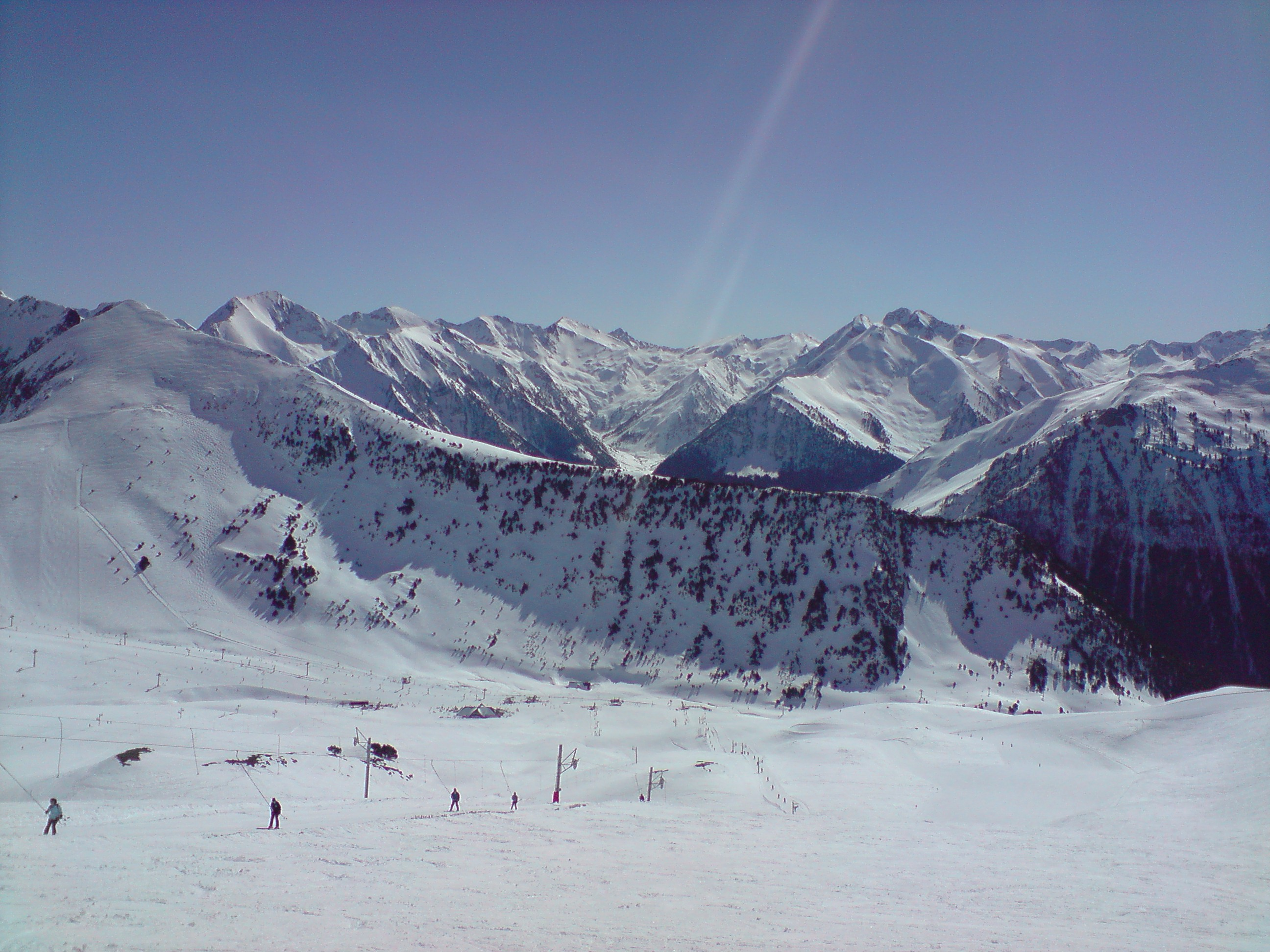
- An overview of the ski resort

- Location within France Location within Occitanie Location within Pyrenees
- Nearest city: Tarbes
- Coordinates: 42°48′55″N 0°17′30″E
- Top elevation: 3,194 m (10,479 ft)
- Base elevation: 830 m (2,720 ft)
- Trails: 55
- Lift system: 30
- Website: Website

Pla d'Adet or Saint-Lary 1700 is a ski resort in the French Pyrenees, in the department of Hautes-Pyrénées, and the Occitania region. The resort is situated above the village of Saint-Lary-Soulan, at an altitude of 1,680 metres (5,510 ft). The climb to the ski station is frequently used as a stage finish in the Tour de France cycle race.

== Skiing infrastructure ==
=== Ski area ===
- 55 ski slopes
- 30 lifts

== Cycle racing ==
=== Details of the climb ===
The climb to the ski station starts at Vignec, on the outskirts of Saint-Lary-Soulan. From here, the climb is 10.7 km (6.6 mi) long. Over this distance, the climb gains 861 m (2,825 ft) in altitude, at an average gradient of 8%, with several sections near the start of the climb in excess of 12%.

The finish line of the climb as used in the Tour de France is at 1,680 m (5,510 ft), although in 2005 this was at 1,669 m (5,476 ft).

The bottom section of the climb (4.6km) were used for the downhill Red Bull Road Rage race held on 12 September 2009. The race was won by Tour de France multiple stage winner and former yellow jersey wearer, Frédéric Moncassin.

=== Tour de France ===
The Tour de France has featured Pla d'Adet as a finish on 11 occasions since 1974, most recently in 2024.

Year	Stage	Start of stage	Distance (km)	Category	Stage winner	Yellow jersey
2024	14	Pau	151.9	HC	Tadej Pogačar (SLO)	Tadej Pogačar (SLO)
2014	17	Saint-Gaudens	124.5	HC	Rafał Majka (POL)	Vincenzo Nibali (ITA)
2005	15	Lézat-sur-Lèze	205	HC	~~George Hincapie~~ (USA)	~~Lance Armstrong~~ (USA)
2001	13	Foix	194	HC	~~Lance Armstrong~~ (USA)	~~Lance Armstrong~~ (USA)
1993	16	Andorra	230	1	Zenon Jaskuła (POL)	Miguel Indurain (ESP)
1982	13	Pau	122	HC	Beat Breu (SUI)	Bernard Hinault (FRA)
1981	6	Saint-Gaudens	117	HC	Lucien Van Impe (BEL)	Phil Anderson (AUS)
1978	11	Pau	161	1	Mariano Martínez (FRA)	Joseph Bruyère (BEL)
1976	14	Saint-Gaudens	139	1	Lucien Van Impe (BEL)	Lucien Van Impe (BEL)
1975	11	Pau	160	1	Joop Zoetemelk (NED)	Eddy Merckx (BEL)
1974	16	La Seu d'Urgell	209	1	Raymond Poulidor (FRA)	Eddy Merckx (BEL)

The beginning of the climb also has featured as the access road to the Col de Portet, which deviates from the main road taking a right turn at Espiaube.
