= 1950 =

1950 in various calendars
- Gregorian calendar: 1950; MCML
- Ab urbe condita: 2703
- Armenian calendar: 1399; ԹՎ ՌՅՂԹ
- Assyrian calendar: 6700
- Baháʼí calendar: 106–107
- Balinese saka calendar: 1871–1872
- Bengali calendar: 1356–1357
- Berber calendar: 2900
- British Regnal year: 14 Geo. 6 – 15 Geo. 6
- Buddhist calendar: 2494
- Burmese calendar: 1312
- Byzantine calendar: 7458–7459
- Chinese calendar: 己丑年 (Earth Ox); 4647 or 4440 — to — 庚寅年 (Metal Tiger); 4648 or 4441
- Coptic calendar: 1666–1667
- Discordian calendar: 3116
- Ethiopian calendar: 1942–1943
- Hebrew calendar: 5710–5711
- Hindu calendars
- Vikram Samvat: 2006–2007
- Shaka Samvat: 1871–1872
- Kali Yuga: 5050–5051
- Holocene calendar: 11950
- Igbo calendar: 950–951
- Iranian calendar: 1328–1329
- Islamic calendar: 1369–1370
- Japanese calendar: Shōwa 25 (昭和２５年)
- Javanese calendar: 1881–1882
- Juche calendar: 39
- Julian calendar: Gregorian minus 13 days
- Korean calendar: 4283
- Minguo calendar: ROC 39 民國39年
- Nanakshahi calendar: 482
- Thai solar calendar: 2493
- Tibetan calendar: ས་མོ་གླང་ལོ་ (female Earth-Ox); 2076 or 1695 or 923 — to — ལྕགས་ཕོ་སྟག་ལོ་ (male Iron-Tiger); 2077 or 1696 or 924

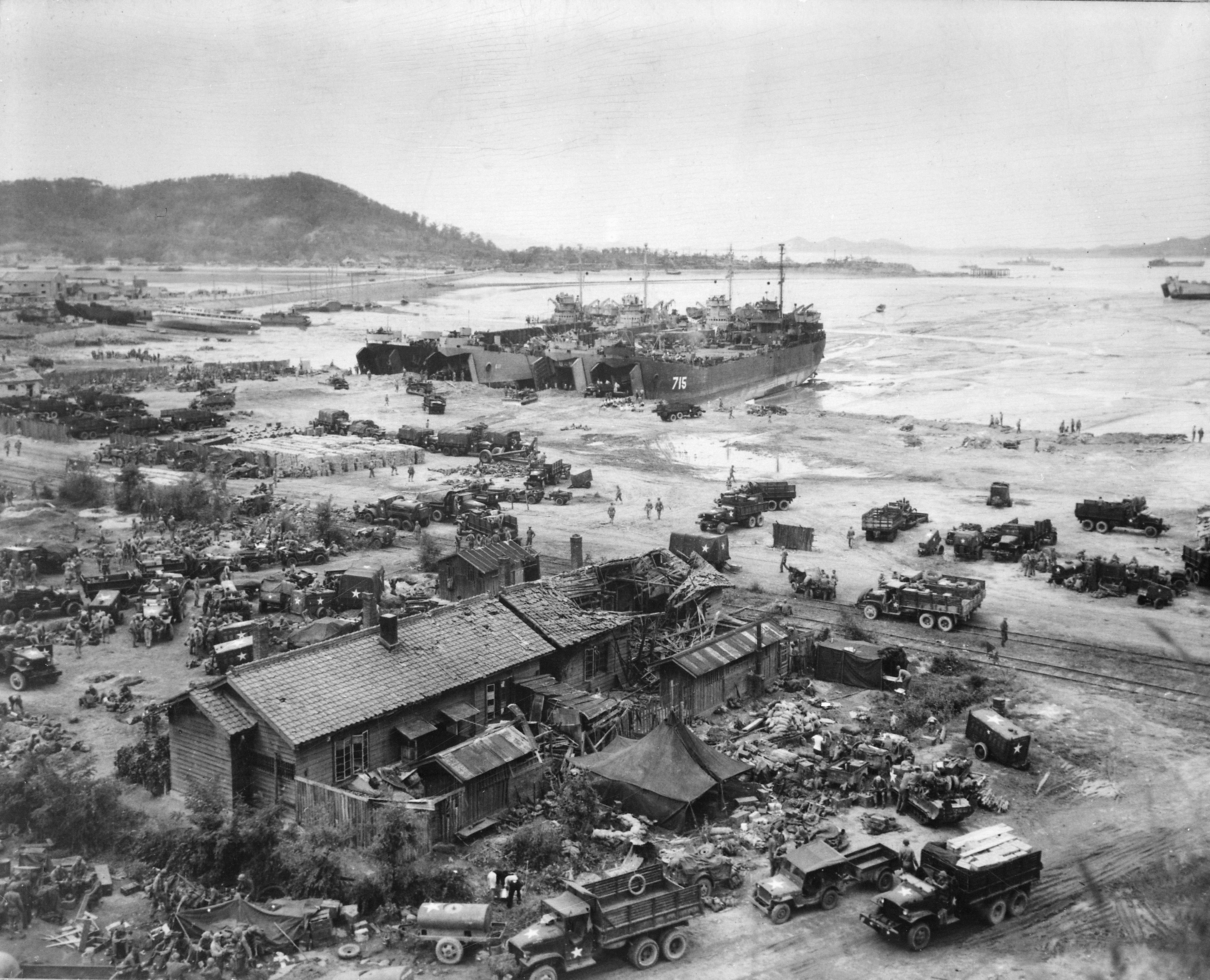
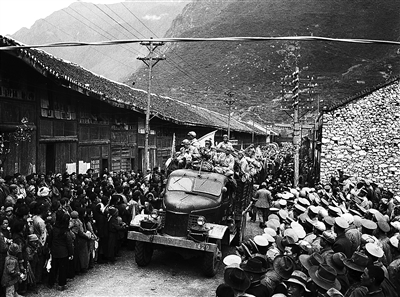
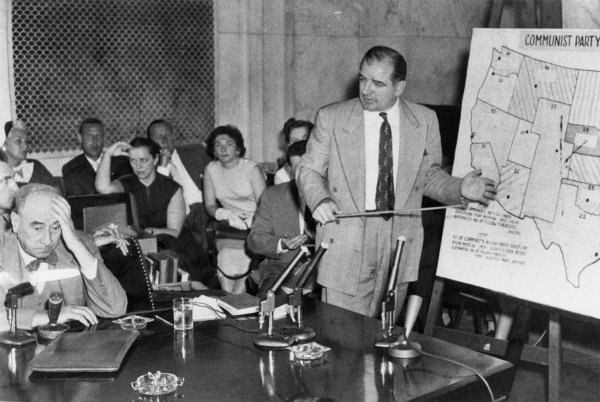
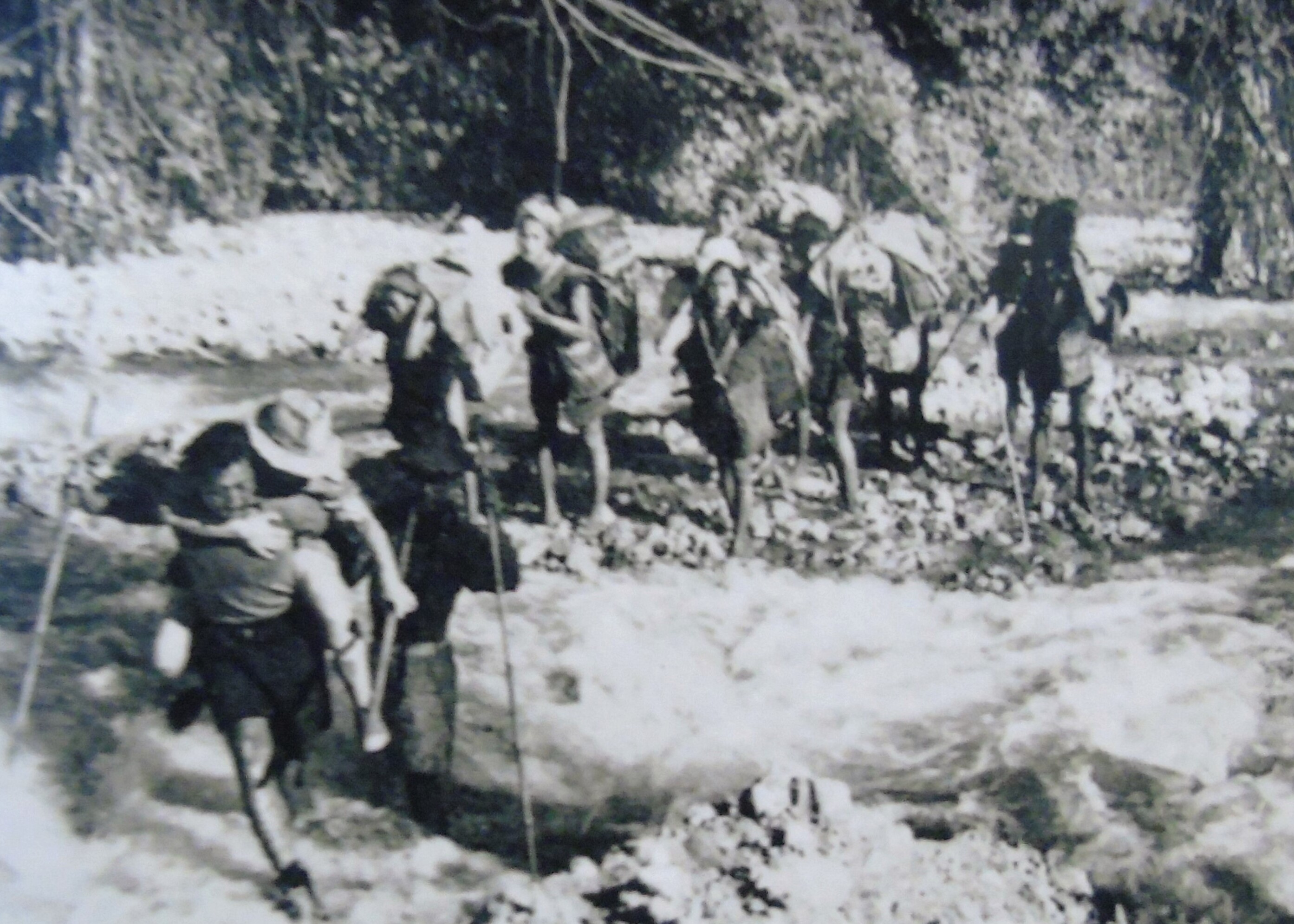
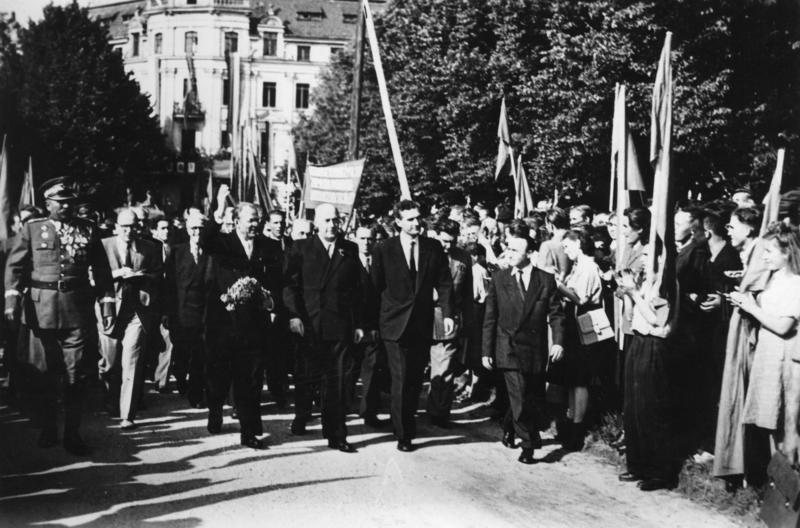
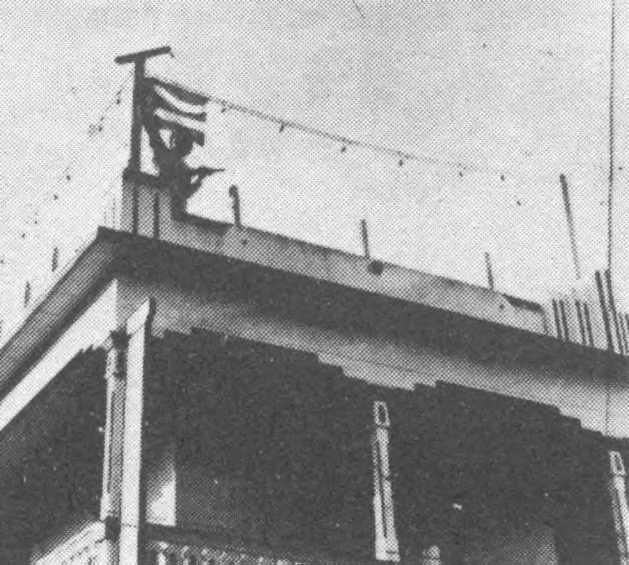
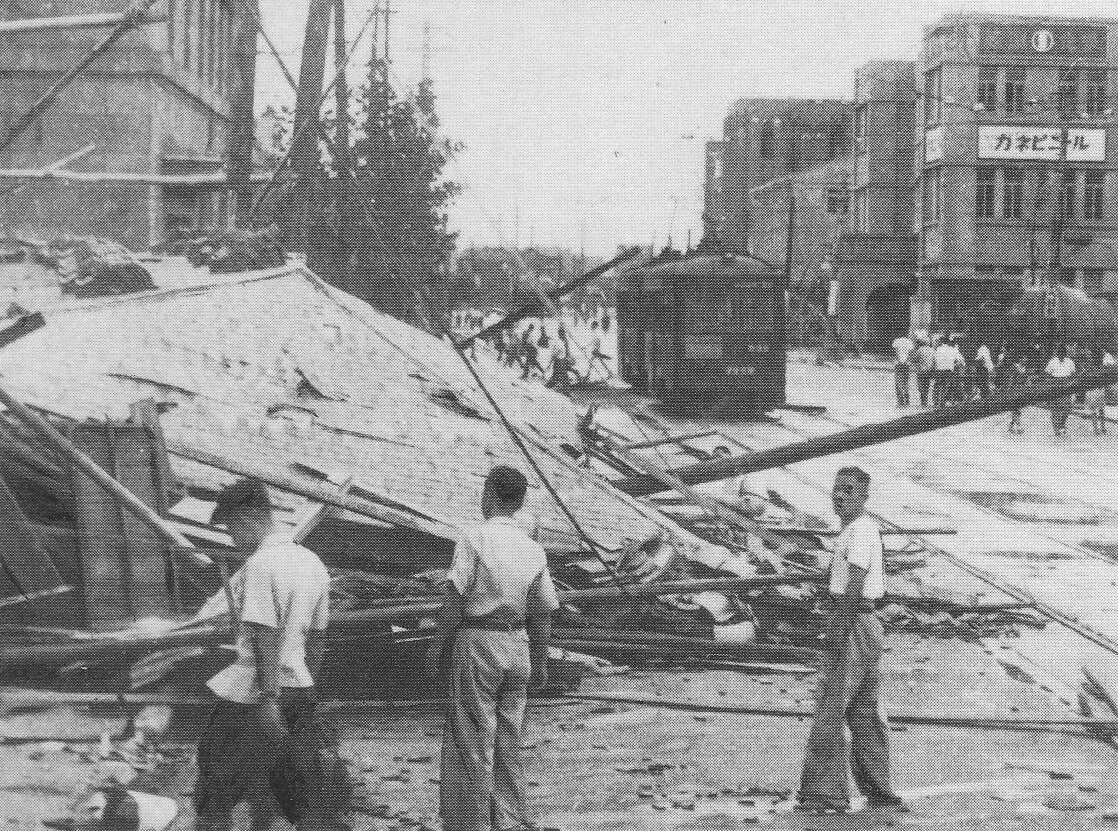
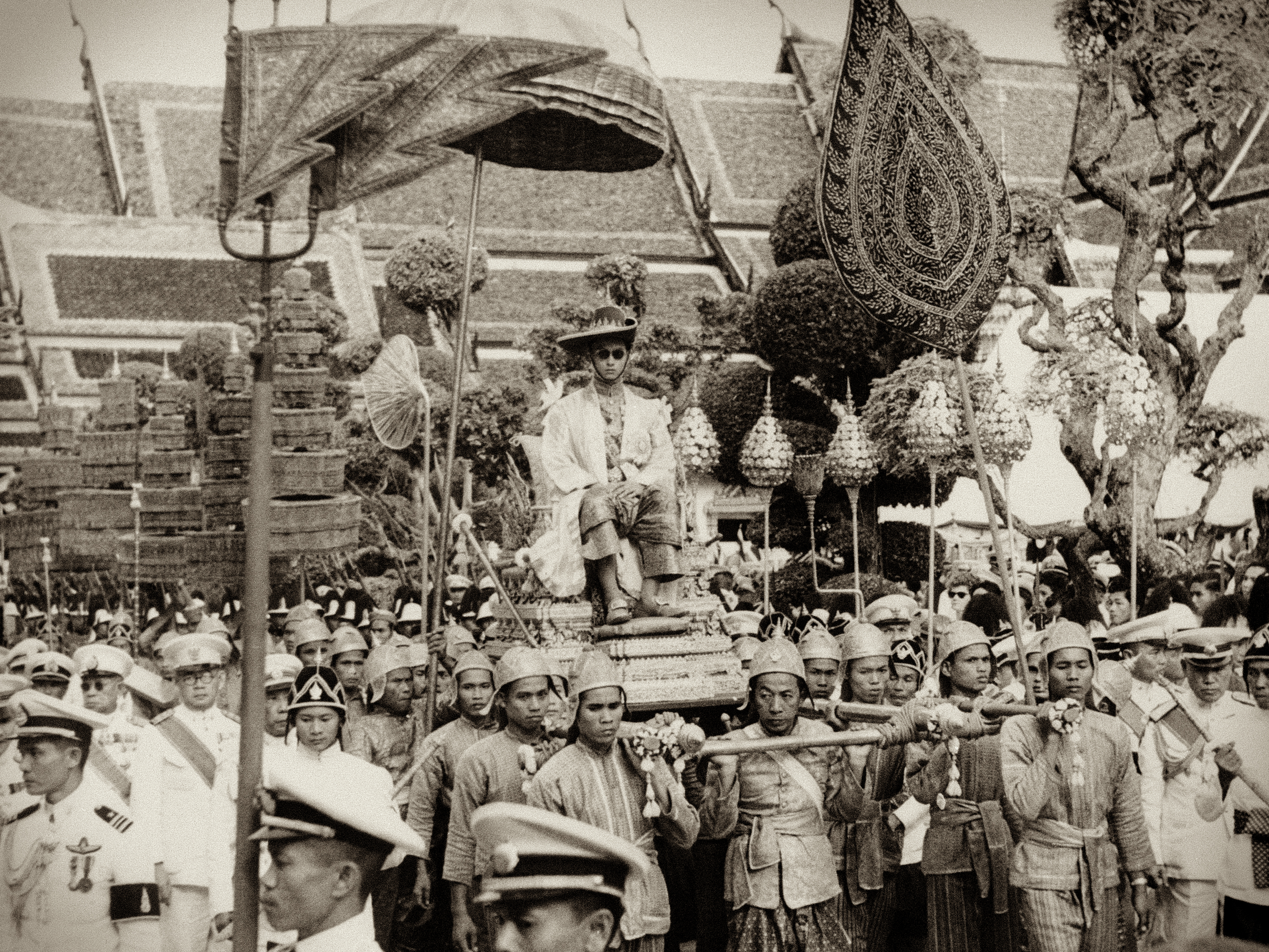
From top to bottom, left to right:
- The Korean War begins as North Korea invades the South in the Battle of Inchon;
- The Annexation of Tibet by China brings Tibet under Chinese control;
- The 1950 FIFA World Cup ends with Uruguay’s Maracanazo upset over Brazil;
- McCarthyism drives anti-communist hysteria in the U.S.;
- The 1950 Assam–Tibet earthquake causes massive destruction;
- The Treaty of Zgorzelec confirms the Oder–Neisse border;
- The Jayuya Uprising challenges U.S. rule in Puerto Rico;
- Typhoon Jane devastates Japan;
- King Bhumibol Adulyadej is crowned.

1950 (MCML) was a common year starting on Sunday of the Gregorian calendar, the 1950th year of the Common Era (CE) and Anno Domini (AD) designations, the 950th year of the 2nd millennium, the 50th year of the 20th century, and the 1st year of the 1950s decade.

== Events ==
=== January ===
- January 1 – The International Police Association (IPA) – the largest police organization in the world – is formed.
- January 5 – Sverdlovsk plane crash: Aeroflot Lisunov Li-2 crashes in a snowstorm. All 19 aboard are killed, including almost the entire national ice hockey team (VVS Moscow) of the Soviet Air Force – 11 players, as well as a team doctor and a masseur.
- January 6 – The United Kingdom recognizes the People's Republic of China; the Republic of China severs diplomatic relations with Britain in response.
- January 7 – A fire in the St Elizabeth's Ward of Mercy Hospital in Davenport, Iowa, United States, kills 41 patients.
- January 9 – The Israeli government recognizes the People's Republic of China.
- January 12 – British submarine HMS Truculent collides with Swedish oil tanker Divina in the Thames Estuary and sinks; 64 die.
- January 13 – Finland forms diplomatic relations with the People's Republic of China.

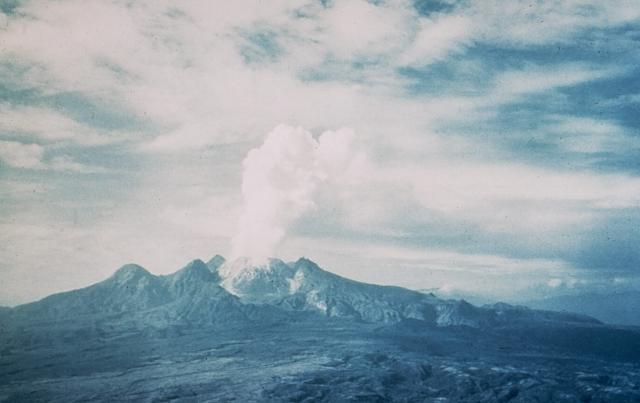
January 14 – Mount Lamington erupts in Papua New Guinea.

- January 21 – In the United States, suspected spy Alger Hiss is convicted on two counts of perjury.
- January 23 – The Knesset passes a resolution that states Jerusalem is the capital of Israel.
- January 24 – Cold War: Klaus Fuchs, German émigré physicist, confesses to a British MI5 interrogator that he is a Soviet spy: for seven years, he passed top secret data on U.S. and British nuclear weapons research to the Soviet Union. Fuchs is formally charged on February 2.
- January 26 – India promulgates its constitution, forming a republic, and Rajendra Prasad is sworn in as its first president. The Kingdom of Mysore is merged into the new republic.
- January 31
  - United States President Harry S. Truman orders the development of the hydrogen bomb, in response to the detonation of the Soviet Union's first atomic bomb in 1949.
  - The last Kuomintang troops surrender in mainland China.

=== February ===
- February 1 – Chiang Kai-shek is re-elected as president of the Republic of China.
- February 6
  - In West Virginia, 372,000 coal miners strike (they remain out until March 3).
  - In India, the first Cabinet Secretary (N. R. Pillai) is appointed.
- February 8
  - The Stasi is founded in East Germany, and acts as a secret police until 1990.
  - A payment is first made by Diners Club card, in New York, United States (the first use of a charge card).
- February 9 – In Wheeling, West Virginia, Senator Joseph McCarthy of Wisconsin makes a speech that claims to have 205 communists in the U.S. State Department.
- February 11
  - Two Viet Minh battalions attack a French base in French Indochina.
  - Finland recognizes Indonesia.
- February 12
  - The European Broadcasting Union is founded.
  - Albert Einstein warns that nuclear war could lead to mutual destruction.
- February 13 – British Columbia B-36 crash: The U.S. Air Force loses a Convair B-36 bomber that carried a Mark 4 nuclear bomb off the west coast of Canada, and produces the world's first Broken Arrow.
- February 14 – Cold War:
  - The Soviet Union and the People's Republic of China sign a mutual defense treaty (terminated in 1979).
  - In an election speech at Edinburgh, Winston Churchill proposes "a parley at the summit" with Soviet leaders, the first use of the term "summit" for such a meeting.
- February 15 – Juho Kusti Paasikivi is re-elected president of Finland.
- February 19 – Konrad Adenauer tries unsuccessfully to negotiate with East Germany, to begin reunification.
- February 21 – Cunard liner Aquitania arrives at the scrapyard in Faslane at the end of a 36-year career, the longest of any in the 20th Century.
- February 23 – 1950 United Kingdom general election: The Labour Party, led by Clement Attlee, remains in office, but the Tories, led by Winston Churchill, increase their seats in the House of Commons.
- February – The Ad Hoc Committee on Slavery of the United Nations is formally inaugurated with its first meeting at Lake Success in February 1950.

=== March ===
- March 1
  - Klaus Fuchs is convicted in London of spying against both Britain and the United States for the Soviet Union, by giving to the latter top secret atomic bomb data.
  - Acting President of the Republic of China Li Zongren ends his term in office and Chiang Kai-shek resumes his duties as president, after moving the government of the Republic to Taipei, Taiwan.
- March 3 – Poland indicates its intention to exile all Germans.
- March 8 – The first Volkswagen Type 2 (also known as the Microbus) rolls off the assembly line in Wolfsburg, Germany.
- March 12
  - A plane carrying returning rugby fans from Ireland to Wales crashes near Llandow, with the loss of 80 lives.
  - Royal question: 1950 Belgian monarchy referendum – In Belgium, a referendum on the monarchy shows 57.7% support the return of King Leopold III from exile to resume exercise of his constitutional powers, 42.3% against. The King has said he would abdicate if he did not receive 55% support, and that the final decision would be for the federal parliament.
- March 18 – The Belgian government collapses, after the March 12 referendum.
- March 20 – The Polish government enacts a law to take possession of properties owned by Roman Catholic churches.
- March 22 – Egypt demands that Britain remove all its troops from the Suez Canal zone.
- March 23 – The 22nd Academy Awards ceremony is held in Hollywood. All the King's Men (1949 film) is Best Picture.

=== April ===
- April 14 – Influential British adventure comic Eagle is launched.
- April 21 – Nainital wedding massacre: A mass stabbing occurs at Nainital in India, killing 22 members of the Harijan caste.
- April 24 – Jordan formally annexes the West Bank.
- April 27
  - Apartheid: In South Africa, the Group Areas Act is passed, formally segregating the races.
  - Britain formally recognises Israel.

=== May ===
- May 1 – UNRWA, the United Nations Relief and Works Agency for Palestine Refugees in the Near East, begins operations.
- May 5 – Bhumibol Adulyadej (Rama IX), king of Thailand since 1946, is crowned, at The Grand Palace in Bangkok.
- May 6 – Cazin rebellion in Bosnia against Communist agrarian reforms.
- May 8 – Tollund Man is unearthed in Denmark.
- May 9 – Robert Schuman presents his proposal for the creation of a pan-European organisation, which he believes to be indispensable to the maintenance of permanently peaceful relations between the different nations of the continent. This proposal, known as the "Schuman Declaration", is considered to be the beginning of the creation of what becomes the European Union.
- May 11 – The Kefauver Committee hearings into U.S. organized crime begin.
- May 13 – The first race in the inaugural FIA Formula One World Championship in automobile racing is held, at Silverstone, England.
- May 14 – The Huntsville Times runs the headline "Dr. von Braun Says Rocket Flights Possible to Moon."
- May 17 – Israeli Air Force Spitfires intercept a British Royal Air Force Short Sunderland when it inadvertently crosses into Israeli airspace, forcing it to land at Lod Airport. The Sunderland's crew have been issued maps that do not depict Israel, as Britain had not recognized the Jewish state at the time they were issued.
- May 22
  - Celâl Bayar becomes the third president of Turkey and Adnan Menderes of the DP forms the new government of Turkey (19th government).
  - Recorded premiere of Four Last Songs (1948) by German composer Richard Strauss (d. 1949) given by the composer's choice of soloist, Norwegian-born soprano Kirsten Flagstad, with the Philharmonia Orchestra conducted by Wilhelm Furtwängler at the Royal Albert Hall in London, sponsored by Jayachamarajendra Wadiyar, Sultan of Mysore.
- May 24 – The United States Maritime Administration is formed (under the Department of Commerce).
- May 25 – The Brooklyn–Battery Tunnel is formally opened to traffic in New York City.
- May 29
  - St. Roch, the first ship to circumnavigate North America, arrives in Halifax, Nova Scotia.
  - The pilot series of the world's longest-running radio soap opera, The Archers, is first broadcast on the BBC Light Programme in the U.K. It will still be running more than 75 years later.

=== June ===
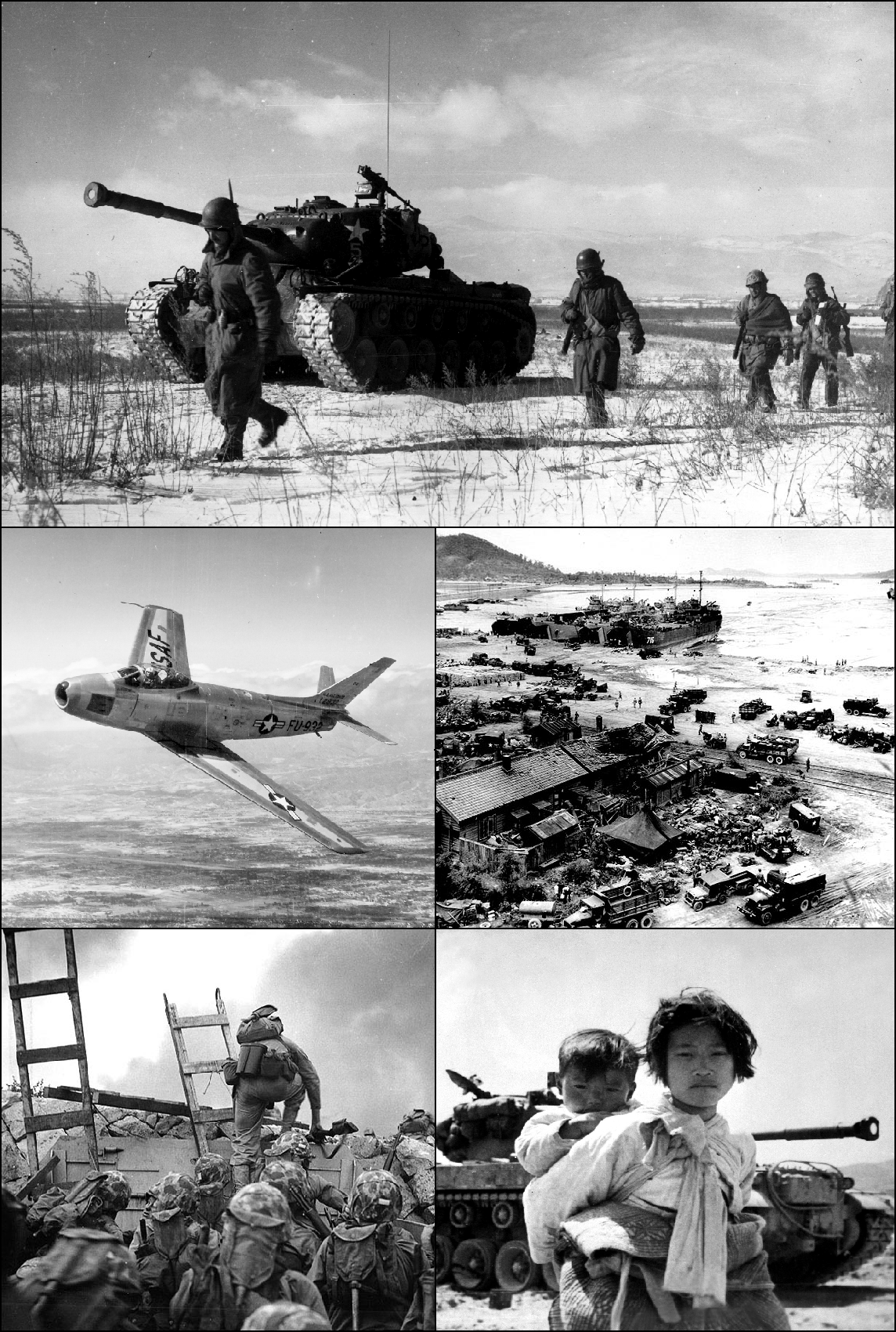
June 25 – Korean War begins.

- June 1–23 – Mauna Loa in Hawaii starts erupting.
- June 3 – Maurice Herzog and Louis Lachenal, of the French Annapurna expedition, become the first climbers to reach the summit of an 8,000-metre peak.
- June 6 – In Turkey, the Adhan (call to prayer) in Arabic is permitted by law after a ban of 18 years.
- June 8 – Sir Thomas Blamey becomes the only Field Marshal in Australian history.
- June 16 – Maracanã Stadium, which becomes a well-known sports venue of Brazil, opens in Rio de Janeiro, in advance of the opening of the 1950 FIFA World Cup in the country on June 24.
- June 25 – The Korean War begins: Troops and T-34 tanks of the North Korean People's Army cross the 38th parallel into South Korea.
- June 27 – Korean War: U.S. President Harry S. Truman orders American military forces to aid in the defense of South Korea.
- June 28 – Korean War:
  - North Korean forces capture Seoul, but do not win the war.
  - Hangang Bridge bombing: The South Korean army, in an attempt to defend Seoul, blows up the Hangang Bridge while it is crowded with refugees.
  - Seoul National University Hospital massacre: North Korean troops kill around 800 medical staff and patients.
  - Bodo League massacre begins: South Korean armed forces and police summarily execute at least 100,000 suspected North Korean sympathizers.

=== July ===
- July 14–21 – Korean War: Battle of Taejon – North Korean forces capture the city held by the U.S. 24th Infantry Division, but the delay allows establishment of the Pusan Perimeter.
- July 16 – Uruguay beats Brazil 2–1, to win the 1950 World Cup, the match dubbed the Maracanazo.
- July 17 – The Suppression of Communism Act (passed on June 26 by the Parliament of South Africa) comes into force in South Africa.
- July 20 – Air Battle of South Korea: After a month-long campaign, the majority of North Korea's People's Air Force is destroyed by anti-communist forces.
- July 22 – Royal question in Belgium: King Leopold III returns from exile, provoking a general strike, particularly in Wallonia.
- July 30 – 4 workers striking over the "Royal question" in Belgium are shot dead by the Gendarmerie, at Grâce-Berleur near Liège.

=== August ===
- August 1 – Royal question: King Leopold III of Belgium publicly announces that he will abdicate in favor of his son, Baudouin.
- August 5
  - 2 Squadron SAAF departs from South Africa to take part in the Korean War.
  - 1950 Fairfield-Suisun Boeing B-29 crash: A bomb-laden Boeing B-29 Superfortress crashes into a residential area in California, United States, killing 17 people and injuring 68.
- August 6 – Monarchist demonstrations lead to a riot in Brussels.
- August 8
  - American Florence Chadwick swims the English Channel in 13 hours, 22 minutes, beating the women's record for the crossing.
  - Winston Churchill supports the idea of a pan-European army, allied with Canada and the U.S.
- August 12
  - Korean War: Bloody Gulch massacre – 75 U.S. soldiers are executed after being captured in battle by North Korea.
  - In his encyclical Humani generis, Pope Pius XII requires Catholic theologians to defer to the teachings of the Church as a whole but declares evolution to be a serious hypothesis that does not contradict essential Catholic views.
- August 15 – The 8.6 M_{w} Assam–Tibet earthquake shakes the region, with a maximum Mercalli intensity of XI (Extreme), killing about 4,800 people.
- August 17 – Korean War: Hill 303 massacre – 39 U.S. soldiers are executed after being captured in battle by North Korea.
- August 22
  - France announces the introduction of a government-guaranteed minimum wage.
  - The Immaculate Heart of Mary Seminary is founded in Tagbilaran City, Philippines.
- August 23 – Legendary African American singer-actor Paul Robeson, whose passport has recently been revoked because of his alleged Communist affiliations, meets with U.S. officials in an effort to get it reinstated. He is unsuccessful, and it is not reinstated until 1958.

=== September ===
- September 3 – Italian racing driver Giuseppe Farina becomes the first winner of the FIA Formula One World Championship, being the only driver to win the championship in his home country.
- September 7 – The Knockshinnoch Disaster in Scotland kills 13 coal miners; 116 are rescued.
- September 15 – Korean War: Battle of Inchon – Allied troops commanded by Douglas MacArthur land in Inchon, occupied by North Korea, to begin a U.N. counteroffensive.
- September 18 – Rede Tupi, the first television broadcast network in South America, is founded in Brazil.
- September 19
  - West Germany decides to purge communist officials.
  - Korean War: An attack by North Korean forces is repelled at the Battle of Nam River.
- September 26 – Indonesia is admitted to the United Nations.

=== October ===
- October – Turing test published.
- October 2 – The comic strip Peanuts by Charles M. Schulz is first published in seven U.S. newspapers.
- October 3 – Getúlio Vargas is elected president of Brazil for a 5-year term.
- October 5 – The Indonesian government quells riots in the Moluccas.
- October 7
  - Battle of Chamdo: The Annexation of Tibet by the People's Republic of China, begins with the Chinese People's Liberation Army invading across the Jinsha River. By October 19 they will have taken the border town of Chamdo, and the Tibetan army will have surrendered.
  - The Agate Pass Bridge opens for traffic in Washington State.
- October 9 – The Goyang Geumjeong Cave massacre begins in South Korea.
- October 11 – The Federal Communications Commission in the United States issues the first license to broadcast television in color, to CBS (RCA will successfully dispute and block the license from taking effect, however).
- October 19 – Korean War: The People's Republic of China enters the conflict, by sending thousands of soldiers across the Yalu River.
- October 20 – Australia passes the Communist Party Dissolution Act, which is later struck down by the High Court.
- October 28 – Torcida Split is founded, in support of the Association football club HNK Hajduk Split, in SFR Yugoslavia.
- October 29 – Upon the death of Gustaf V of Sweden, he is succeeded as king by his 68-year-old son Gustaf VI Adolf.
- October 30 – The Jayuya Uprising is started by Puerto Rican Nationalists against the United States-supported government.

=== November ===
- November 1
  - Pope Pius XII witnesses the "Miracle of the Sun" at the Vatican and defines a new dogma of Roman Catholicism, the Munificentissimus Deus, which says that God took Mary's body into Heaven after her death (the "Assumption of the Blessed Virgin Mary").
  - Puerto Rican nationalists Griselio Torresola and Oscar Collazo attempt to assassinate U.S. President Harry S. Truman, who is staying at the Blair-Lee House in Washington, D.C. during White House repairs.
- November 4 – The United Nations ends the diplomatic isolation of Spain.
- November 8 – Korean War: While in an F-80, United States Air Force Lt. Russell J. Brown intercepts 2 North Korean MiG-15s near the Yalu River and shoots them down, in the first jet-to-jet dogfight in history.
- November 10 – A U.S. Air Force B-50 Superfortress bomber, experiencing an in-flight emergency, jettisons and detonates a Mark 4 nuclear bomb over Quebec, Canada (the device lacks its plutonium core).
- November 13
  - The President of Venezuela, Colonel Carlos Delgado Chalbaud, is kidnapped and murdered in Caracas.
  - A Curtiss Reid Flying Services plane crashes while en route to Paris from Rome, killing all 52 on board.
- November 17 – Tenzin Gyatso, 15, is formally enthroned as the 14th Dalai Lama, becoming temporal ruler of Tibet.
- November 18 – The United Nations accepts the formation of the Libyan National Council.
- November 24 – A phenomenal winter storm ravages the northeastern United States, brings 30–50 inches of snow and temperatures below zero, and kills 323 people.
- November 26 – Korean War: Troops from the People's Republic of China launch a massive counterattack against South Korean and United Nations forces at the Battle of the Ch'ongch'on River and the Battle of Chosin Reservoir, dashing any hopes for a quick end to the conflict.
- November 28
  - The Colombo Plan for Co-operative Economic Development in South and South-East Asia comes into effect.
  - Greece and Yugoslavia reform diplomatic relations.
- November 29 – The National Council of the Churches of Christ in the USA is founded.
- November 30 – Douglas MacArthur threatens to use nuclear weapons in Korea.

=== December ===
- December 2 – Korean War: The Battle of the Ch'ongch'on River ends with the Chinese People's Volunteer Army expelling United Nations forces from North Korea.
- December 31 – The inaugural 12 Hours of Sebring automobile endurance race is held in Florida.

=== Date unknown ===
- Raid Pyrénéen, a French timed bicycle challenge, is first staged.
- Summer – The first newspaper for the Romanian minority in modern Hungary, Foaia Românească ("The Romanian Sheet"), is founded.

== Births ==
=== January ===
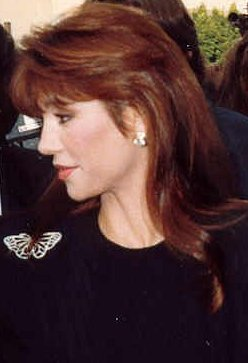
Victoria Principal

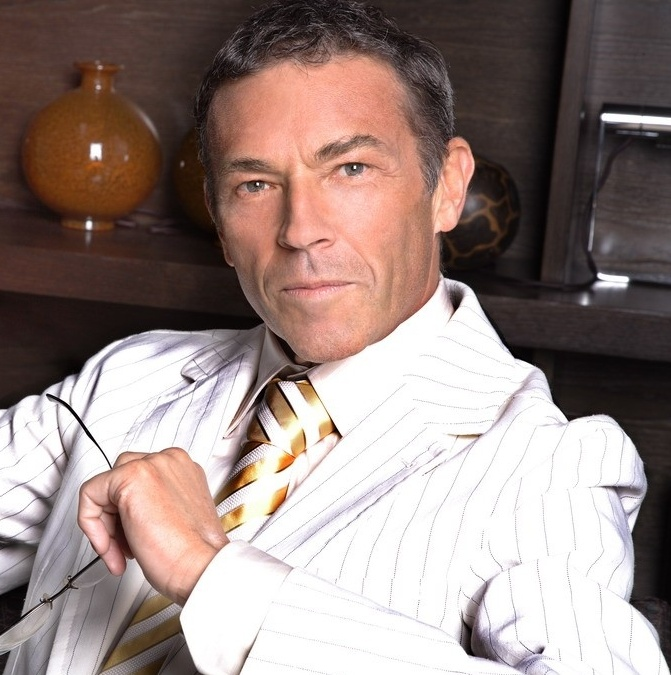
Jörg Haider

- January 1 – Wayne Bennett, Australian rugby league player and coach
- January 3
  - Victoria Principal, American actress (Dallas)
  - Vesna Vulović, Serbian flight attendant and world-record holding plane crash survivor (d. 2016)
- January 7
  - Juan Gabriel, Mexican singer, songwriter and philanthropist (d. 2016)
  - Erin Gray, American actress
- January 9 – Alec Jeffreys, British geneticist, who developed techniques for DNA fingerprinting and DNA profiling
- January 12 – Dorrit Moussaieff, Israeli-born British businesswoman; First Lady of Iceland 2003-2016
- January 14 – Jagadguru Rāmabhadrācārya, Hindu religious leader
- January 16
  - Debbie Allen, African-American actress, dancer, and choreographer
  - Honey Irani, Indian film actress and screenwriter
  - Luis López Nieves, Puerto Rican writer
- January 18 – Gilles Villeneuve, Canadian race car driver (d. 1982)
- January 21 – Billy Ocean, Trinidadian–British singer
- January 23 – Richard Dean Anderson, American actor (MacGyver)
- January 24
  - Daniel Auteuil, French actor
  - Gennifer Flowers, American actress, connected to Bill Clinton
- January 26 – Jörg Haider, Austrian politician (d. 2008)
- January 29
  - Ann Jillian, American actress
  - Jody Scheckter, South African racing driver
  - Miklós Vámos, Hungarian writer, screenwriter
- January 31 - Ismael Mario Zambada "El Mayo" García, Mexican drug lord

=== February ===
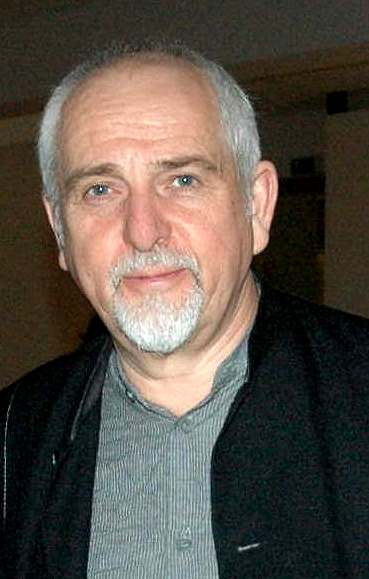
Peter Gabriel

- February 1 – Kazimierz Nycz, Polish clergyman
- February 3 – Morgan Fairchild, American actress (Flamingo Road)
- February 5 – Jonathan Freeman, American actor and puppeteer.
- February 6 – Natalie Cole, African-American singer (d. 2015)
- February 7 – Karen Joy Fowler, American author
- February 10
  - Luis Donaldo Colosio, Mexican politician and economist, assassinated while campaigning for President of Mexico (d. 1994)
  - Mark Spitz, American Olympic swimmer
- February 12
  - Michael Ironside, Canadian actor (V)
  - João W. Nery, Brazilian writer and LGBT activist (d. 2018)
- February 13
  - Peter Gabriel, British rock musician, original lead singer of Genesis
  - Bob Daisley, Australian musician
  - Lyman Hoffman, American politician and member of the Alaska State Legislature since 1987
- February 15 – Tsui Hark, Hong Kong film director
- February 16 – Peter Hain, Kenyan-born British politician
- February 18
  - Nana Amba Eyiaba I, Ghanaian queen mother and advocate
  - John Hughes, American film director, producer and writer (d. 2009)
  - Cybill Shepherd, American actress (The Last Picture Show)
- February 21
  - Larry Drake, American actor, voice artist, and comedian (d. 2016)
  - Sahle-Work Zewde, President of Ethiopia
- February 22
  - Julius Erving, African-American basketball player
  - Fabio Innocenti, retired Italian volleyball player
  - Awn Al-Khasawneh, Prime Minister of Jordan
  - Miou-Miou, French actress
  - Julie Walters, English actress
- February 24 – George Thorogood, American musician
- February 25
  - Neil Jordan, Irish film director, writer and producer
  - Néstor Kirchner, 49th President of Argentina (d. 2010)
- February 26
  - Jonathan Cain, American musician
  - Helen Clark, Prime Minister of New Zealand
- February 27 – Azean Irdawaty, Malaysian actress, singer (d. 2013)
- February 28 – Jaime Fabregas, Filipino actor

=== March ===
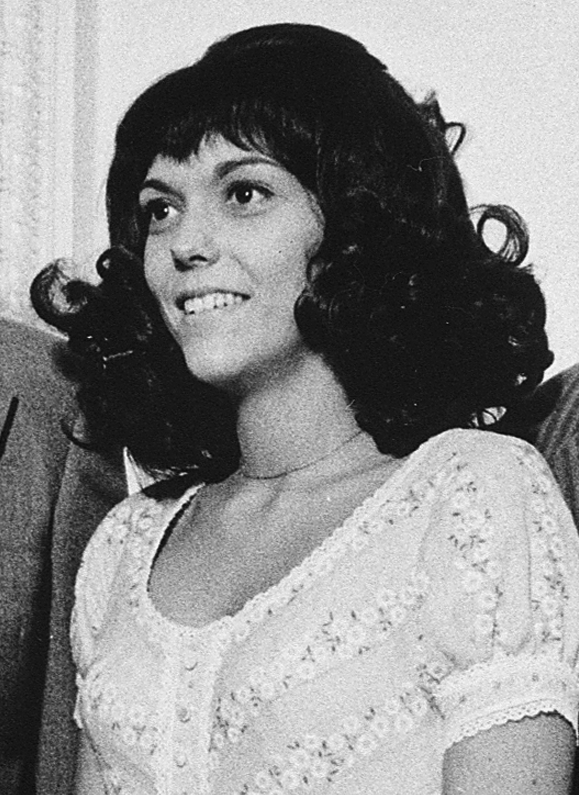
Karen Carpenter

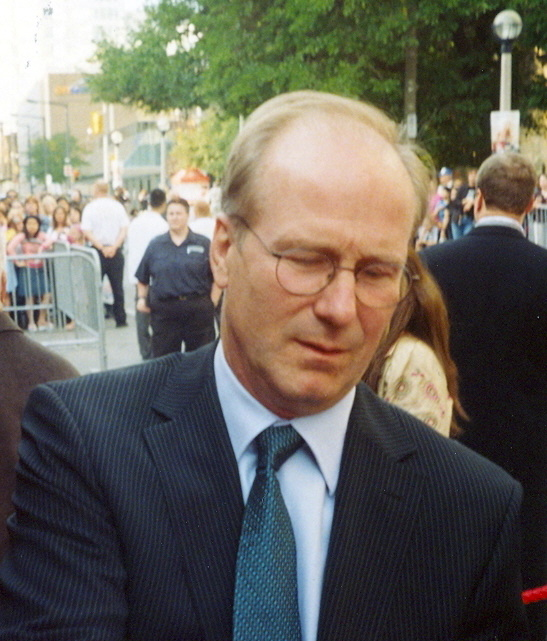
William Hurt

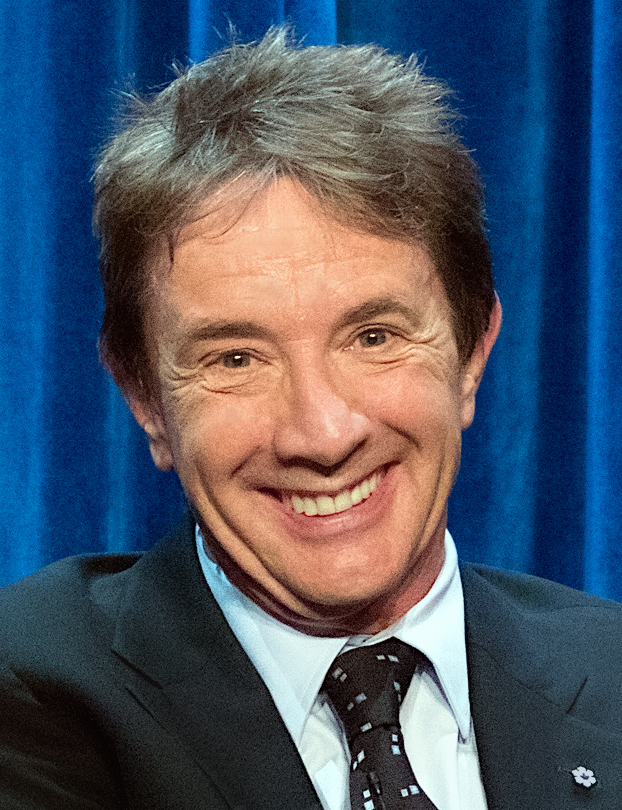
Martin Short

- March 1 – Phil Alden Robinson, American film director
- March 2 – Karen Carpenter, American singer and drummer (d. 1983)
- March 4 – Rick Perry, American politician, 14th U.S. Secretary of Energy, 47th Governor of Texas
- March 9 – Danny Sullivan, American race car driver
- March 10
  - Carlos Roberto Flores, President of Honduras
  - Catherine Pugh, Democrat politician, 50th mayor of Baltimore and criminal
- March 11
  - Bobby McFerrin, African-American singer (Don't Worry, Be Happy)
  - Jerry Zucker, American film producer, director and writer
- March 12 – Javier Clemente, Spanish football player, manager
- March 13
  - Robert Brandom, American philosopher
  - William H. Macy, American actor
  - Charles Krauthammer, American conservative political commentator (d. 2018)
- March 18 – Brad Dourif, American actor
- March 20 – William Hurt, American actor (d. 2022)
- March 21 – Sergey Lavrov, current Foreign Minister of Russia
- March 22
  - Hugo Egon Balder, German actor, television presenter
  - Jocky Wilson, Scottish darts player (d. 2012)
- March 26
  - Teddy Pendergrass, African-American singer (d. 2010)
  - Martin Short, Canadian-born comedian (Saturday Night Live)
  - Alan Silvestri, American composer, conductor
- March 27 – Maria Ewing, American operatic soprano (d. 2022)
- March 29
  - Kulsoom Nawaz, Pakistani politician (d. 2018)
  - Mory Kanté, Guinean musician (d. 2020)
- March 30 – Robbie Coltrane, Scottish actor and comedian (d. 2022)

=== April ===
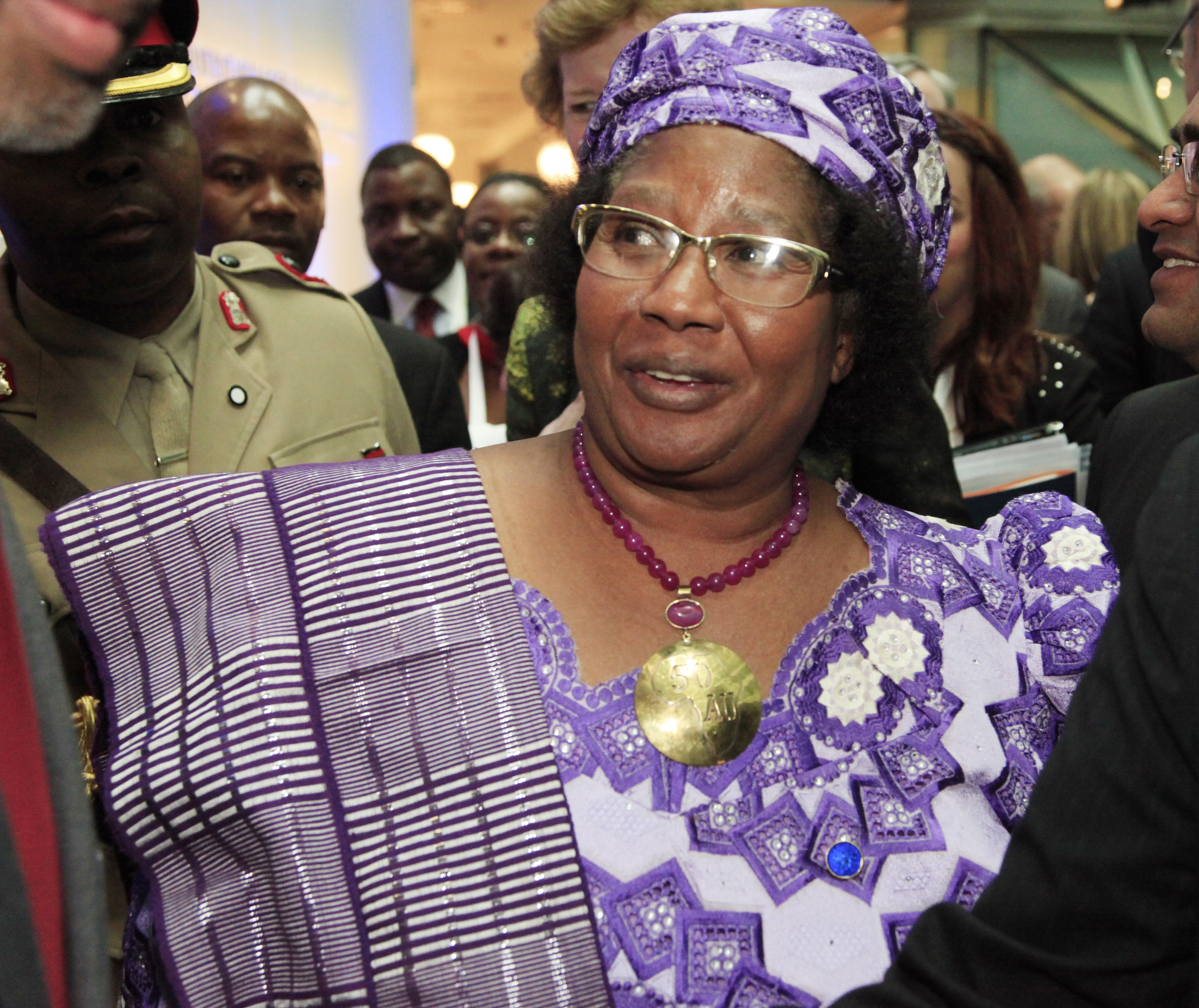
Joyce Banda

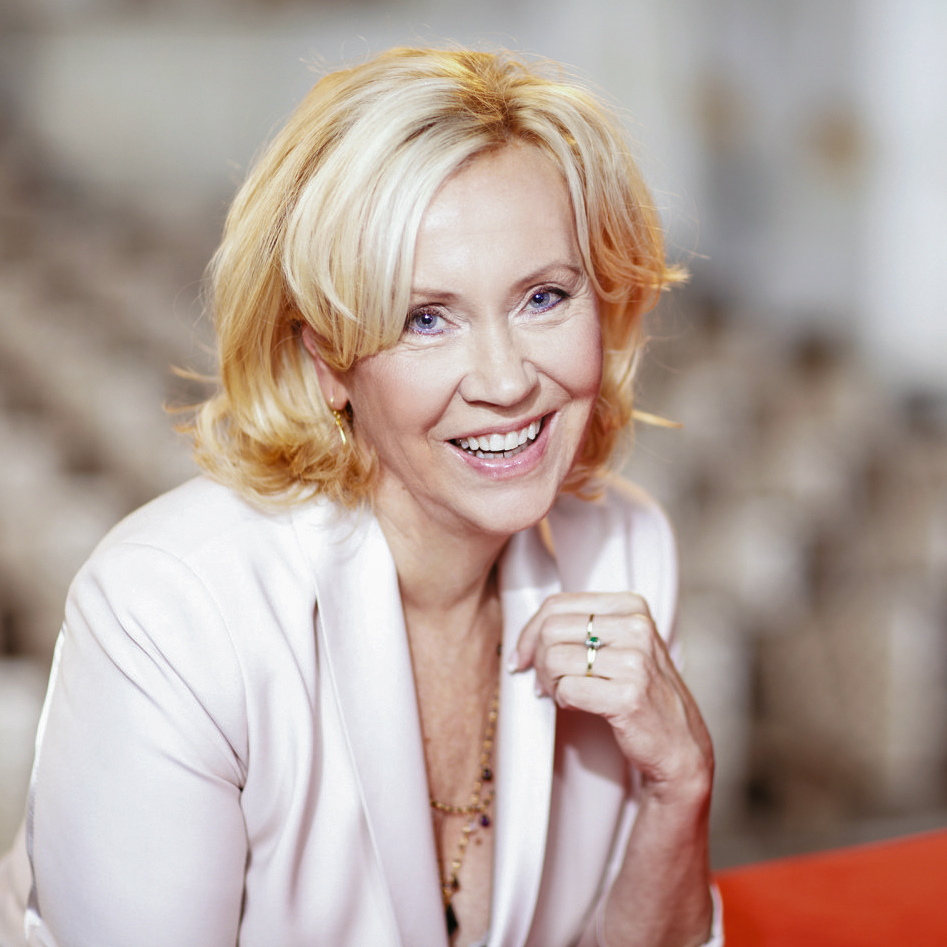
Agnetha Fältskog

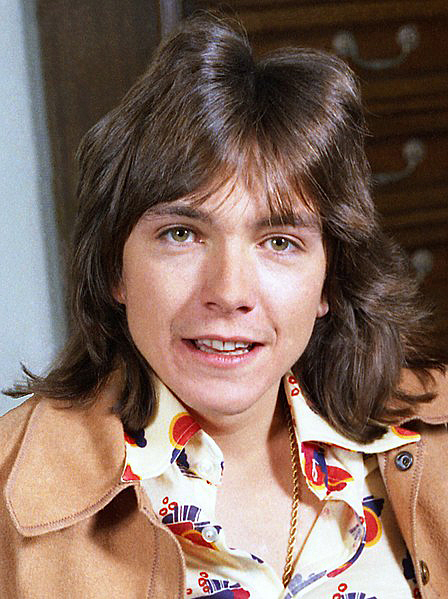
David Cassidy

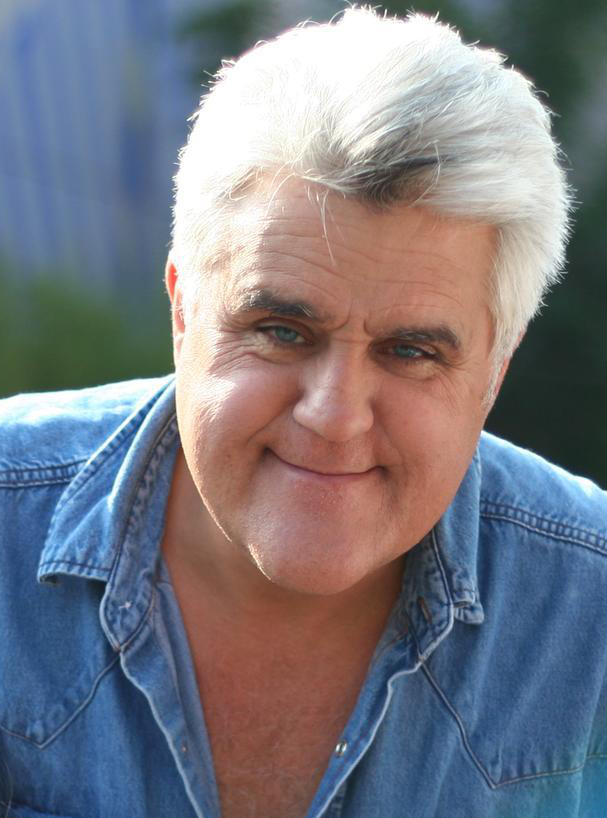
Jay Leno

- April 1 – Samuel Alito, Associate Justice of the Supreme Court of the United States
- April 4 – Christine Lahti, American actress
- April 5
  - Agnetha Fältskog, Swedish pop singer, songwriter (ABBA)
  - Harpo, Swedish pop musician
  - Paul Oscher, American blues singer-songwriter
- April 6 – Tan Aik Mong, Malaysian badminton player (d. 2020)
- April 8 – Grzegorz Lato, Polish footballer
- April 11 – Bill Irwin, American actor
- April 12
  - Joyce Banda, née Mtila, 4th President of Malawi
  - David Cassidy, American actor and singer (d. 2017)
- April 13
  - Ron Perlman, American television, film, stage, and voice actor
  - Tommy Raudonikis, Australian rugby league player and coach (d. 2021)
  - Joseph Paul Franklin, American serial killer and terrorist (d. 2013)
- April 14
  - Francis Collins, American physician
  - Péter Esterházy, Hungarian writer (d. 2016)
- April 15 − Josiane Balasko, French actress, writer and director
- April 18 − Kenny Ortega, American filmmaker, touring manager, and choreographer
- April 20 − N. Chandrababu Naidu, Indian politician, 13th Chief Minister of Andhra Pradesh
- April 22
  - Peter Frampton, English rock musician
  - Thierry Zéno, Belgian filmmaker
- April 26
  - Liz Chase, Zimbabwean field hockey player (d. 2018)
  - Susana Higuchi, Peruvian politician (d.2021)
- April 28 – Jay Leno, American comedian and talk show host
- April 29
  - Paul Holmes, New Zealand radio and television broadcaster (d. 2013)
  - Debbie Stabenow, former United States Senator from Michigan (2001-2025)

=== May ===
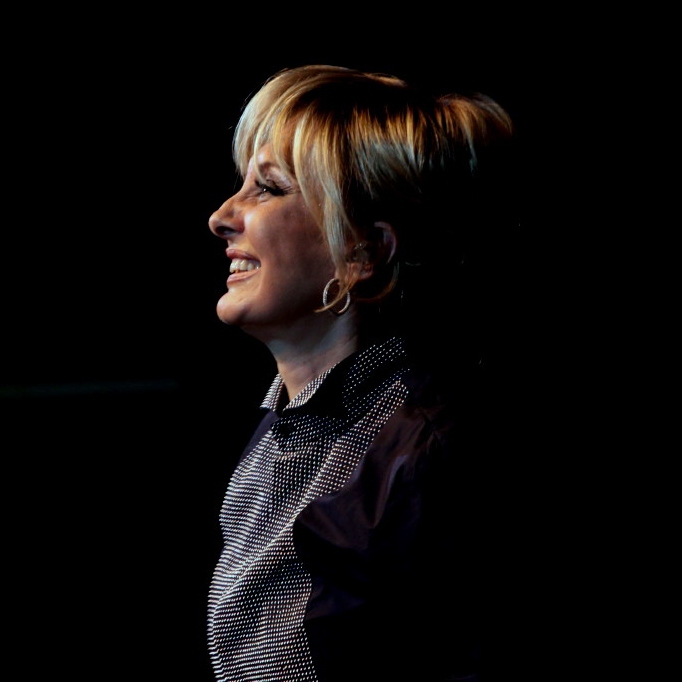
Googoosh

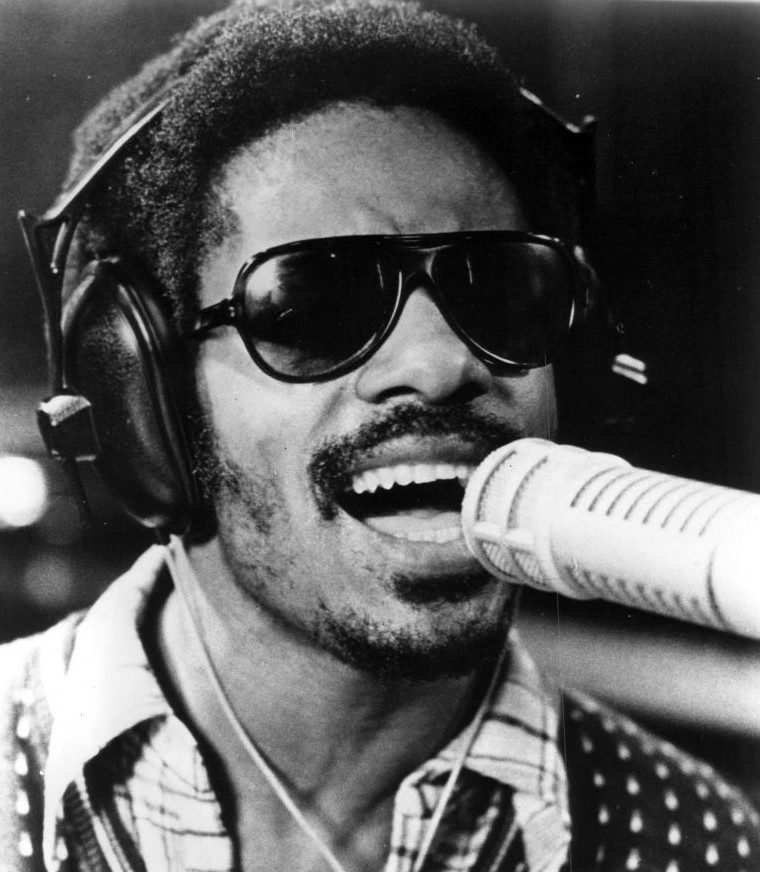
Stevie Wonder

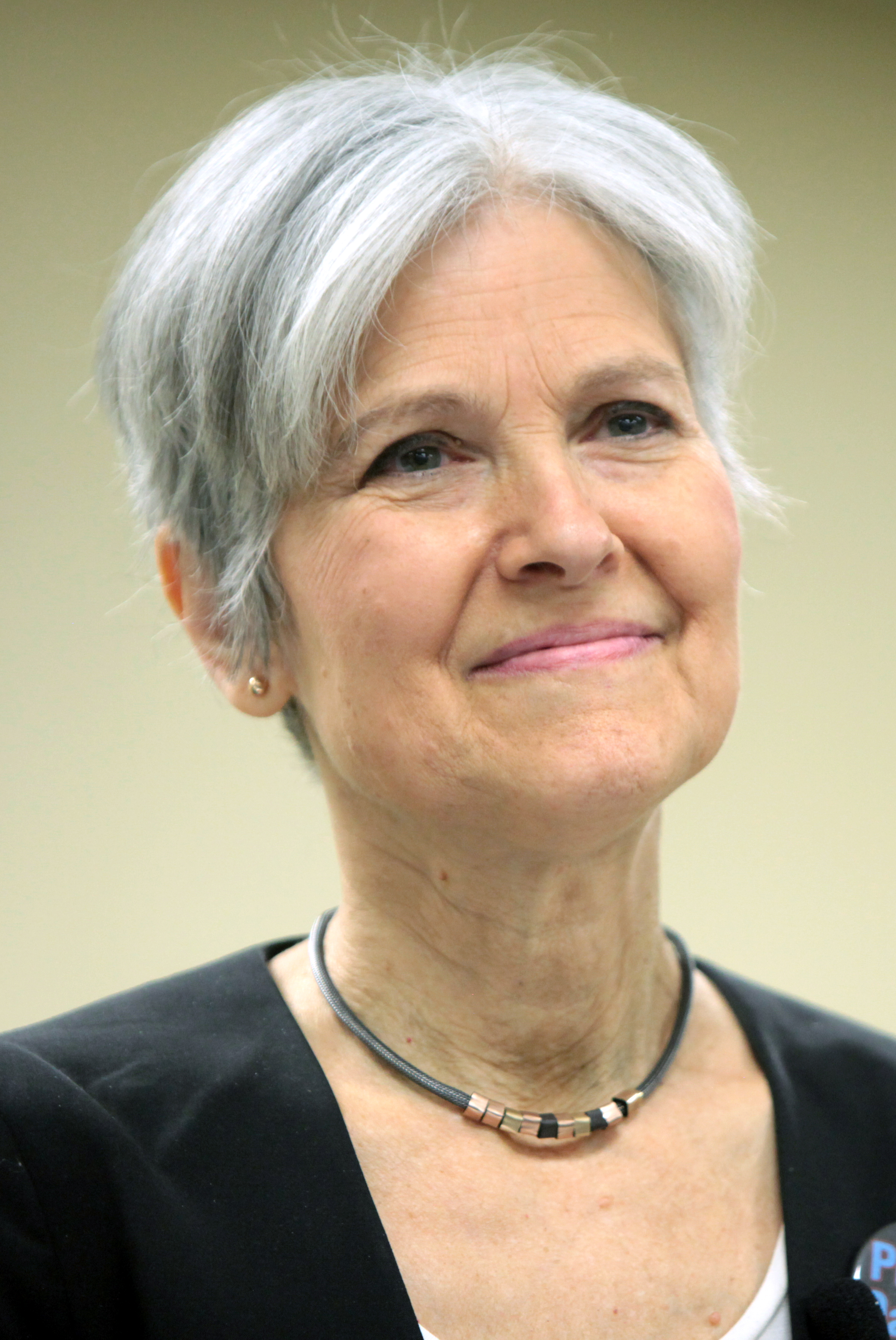
Jill Stein

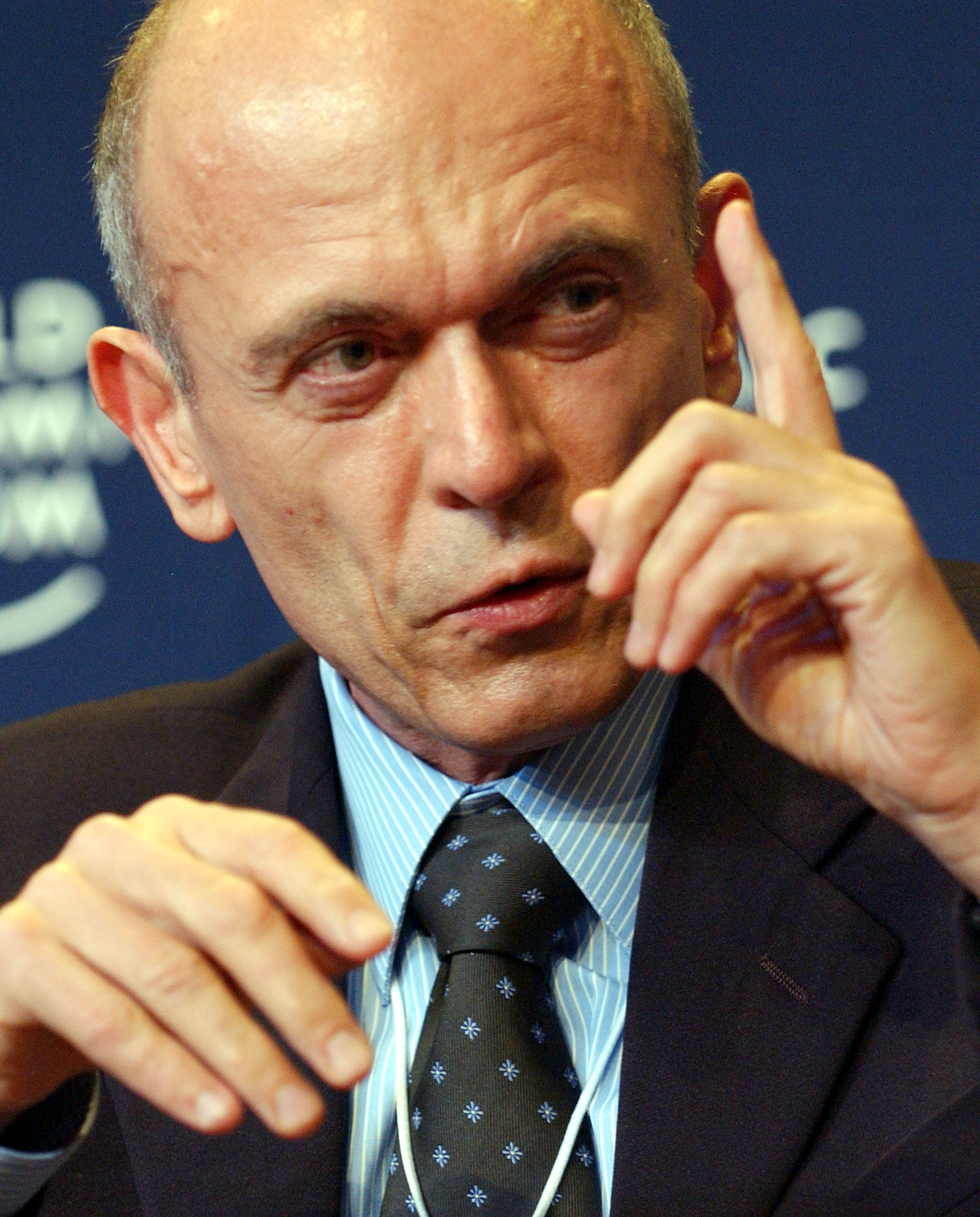
Janez Drnovšek

- May 2 – Lou Gramm, American singer-songwriter (Foreigner)
- May 3 – Kensō Soai, Japanese organic chemist, Nobel Prize laureate
- May 5 – Googoosh, Iranian singer and actress
- May 6 – Jeffery Deaver, American crime writer
- May 7 – Tim Russert, American journalist (Meet the Press) (d. 2008)
- May 10 – Dale Wilson, Canadian voice actor
- May 11 – Sadashiv Amrapurkar, Indian actor (d. 2014)
- May 12
  - Gabriel Byrne, Irish actor
  - Ana Cano, Spanish philologist
- May 13
  - Joe Johnston, American film director
  - Danny Kirwan, English rock musician (d. 2018)
  - Stevie Wonder, African-American musician
- May 14 – Jill Stein, American politician and activist, 2016 Green Party presidential candidate
- May 15 – Renate Stecher, East German sprinter
- May 16 – Georg Bednorz, German physicist, Nobel Prize laureate
- May 17 – Janez Drnovšek, Slovenian politician, 2-time Prime Minister of Slovenia, 2nd President of Slovenia (d. 2008)
- May 18
  - Thomas Gottschalk, German radio, television host, entertainer and actor
  - Mark Mothersbaugh, American composer, artist and singer (Devo)
- May 23 – Richard Chase, American "vampirist" serial killer (d. 1980)
- May 29 – Frederick Sumaye, 7th Prime Minister of Tanzania

=== June ===
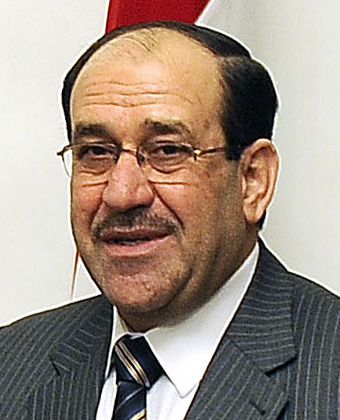
Nouri al-Maliki

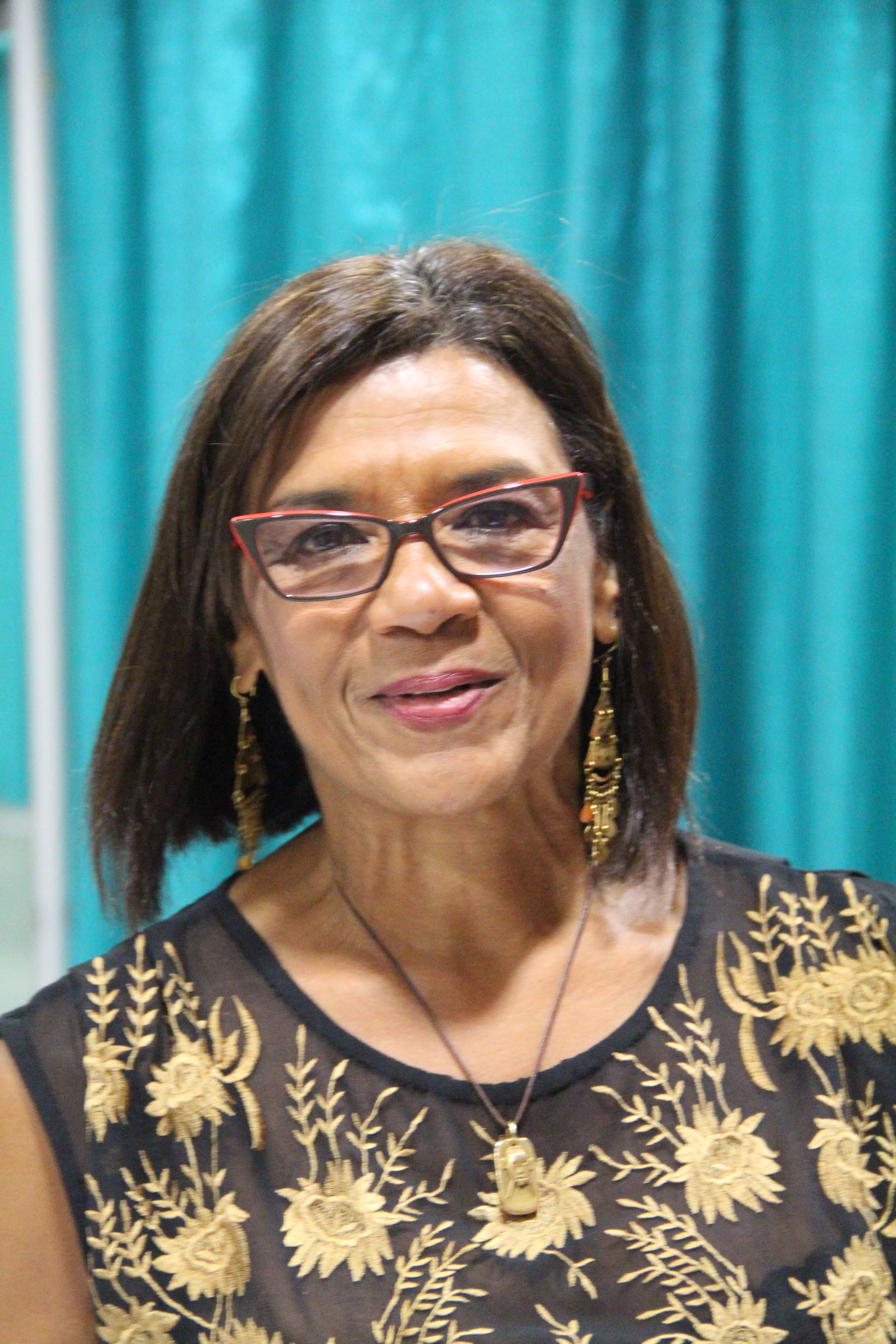
Sonia Manzano

- June 3
  - Melissa Mathison, American screenwriter (d. 2015)
  - Suzi Quatro, American singer-songwriter
  - Deniece Williams, African-American singer
- June 5 – Abraham Sarmiento Jr., Filipino journalist and political activist (d. 1977)
- June 8 – Kathy Baker, American actress
- June 13 – Belinda Bauer, Australian actress
- June 14 – Rowan Williams, Archbishop of Canterbury
- June 15 – Lakshmi Mittal, Indian industrialist
- June 16 – Mithun Chakraborty, Indian actor, singer, producer, writer, social worker and entrepreneur
- June 19
  - Ray Lovelock, Italian actor and musician
  - Ann Wilson, American singer, musician ((Heart))
- June 20 – Nouri al-Maliki, 74th Prime Minister of Iraq
- June 21
  - Anne Carson, Canadian poet, essayist, translator and classical scholar, Nobel Prize laureate
  - Joey Kramer, American rock drummer
  - Vasilis Papakonstantinou, Greek singer and musician
- June 22
  - Adrian Năstase, 59th Prime Minister of Romania
  - Zenonas Petrauskas, Lithuanian lawyer and politician (d. 2009)
- June 24 – Nancy Allen, American actress
- June 25
  - Nitza Saul, Israeli actress
  - Marcello Toninelli, Italian comics writer
- June 26 – Jaak Joala, Estonian singer, musician (d. 2010)
- June 29 – Simone Gbagbo, ICC criminal, previously Ivorian politician and First Lady

=== July ===
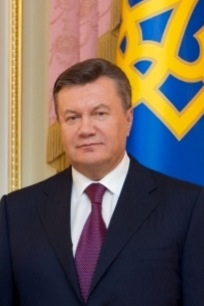
Viktor Yanukovych

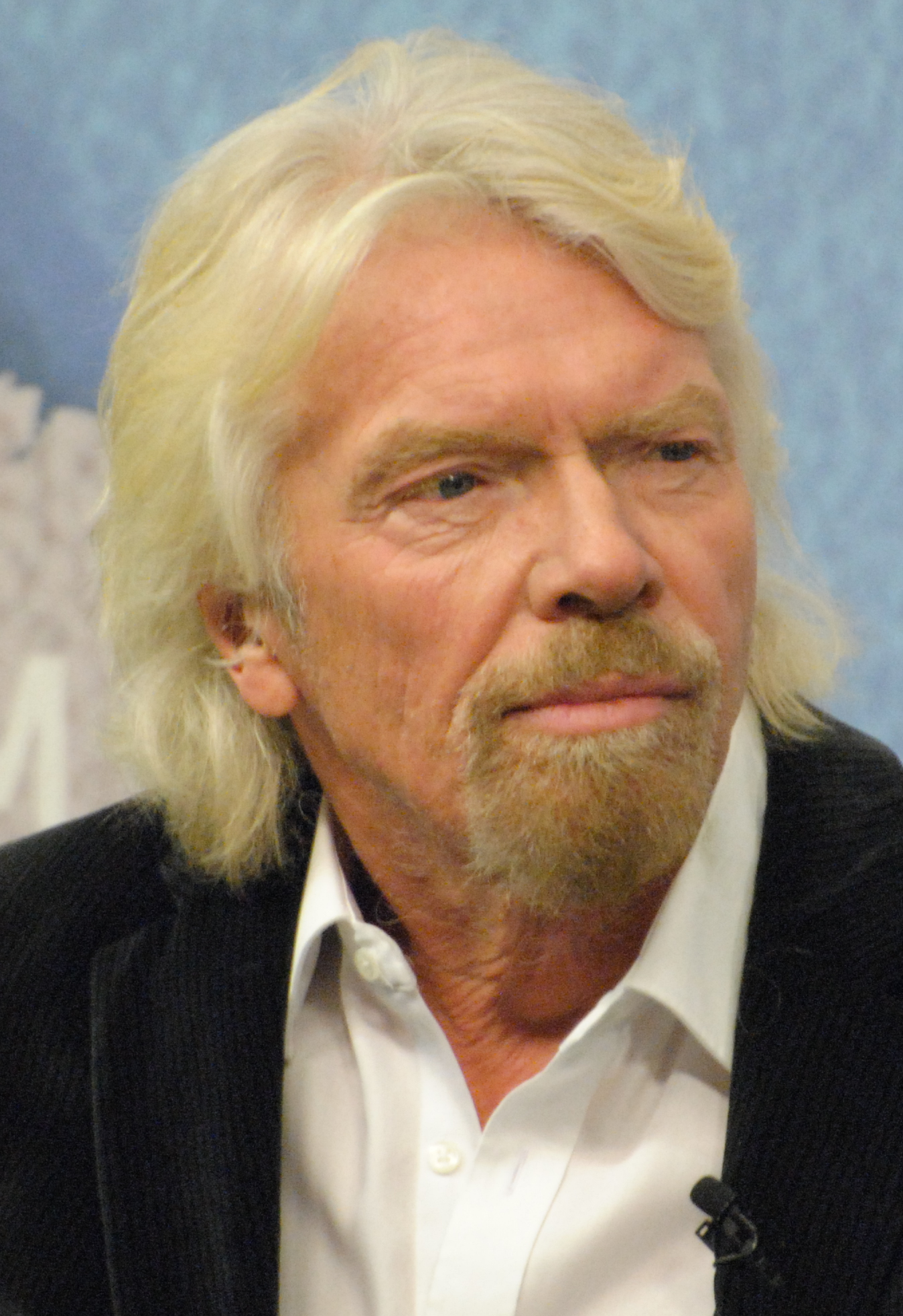
Richard Branson

- July 5 – Huey Lewis, American rock singer
- July 9 – Viktor Yanukovych, President of Ukraine
- July 11 – Pervez Hoodbhoy, Pakistani nuclear physicist and social activist
- July 12 – Eric Carr, American rock drummer, musician (Kiss) (d. 1991)
- July 13
  - Ma Ying-jeou, President of the Republic of China (Taiwan)
  - Jurelang Zedkaia, 5th President of the Marshall Islands (d. 2015)
- July 14
  - Chungsen Leung, Taiwanese-Canadian businessman, politician
  - James F. Capalino, American businessperson
- July 17
  - Tengku Sulaiman Shah, Malaysian corporate figure
  - Phoebe Snow, African-American singer-songwriter (d. 2011)
  - Stevo Stepanovski, Macedonian bibliophile
- July 18
  - Sir Richard Branson, British entrepreneur
  - Jack Layton, Canadian politician (d. 2011)
- July 19 – Per-Kristian Foss, Norwegian Minister of Finance
- July 26 – Susan George, British actress
- July 28
  - Soh Chin Aun, Malaysian footballer
  - Sir Tapley Seaton, Kittitian politician, 4th Governor-General of Saint Kitts and Nevis (d. 2023)
- July 29 – Jenny Holzer, American conceptual artist

=== August ===
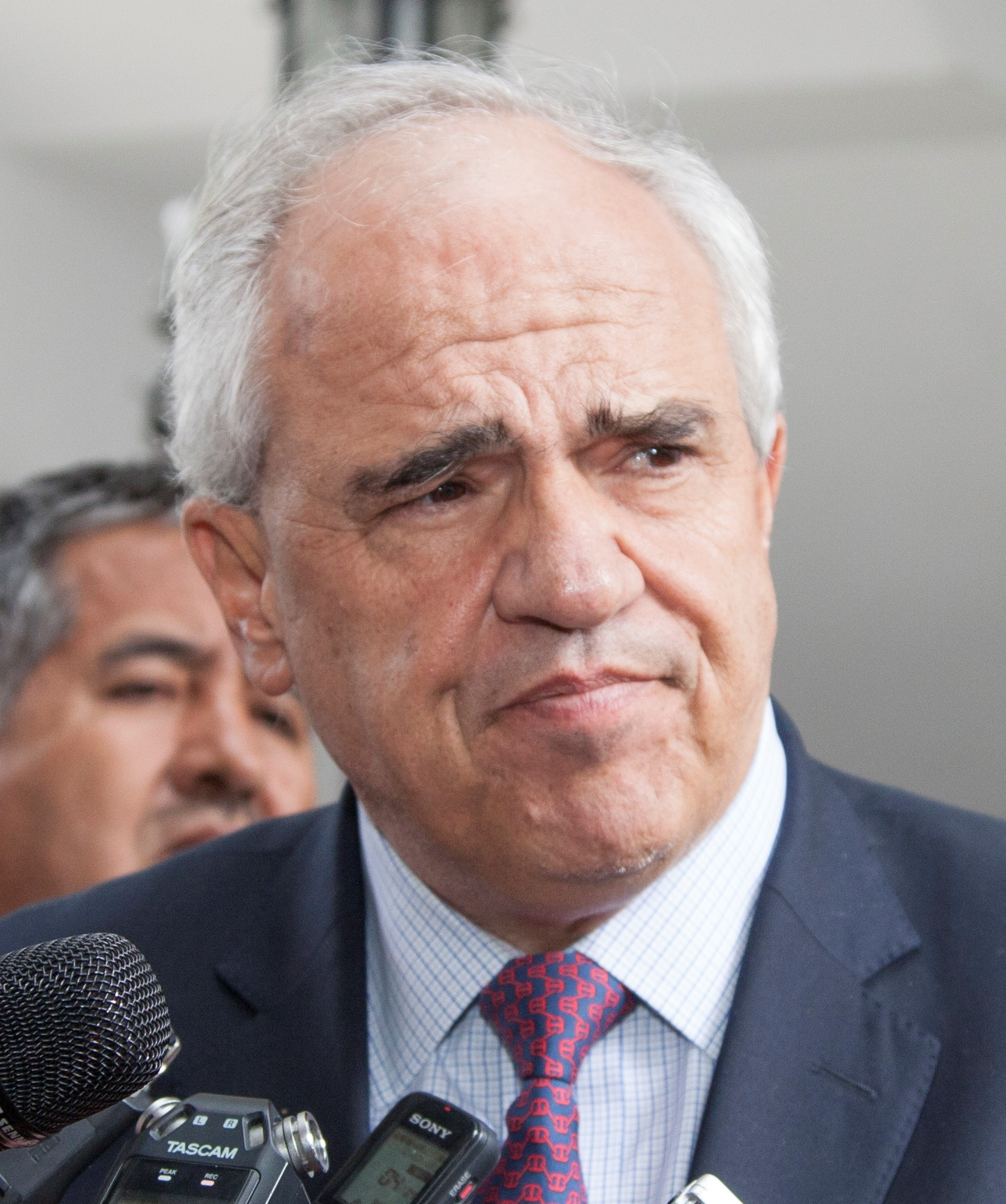
Ernesto Samper

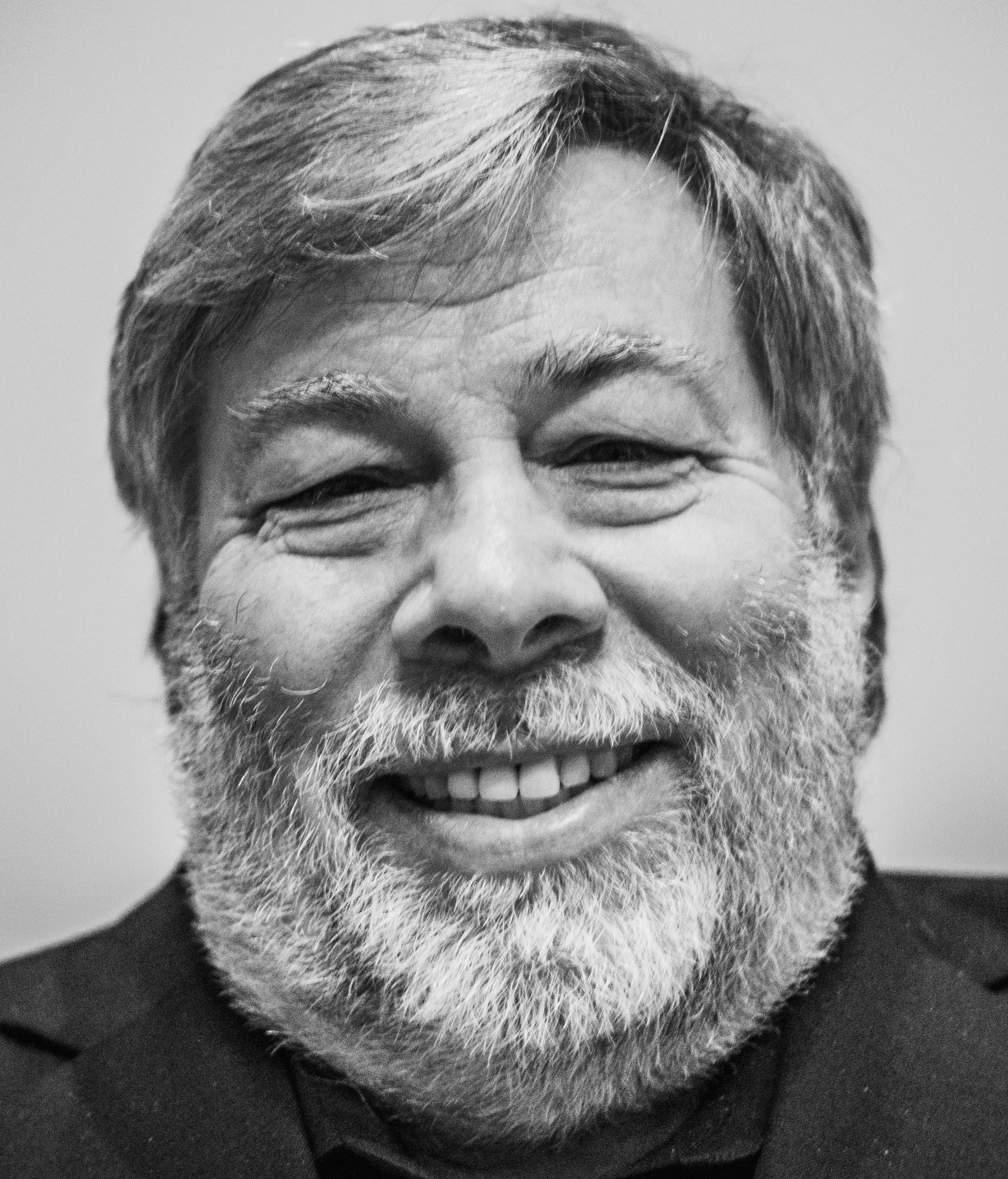
Steve Wozniak

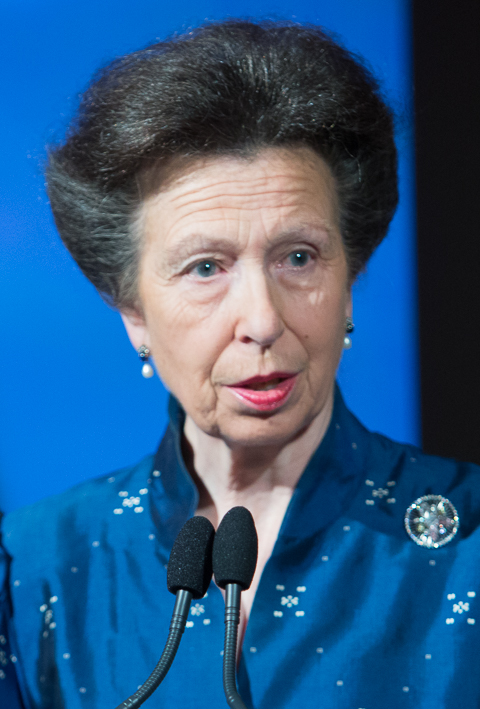
Anne, Princess Royal

- August 2 – Ken Kutaragi, Japanese businessman
- August 3
  - John Landis, American film director
  - Ernesto Samper, 29th President of Colombia
- August 5 – Rosi Mittermaier, German ski racer (d. 2023)
- August 7 – Alan Keyes, African-American conservative political activist
- August 8 – Lucjan Lis, Polish-German cyclist (d. 2015)
- August 9 – Anémone, French actress, filmmaker and political activist (d. 2019)
- August 11
  - Gennadiy Nikonov, Russian weapon designer (d. 2003)
  - Steve Wozniak, American inventor, engineer, programmer, philanthropist, and entrepreneur
- August 12 – Iris Berben, German actress
- August 15
  - Anne, Princess Royal, British royal, daughter of Queen Elizabeth II and the Duke of Edinburgh
  - Neil J. Gunther, Australian/American physicist, computer scientist
- August 16
  - Hasely Crawford, West Indian athlete
  - Marshall Manesh, Persian actor
- August 17 – Jose Apolinario Lozada Jr., Filipino diplomat, politician (d. 2018)
- August 19 – Sudha Murthy, Indian philanthropist and author
- August 21 – Arthur Bremer, American attempted assassin of George Wallace
- August 22 – Scooter Libby, American conservative political adviser
- August 23 – Alan Tam, Hong Kong singer and actor
- August 24 – Marc Aaronson, American astronomer
- August 27 – Charles Fleischer, American actor, stand-up comedian and voice artist

=== September ===
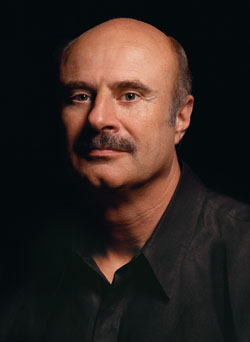
Phil McGraw

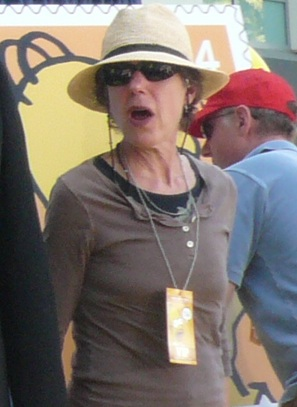
Julie Kavner

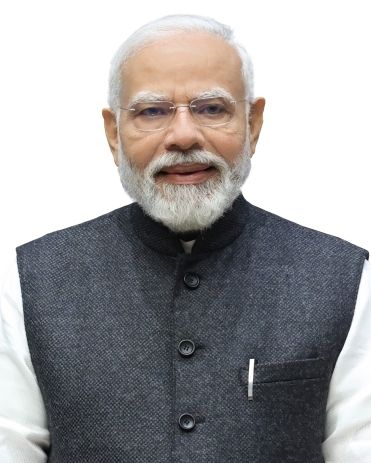
Narendra Modi

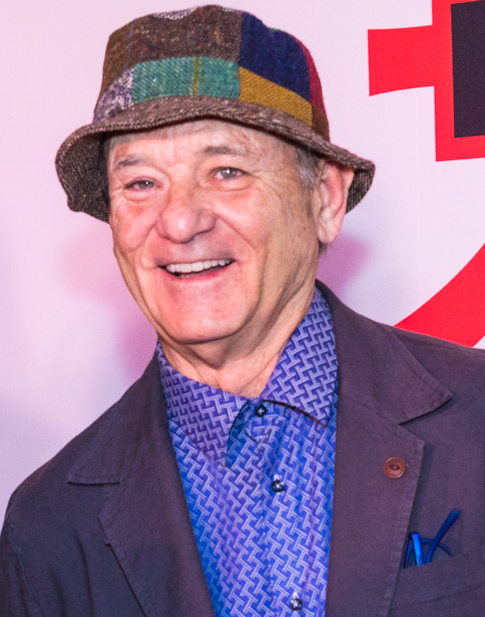
Bill Murray

- September 1
  - Mikhail Fradkov, Russian politician, Prime Minister of Russia (2004–2007)
  - Phil McGraw, American TV psychologist
- September 7 – Julie Kavner, American actress and the voice of Marge Simpson
- September 14
  - Paul Kossoff, British rock guitarist (Free) (d. 1976)
  - Masami Kuwashima, Japanese racing driver
  - Juan Carlos Boveri, Argentine author, psychologist, sociologist, and cultural anthropologist.
- September 15 – Rajiv Malhotra, Indian-American author
- September 16 – Henry Louis Gates Jr., American literary critic, professor, and historian
- September 17 – Narendra Modi, 14th Prime Minister of India
- September 21 – Bill Murray, American actor and comedian
- September 22 – Kirka Babitzin, Finnish singer (d. 2007)
- September 24
  - Feng Ting-kuo, Taiwanese politician (d. 2018)
  - Kristina Wayborn, Swedish actress
- September 26 – Mohamed Tarabulsi, Lebanese weightlifter (d.2002)
- September 27 – Cary-Hiroyuki Tagawa, Japanese actor (d. 2025)
- September 28 – Christina Hoff Sommers, American author and philosopher

=== October ===
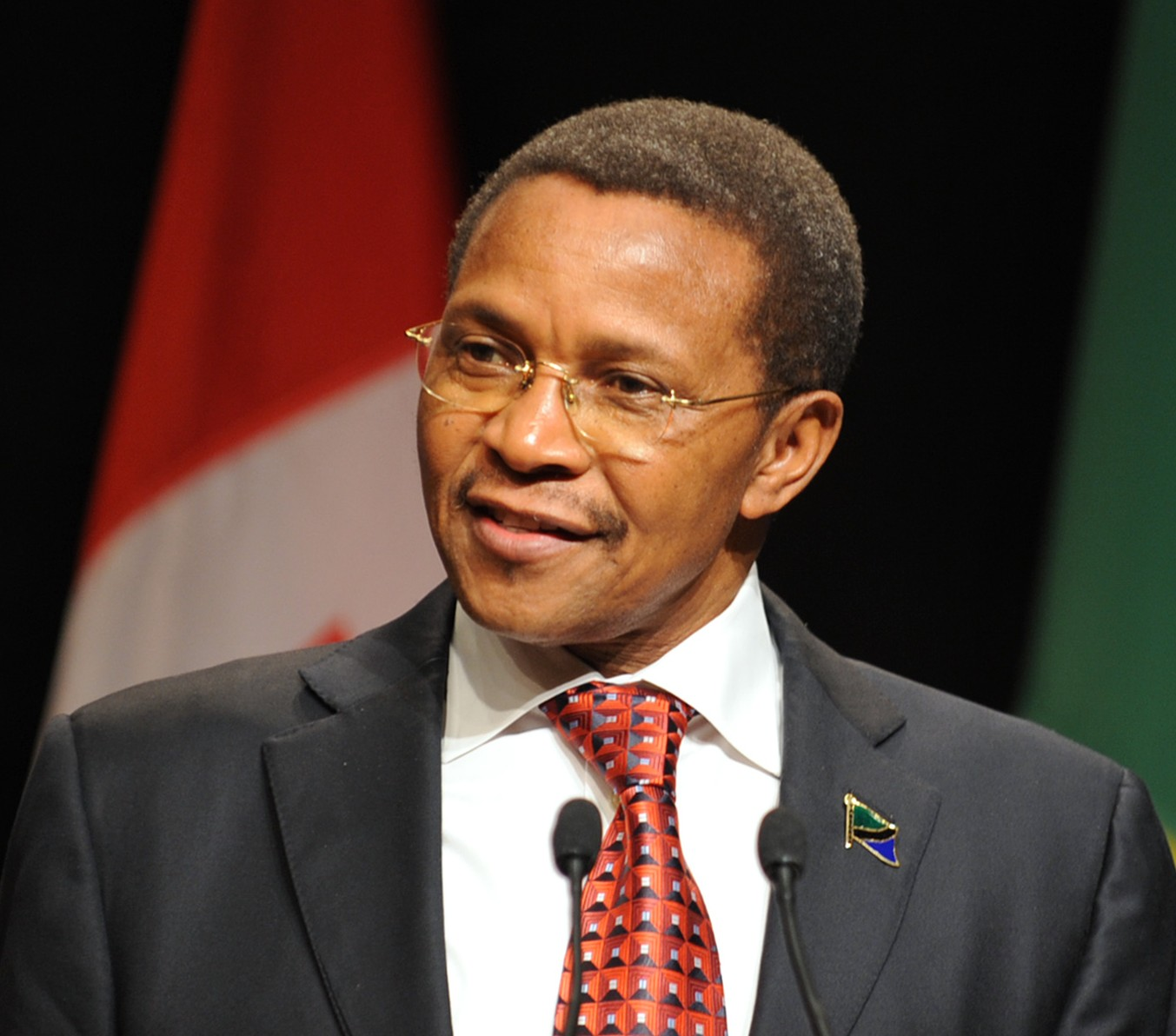
Jakaya Kikwete

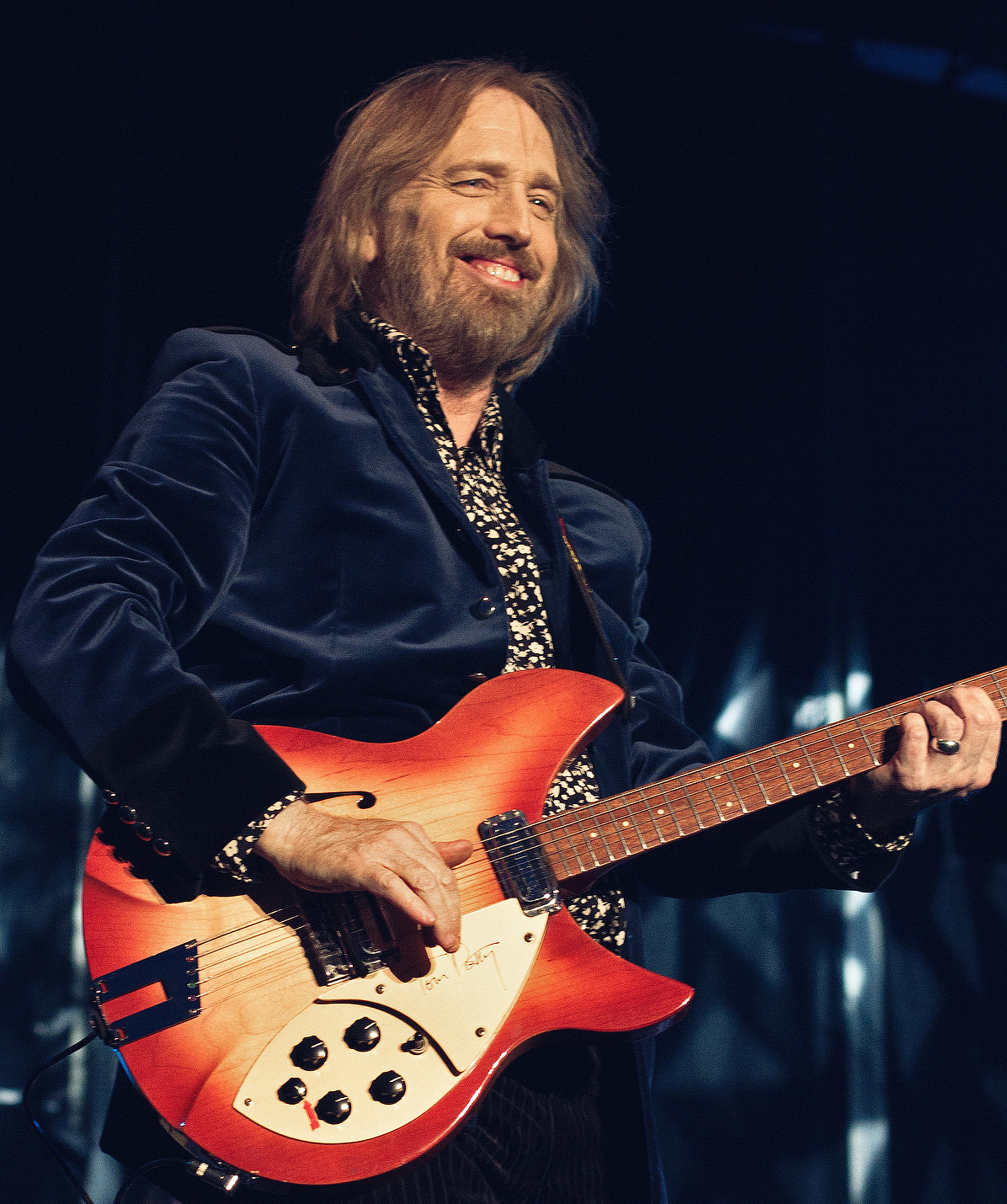
Tom Petty

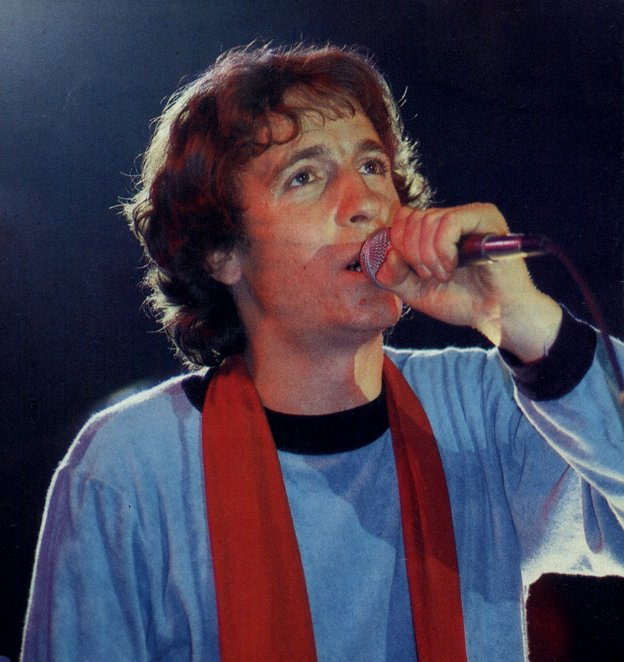
Rino Gaetano

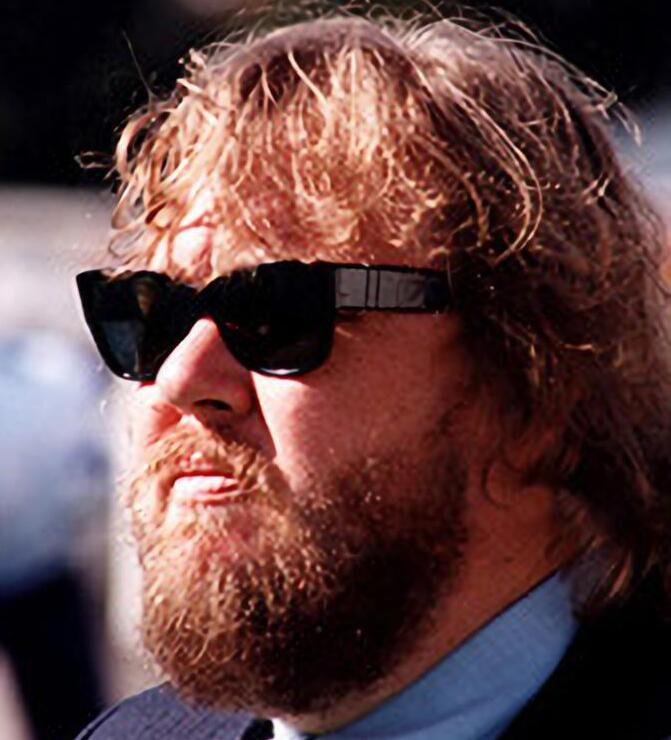
John Candy

- October 1
  - Boris Morukov, Russian astronaut (d. 2015)
  - Randy Quaid, American actor, comedian
- October 3 – Phyllis Nelson, American singer (d. 1998)
- October 5 – Laura Gemser, Indonesian born-Dutch actress
- October 7 – Jakaya Kikwete, 4th President of Tanzania
- October 9 – Jody Williams, American teacher, aid worker and recipient of the Nobel Peace Prize
- October 10
  - Ana Margarita Gasteazoro, Salvadoran activist (d. 1993)
  - Nora Roberts, American novelist
- October 12
  - Kaga Takeshi, Japanese actor
  - Pilar Pilapil, Filipina actress
  - Howard Rollins, American actor (d. 1996)
- October 14 - Arun Khetarpal, Indian Military Officer
- October 16 – Angry Grandpa, American YouTuber (d. 2017)
- October 18 – Wendy Wasserstein, American playwright (d. 2006)
- October 19 – Bishop Bill Ray, 10th Bishop of North Queensland
- October 20 – Tom Petty, American rock singer (d. 2017)
- October 22 – Donald Ramotar, 8th President of Guyana
- October 25
  - Walter Kwok, Hong Kong entrepreneur (d. 2018)
  - Chris Norman, English singer (Smokie)
- October 28
  - Annette Humpe, German singer (Ideal, Ich + Ich)
  - Sihem Bensedrine, Tunisian human rights activist
- October 29
  - Rino Gaetano, Italian musician and singer-songwriter (d. 1981)
  - Abdullah Gül, 11th President of Turkey
- October 31 – John Candy, Canadian comedian, actor (d. 1994)

=== November ===
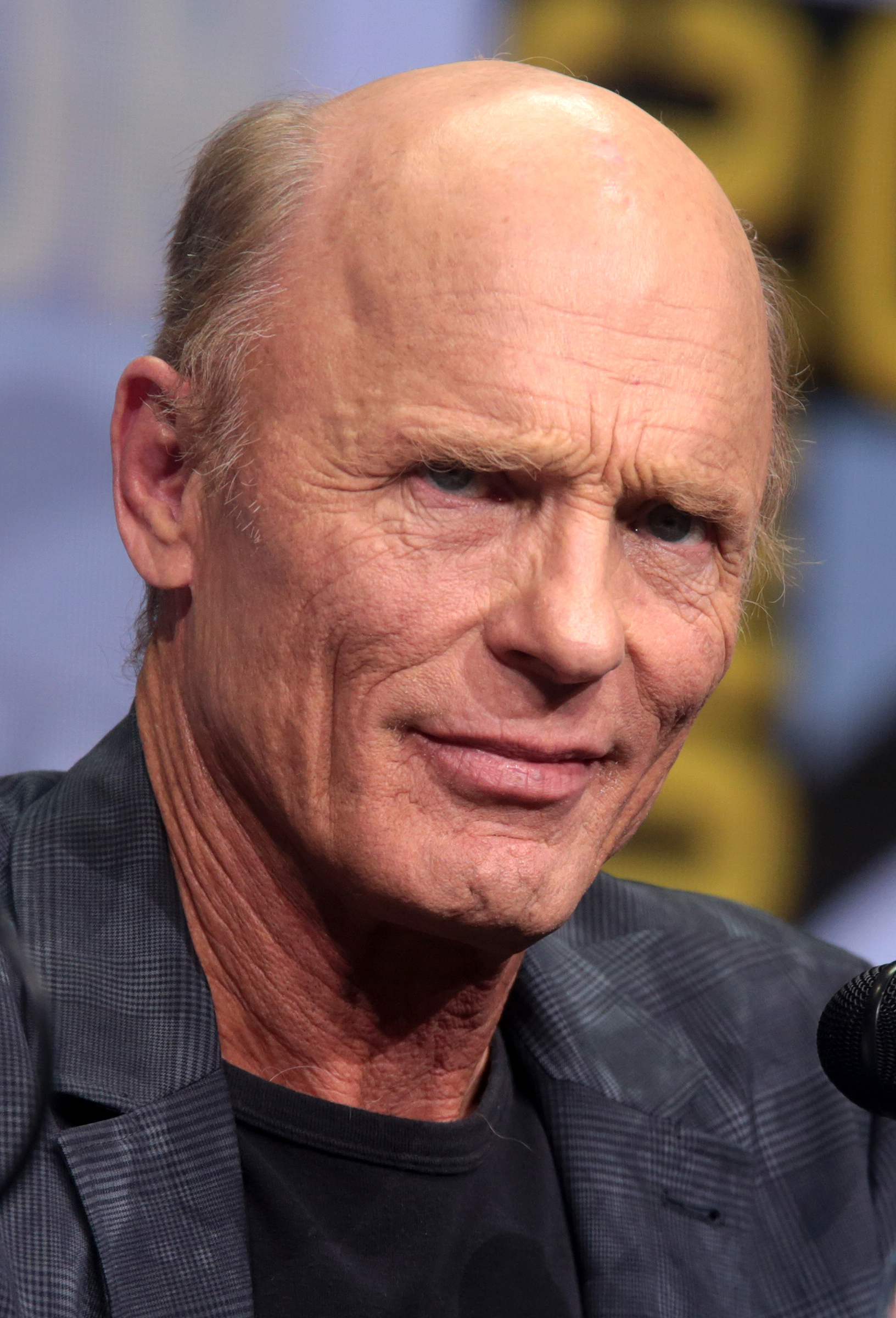
Ed Harris

- November 1 – Robert B. Laughlin, American Nobel Prize laureate
- November 3
  - Massimo Mongai, Italian author (d. 2016)
  - Nayyara Noor, Pakistani playback singer (d. 2022)
- November 4
  - Charles Frazier, American novelist
  - Markie Post, American actress (d. 2021)
- November 9 – Maravillas Rojo, Catalan politician
- November 10 – Debra Hill, American producer (d. 2005)
- November 17 – Roland Matthes, German swimmer (d. 2019)
- November 21 – Alberto Juantorena, Cuban athlete
- November 22 – Steven Van Zandt, American singer, songwriter, musician, producer, actor, and activist.
- November 23 – Chuck Schumer, American politician
- November 28
  - Ed Harris, American actor and film director
  - Russell Alan Hulse, American physicist, Nobel Prize laureate
- November 29 – Olavi Mäenpää, Finnish politician (d. 2018)

=== December ===
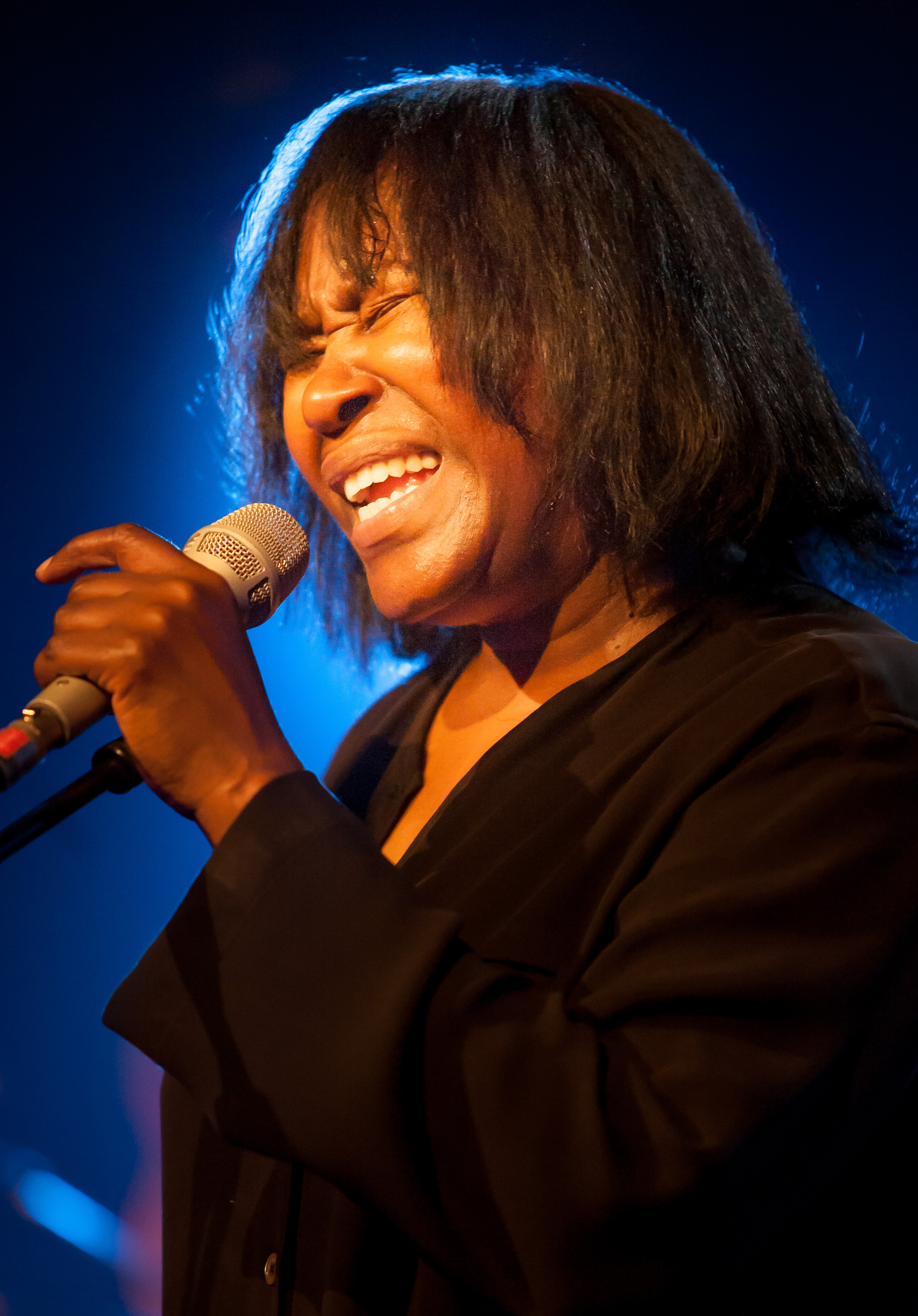
Joan Armatrading

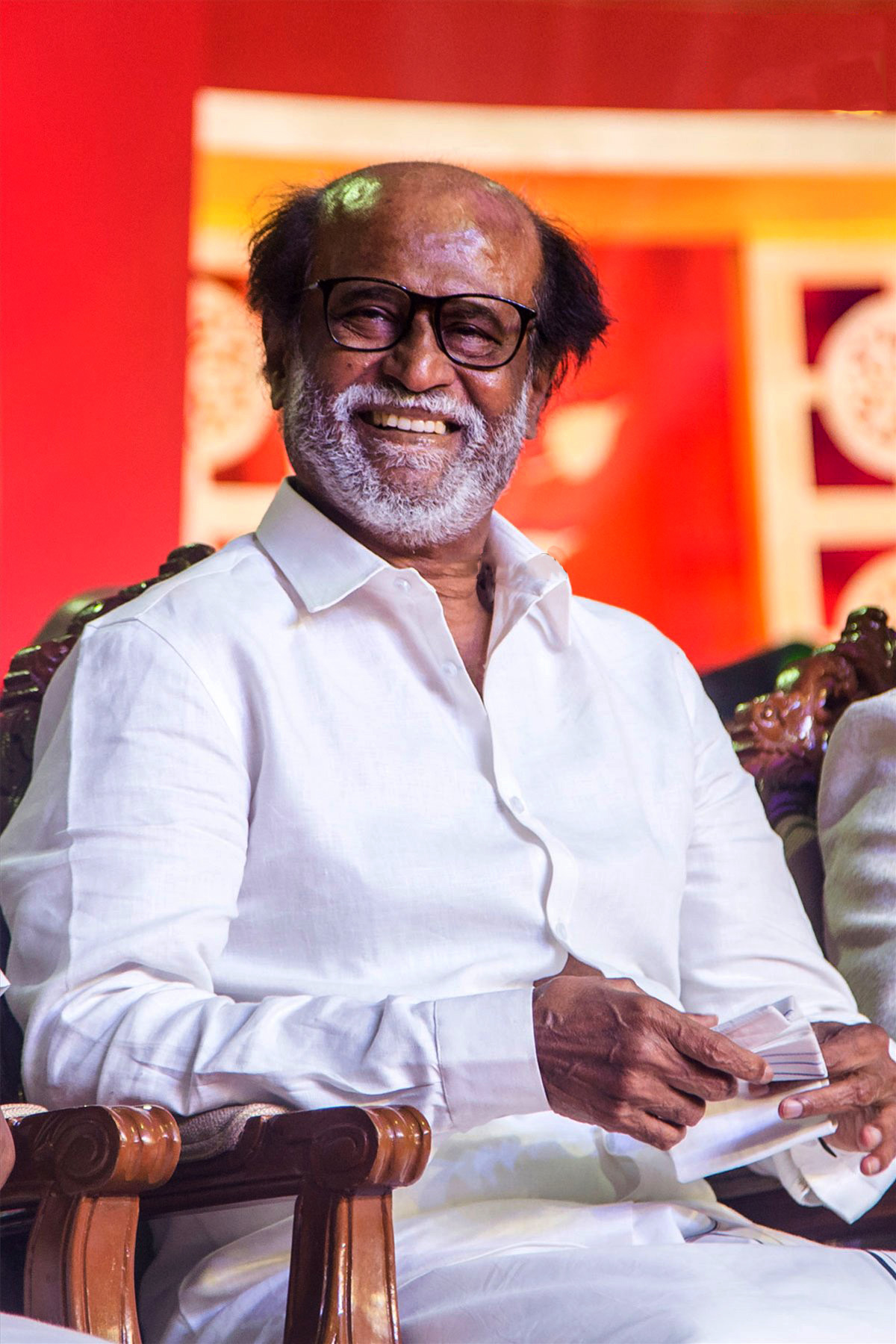
Rajinikanth

- December 1
  - Manju Bansal, Indian molecular biologist
  - Themba Dlamini, 9th Prime Minister of Swaziland
- December 2
  - Amin Saikal, Australian academic professor
  - Benjamin Stora, French historian
  - Paul Watson, Canadian-American founder of the Sea Shepherd Conservation Society
- December 5 – Camarón de la Isla, Spanish singer (d. 1992)
- December 7 – Hasanaga Sadigov, Azerbaijani ashik musician (d. 2018)
- December 9 – Joan Armatrading, St. Kitts-born English singer, songwriter
- December 12
  - Heiner Flassbeck, German economist, professor, publicist, political counselor and State secretary
  - Rajinikanth, Indian actor
- December 13 – Wendie Malick, American actress and former fashion model
- December 19 – Manny Trillo, Venezuelan-born American baseball player
- December 23 – Vicente del Bosque, Spanish footballer, manager
- December 25 – Yehuda Poliker, Israeli singer, songwriter, musician, and painter
- December 30 – Safiya Henderson-Holmes, African-American poet (d. 2001)

=== Date unknown ===
- Koibla Djimasta, 7th Prime Minister of Chad (d. 2007)
- Joseph Yodoyman, 4th Prime Minister of Chad (d. 1993)

== Deaths ==
=== January ===
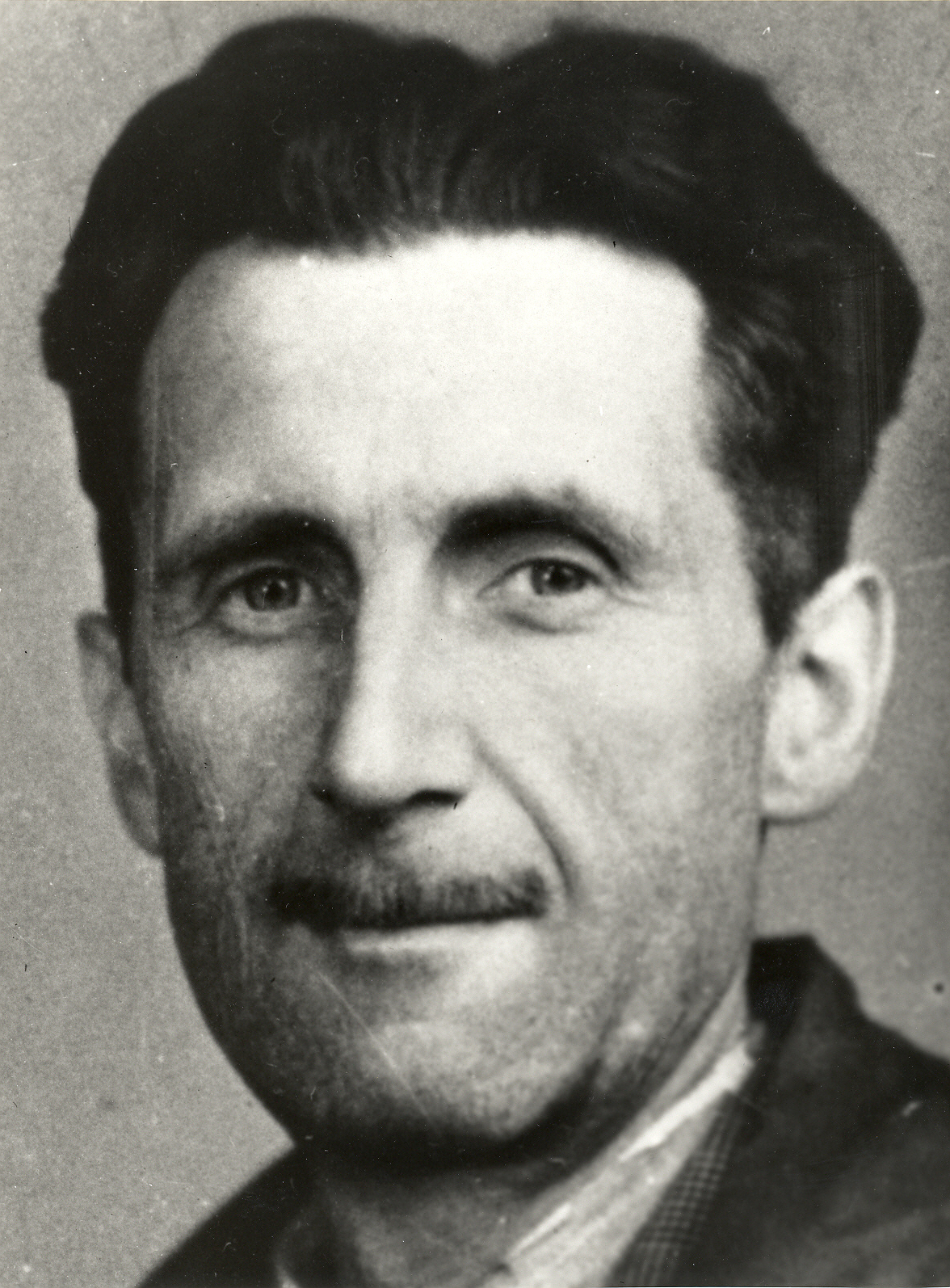
George Orwell

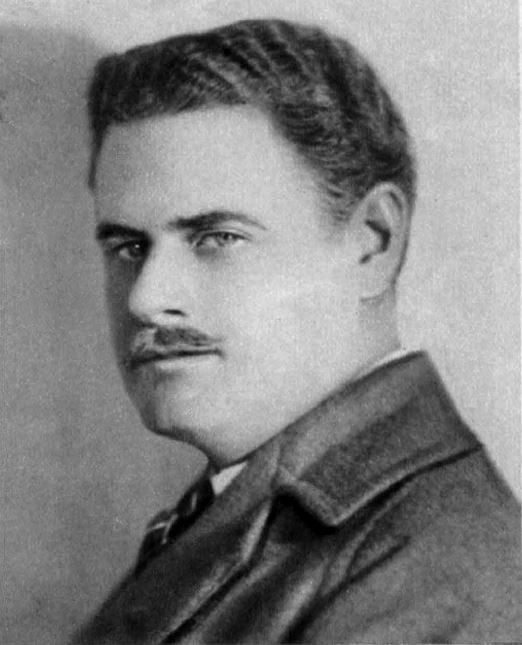
Alan Hale, Sr.

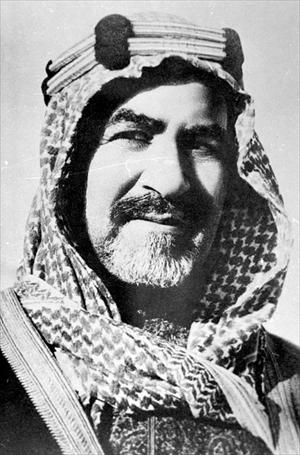
Ahmad Al-Jaber Al-Sabah

- January 1 – William A. Griffin, American Roman Catholic prelate and reverend (b. 1885)
- January 2
  - Emil Jannings, Swiss-born German actor (b. 1884)
  - Theophrastos Sakellaridis, Greek composer, conductor (b. 1883)
- January 3 – Tess Gardella, Italian-born American actress, dancer (b. 1894)
- January 7
  - Monty Banks, Italian comedian, director (b. 1897)
  - Alfonso Daniel Rodríguez Castelao, Spanish politician, writer, painter and doctor (b. 1886)
- January 8 – Joseph Schumpeter, Czech economist, political scientist (b. 1883)
- January 11 – James A. Colescott, American Imperial Wizard of the Ku Klux Klan (b. 1897)
- January 12 – John M. Stahl, American film director, producer (b. 1886)
- January 13 – Gino Frittelli, Italian painter (b. 1879)
- January 14 – Ieu Koeus, 9th Prime Minister of Cambodia (b. 1905)
- January 15 – Henry H. Arnold, American general and aviation pioneer (b. 1886)
- January 16 – Ali Moustafa Mosharafa, Egyptian physicist (b. 1898)
- January 17 – Seiichi Hatano, Japanese philosopher (b. 1877)
- January 18 – Horace Rice, Australian tennis player (b. 1872)
- January 20 – Ray Duggan, Australian speedway rider (b. 1913)
- January 21 – George Orwell, British author (b. 1903)
- January 22 – Alan Hale Sr., American actor (b. 1892)
- January 23 – Vasil Kolarov, Bulgarian Communist politician, former provisional head of State and 33rd Prime Minister of Bulgaria (b. 1877)
- January 29
  - Ahmad Al-Jaber Al-Sabah, Sheikh of Kuwait (b. 1885)
  - Kiyoshi Katsuki, Japanese general (b. 1881)

=== February ===
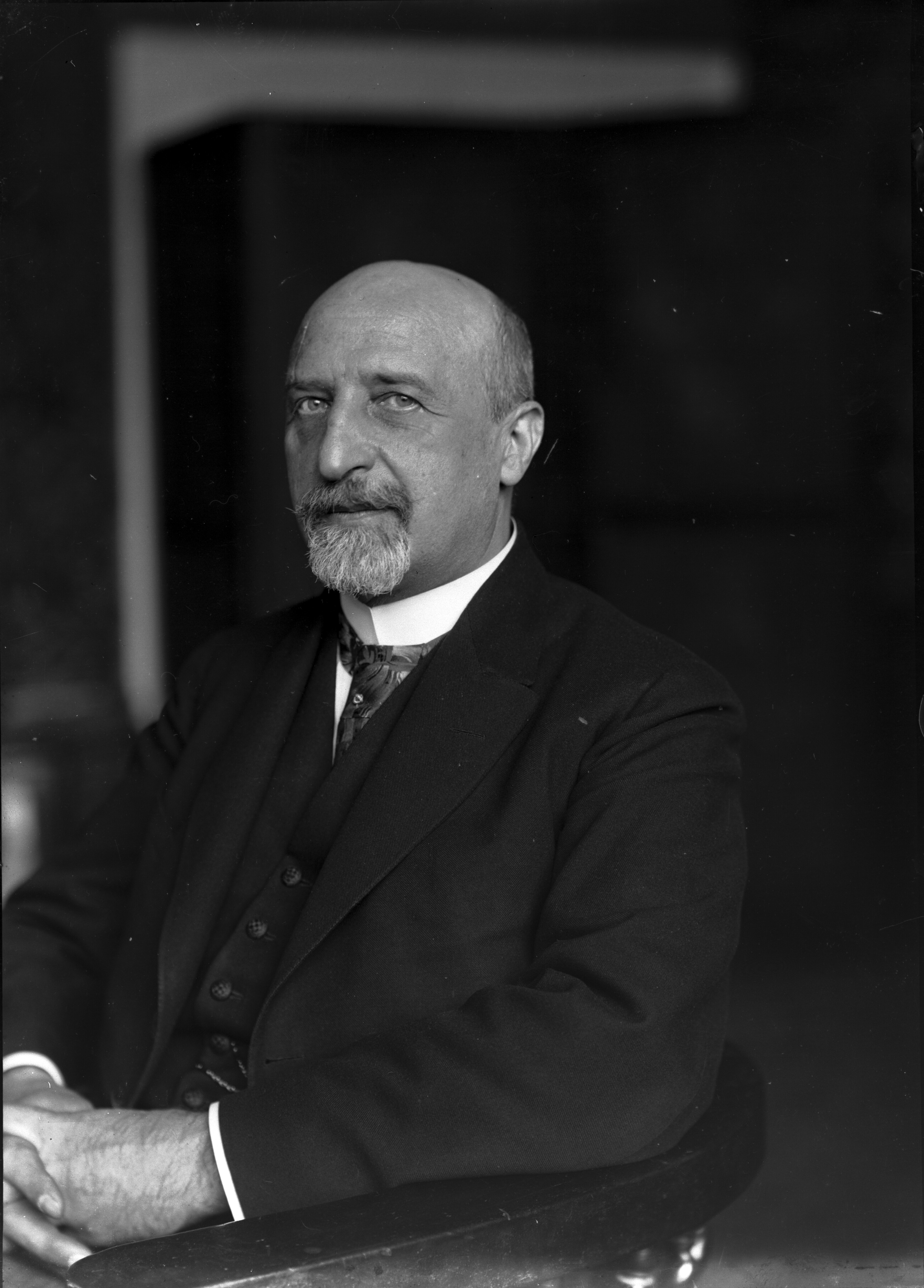
Karl Seitz

- February 3
  - Lionel Cripps, Rhodesian politician (b. 1863)
  - Karl Seitz, Austrian politician, 1st President of Austria (b. 1869)
- February 6 – Georges Imbert, Alsatian chemist (b. 1884)
- February 7
  - D. K. Broster, British historical novelist (b. 1877)
  - Masao Inoue, Japanese actor, director (b. 1881)
  - William Murphy, American Roman Catholic clergyman, bishop and reverend (b. 1885)
- February 9
  - Abdul Qadir, Indian editor (b. 1874)
  - Franz Justus Rarkowski, German Roman Catholic bishop and reverend (b. 1873)
  - Ted Theodore, Australian politician, Premier of Queensland (b. 1884)
- February 10 – Marcel Mauss, French sociologist (b. 1872)
- February 11 – Kiki Cuyler, American baseball player (Chicago Cubs), MLB Hall of Fame member (b. 1898)
- February 12 – Bernard Meninsky, Ukrainian-born British artist, painter, draughtsman and teacher (b. 1891)
- February 13 – Rafael Sabatini, Italian writer (b. 1875)
- February 14
  - Cecilio Guzmán de Rojas, Bolivian painter (b. 1899)
  - Karl Guthe Jansky, American physicist, radio engineer and father of radio astronomy (b. 1905)
- February 16
  - Johannes Hjelmslev, Danish mathematician (b. 1873)
  - Mile-a-Minute Murphy, American cyclist (b. 1870)
- February 21 – Gerhard Kowalewski, German mathematician (b. 1876)
- February 23 – Piotr Śmietański, Polish executioner (b. 1899)
- February 25
  - Ignatius Arnoz, Czech Roman Catholic prelate and reverend (b. 1885)
  - George Minot, American physician, recipient of the Nobel Prize in Physiology or Medicine (b. 1885)
- February 26 – Harry Lauder, British entertainer (b. 1870)
- February 27 – Yvan Goll, French dramatist (b. 1891)

=== March ===
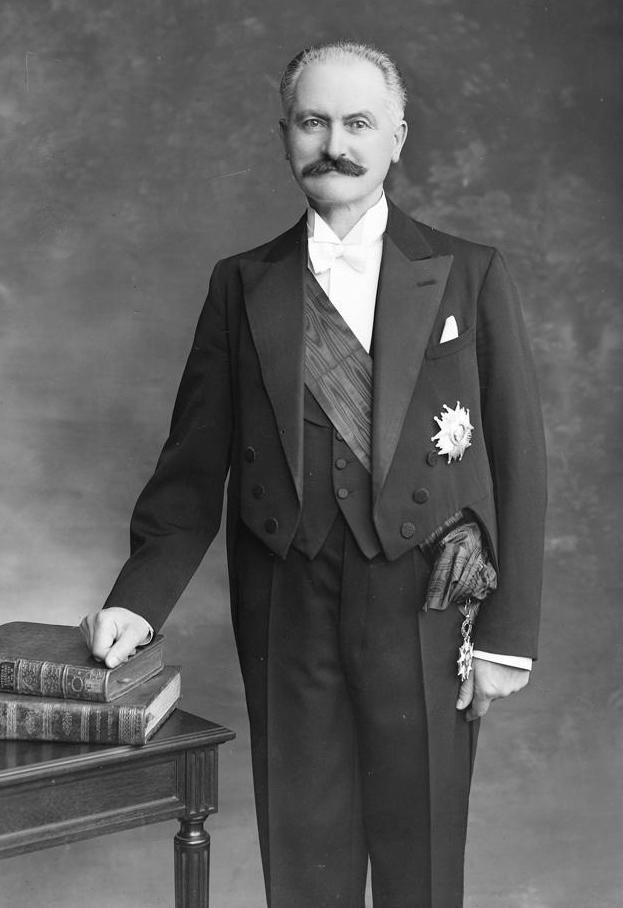
Albert François Lebrun

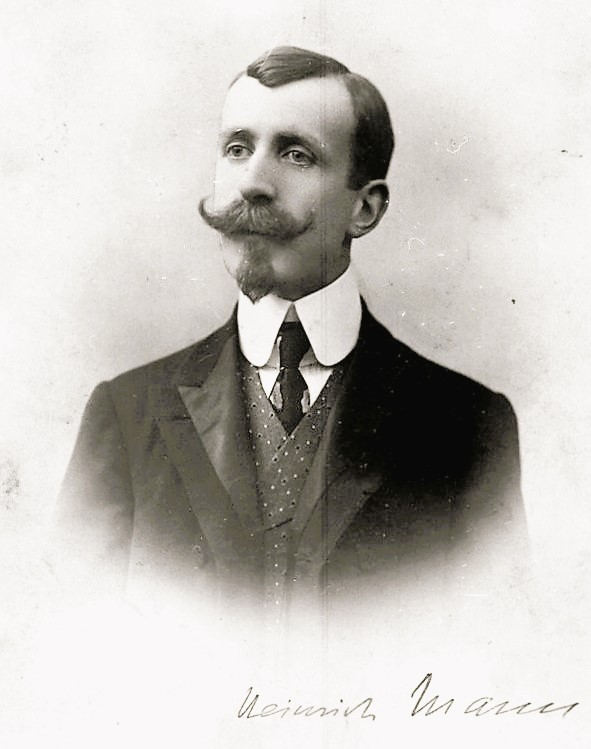
Heinrich Mann

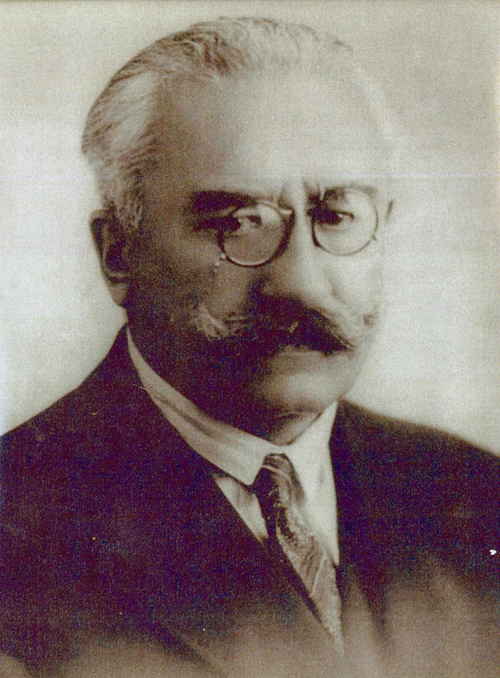
Alexandru Vaida-Voevod

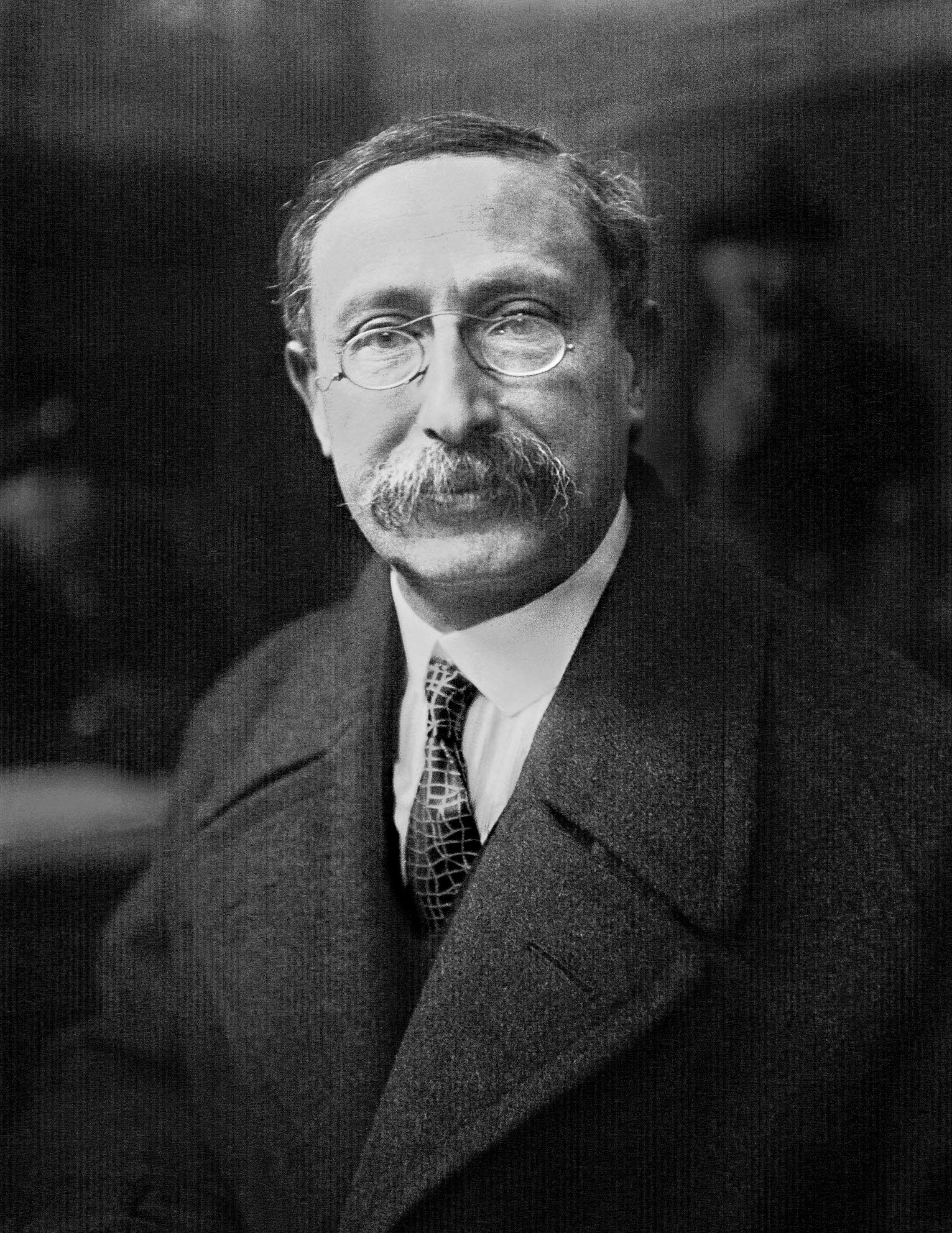
Leon Blum

- March 2 – Rosli Dhobi, Malay Sarawakian nationalist (b. 1932)
- March 4 – Anthony Holles, British actor (b. 1901)
- March 5
  - Sid Grauman, American theatre entrepreneur (b. 1879)
  - Edgar Lee Masters, American poet (b. 1868)
- March 6
  - Albert Lebrun, French politician, 15th President of France (b. 1871)
  - Harry Redfern, British architect (b. 1861)
  - Lew Lehr, American comedian (b. 1895)
- March 10 – Marguerite De La Motte, American actress (b. 1902)
- March 11
  - Ralph Freeman, British engineer (b. 1880)
  - Heinrich Mann, German novelist (b. 1871)
  - Brock Pemberton, American theatrical producer (b. 1885)
- March 15
  - Alexander Kabiskoy, Soviet WWII heroine (b. 1920)
  - Carl Storck, 3rd President of the National Football League (b. 1892)
- March 18 – Väinö Kivilinna, Finnish teacher, activist and politician (b. 1875)
- March 19
  - Edgar Rice Burroughs, American author (Tarzan) (b. 1875)
  - Sir Norman Haworth, British chemist, Nobel Prize laureate (b. 1883)
  - Alexandru Vaida-Voevod, 28th Prime Minister of Romania (b. 1872)
- March 20 – Frederick Twort, English bacteriologist (b. 1877)
- March 21 – Katherine Grey, American actress (b. 1873)
- March 22 – Emmanuel Mounier, French philosopher (b. 1905)
- March 24
  - James Rudolph Garfield, American politician (b. 1865)
  - Harold Laski, British political theorist, economist (b. 1893)
- March 25
  - Frank Buck, American animal collector (b. 1884)
  - Frances Micklethwait, British chemist (b. 1867)
- March 27 – Solomone Ula Ata, Prime Minister of Tonga (b. 1883)
- March 30
  - Léon Blum, French statesman, 2-time Prime Minister of France (b. 1872)
  - Joe Yule, British entertainer, father of Mickey Rooney (b. 1894)

=== April ===
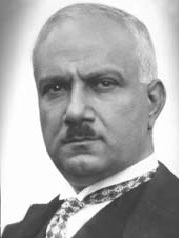
Recep Peker

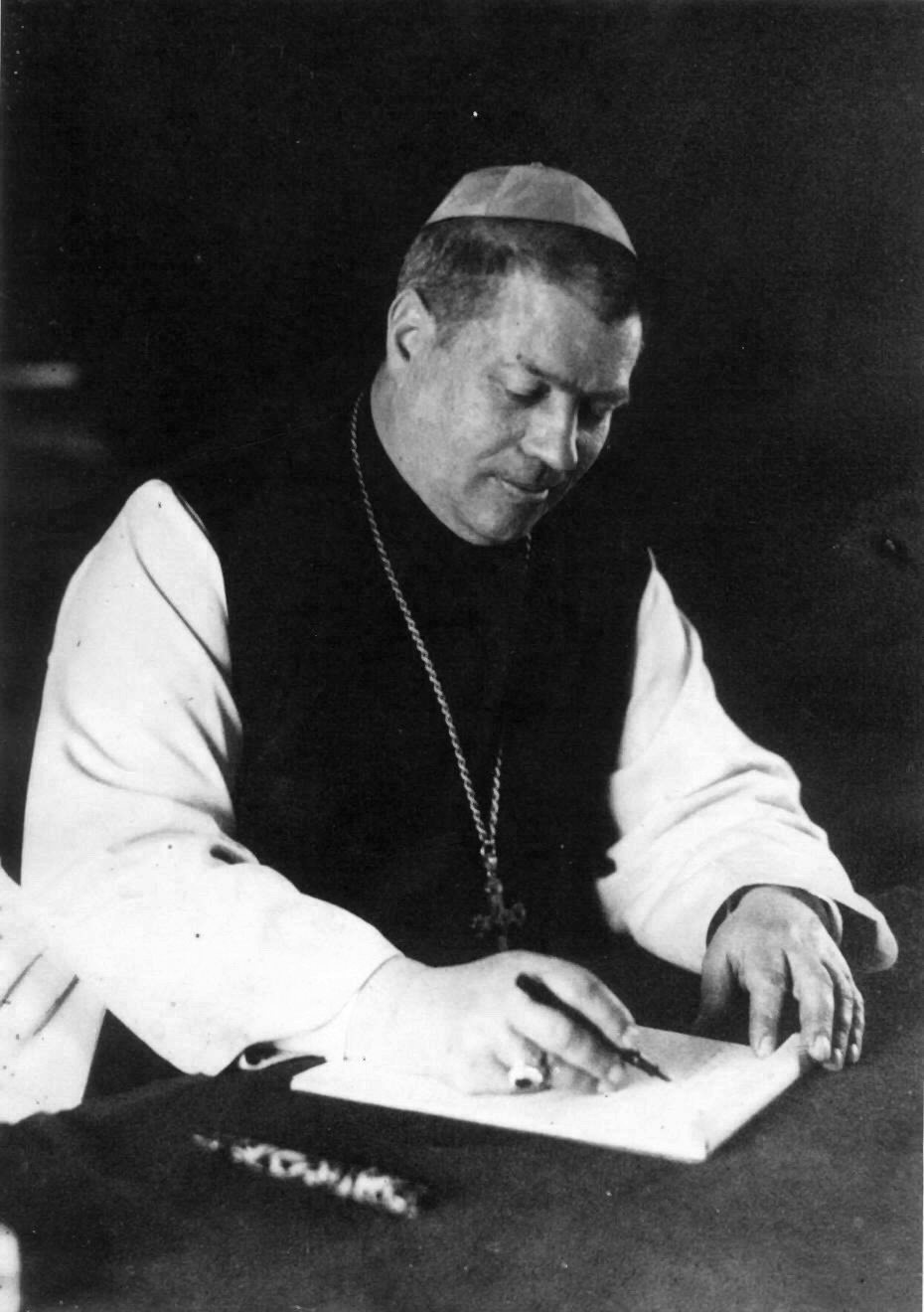
Reverend Franciscus Janssens

- April 1
  - F. O. Matthiessen, American historian, literary critic (b. 1902)
  - Recep Peker, Turkish officer, politician and 6th Prime Minister of Turkey (b. 1889)
- April 3 – Kurt Weill, German-born composer (b. 1900)
- April 5 – Charles Binaggio, American gangster (b. 1909)
- April 7 – Walter Huston, Canadian-born American actor (b. 1883)
- April 8 – Vaslav Nijinsky, Soviet ballet dancer, choreographer (b. 1889)
- April 10
  - Fevzi Çakmak, Turkish military officer, statesman and Prime Minister of Turkey (b. 1876)
  - Alfred Fischer, German architect (b. 1881)
- April 11 – Bainbridge Colby, United States Secretary of State (b. 1869)
- April 13
  - Saleh al-Ali, Syrian revolt leader (b. 1884)
  - James Morrison, Canadian Roman Catholic bishop and reverend (b. 1861)
- April 14 – Ramana Maharshi, Indian sage and jivanmukta (b. 1879)
- April 16
  - Henry J. Knauf, American politician (b. 1891)
  - Arnaud Massy, French golfer (b. 1877)
- April 17 – Władysław Filipkowski, Polish military commander (b. 1892)
- April 23
  - Gemma Bellincioni, Italian soprano (b. 1864)
  - Franciscus Janssens, Dutch Roman Catholic abbot and reverend (b. 1881)
- April 26 – Henry Wadsworth Longfellow Dana, American academic and activist (b. 1881)
  - George Murray Hulbert, American politician (b. 1881)
  - Hobart Cavanaugh, American character actor (b. 1886)
  - Karel Koželuh, Czech tennis player (b. 1895)
- April 30 – Francesco Jovine, Italian writer, author (b. 1902)

=== May ===
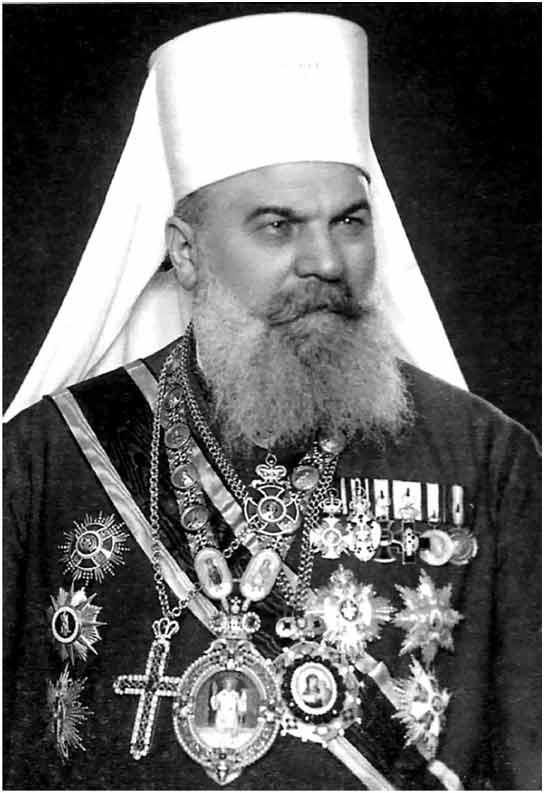
Gavrilo V, Serbian Patriarch

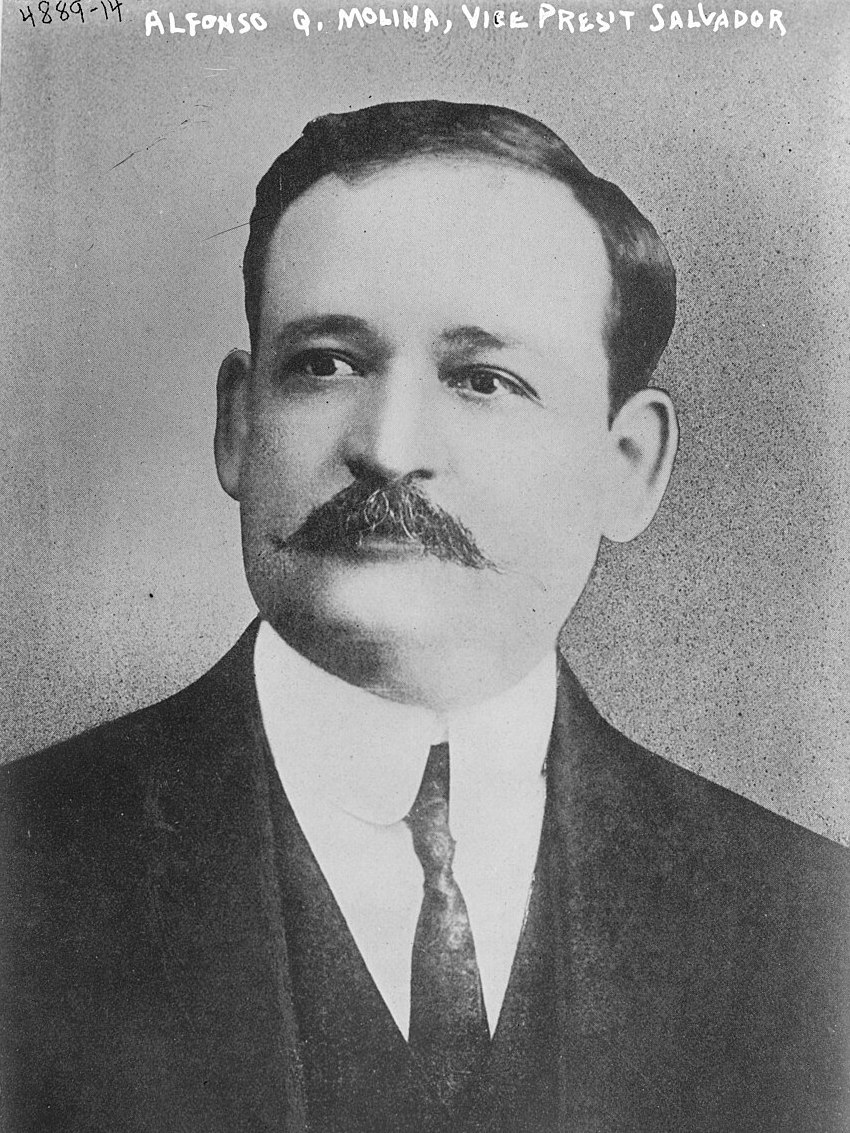
Alfonso Quiñónez Molina

- May 1 – Lothrop Stoddard, American eugenicist (b. 1883)
- May 6 – Víctor Manuel Román y Reyes, Nicaraguan politician, 23rd President of Nicaragua (b. 1872)
- May 7 – Gavrilo V, Serbian Patriarch (b. 1881)
- May 8 – Vital Brazil, Brazilian physician and immunologist (b. 1865)
- May 9
  - Harry Stubbs, British-born American actor (b. 1874)
  - Esteban Terradas i Illa, Andorran mathematician, scientist and engineer (b. 1883)
  - Muhammad Rifat, Egyptian Radio Quran reciter (b. 1882)
- May 10
  - John Gould Fletcher, American poet (b. 1886)
  - Belle da Costa Greene, American librarian, bibliographer and archivist (b. 1883)
- May 11 – Cedric Holland, British admiral (b. 1889)
- May 12 – Harold Basil Christian, South African-Rhodesian horticulturalist (b. 1871)
- May 18 – Henri Cihoski, Romanian general and politician (b. 1871)
- May 19
  - Giuseppe Garibaldi II, Italian soldier, patriot, revolutionary and grandson of Italian patriot Giuseppe Garibaldi (b. 1879)
  - Giuseppina Suriano, Italian Roman Catholic nun and blessed (b. 1915)
- May 22
  - Andrew McDonald, British Roman Catholic clergyman, bishop and reverend (b. 1871)
  - Alfonso Quiñónez Molina, Salvadoran politician, physician, and three-time president of El Salvador (b. 1874)
- May 24
  - Isidore Ngei Ko Lat, Burmese catechist, Roman Catholic priest, martyr and blessed (killed in action) (b. 1918)
  - Peter Petrovich Troyanskii, Soviet educator and scholar (b. 1894)
  - Mario Vergara, Italian Roman Catholic priest, martyr and blessed (killed in action) (b. 1910)
  - Archibald Wavell, 1st Earl Wavell, British field marshal (b. 1883)
- May 25 – Nicolae Ciupercă, Romanian general and politician (b. 1882)
- May 26 – Stanisław Kętrzyński, Polish historian, diplomat (b. 1878)
- May 28 – Vicente Sotto, Filipino politician (b. 1877)

=== June ===
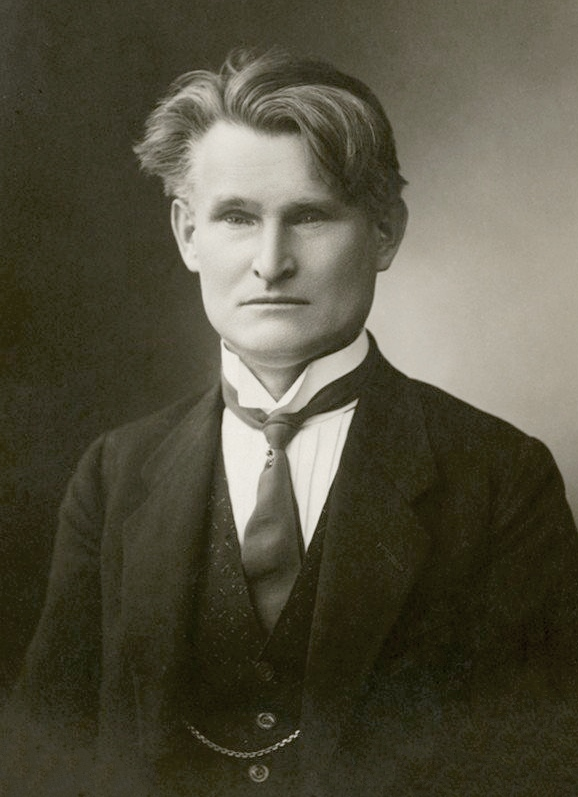
Kazys Grinius

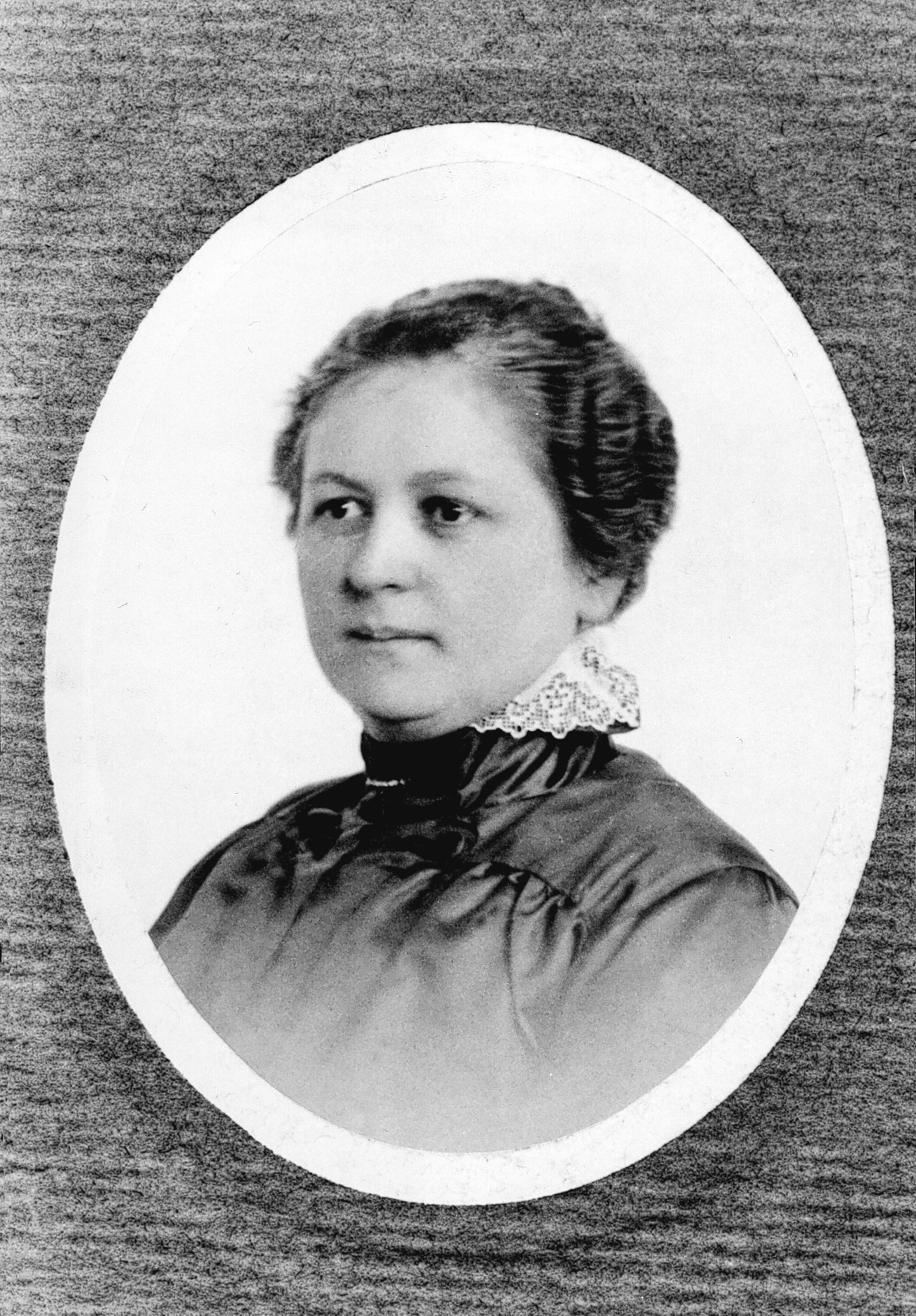
Melitta Bentz

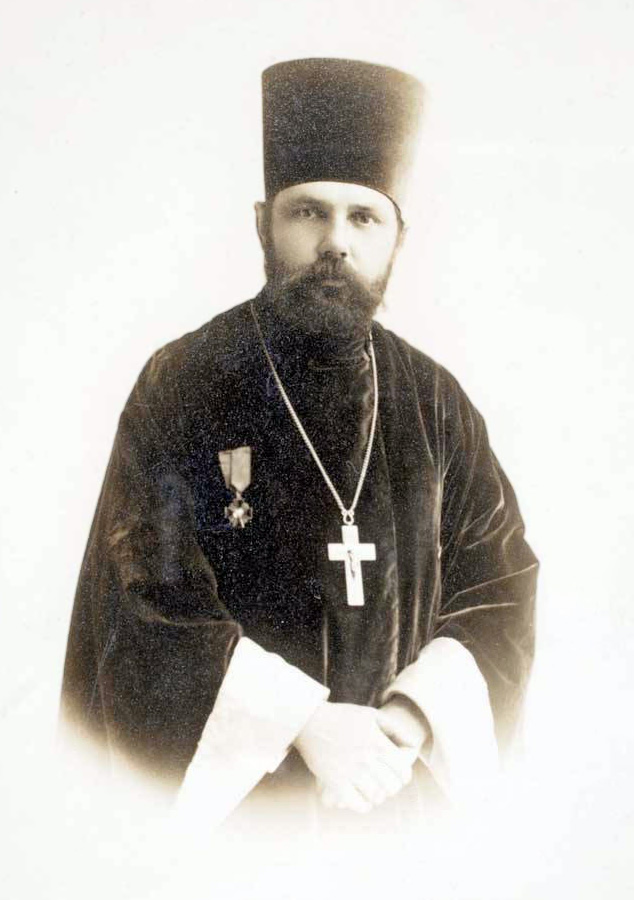
Metropolitan Theophilus Pashkovsky

- June 3 – Ahmad Tajuddin, Sultan of Brunei (b. 1913)
- June 4
  - Carmen Baroja, Spanish writer, ethnologist (b. 1883)
  - George Cecil Ives, German-born British poet, writer, penal reformer and early gay rights campaigner (b. 1867)
  - Kazys Grinius, 3rd President of Lithuania (b. 1866)
- June 5 – Miklós Bánffy, Hungarian nobleman, politician and novelist (b. 1873)
- June 6 – William Wadsworth, American actor (b. 1874)
- June 9 – Denis Auguste Duchêne, French general (b. 1862)
- June 20 – Etsu Inagaki Sugimoto, Japanese autobiographer, novelist (b. 1874)
- June 22 – Jane Cowl, American actress (b. 1883)
- June 24 – Darwan Singh Negi, Indian Victoria Cross recipient (b. 1881)
- June 26 – Antonina Nezhdanova, Soviet soprano (b. 1873)
- June 27
  - Záviš Kalandra, Czechoslovak historian, theorist (b. 1902)
  - Theophilus Pashkovsky, American Orthodox archbishop, metropolitan (b. 1874)
- June 28 – Archbishop Makarios II (b. 1870)
- June 29 – Melitta Bentz, German entrepreneur, who invented the coffee filter in 1908 (b. 1873)

=== July ===
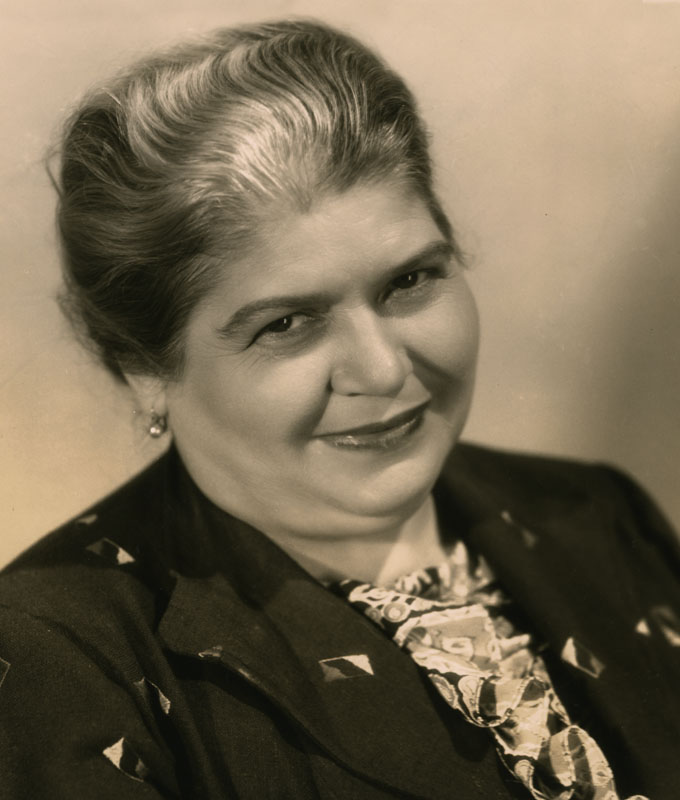
Antonie Nedošinská

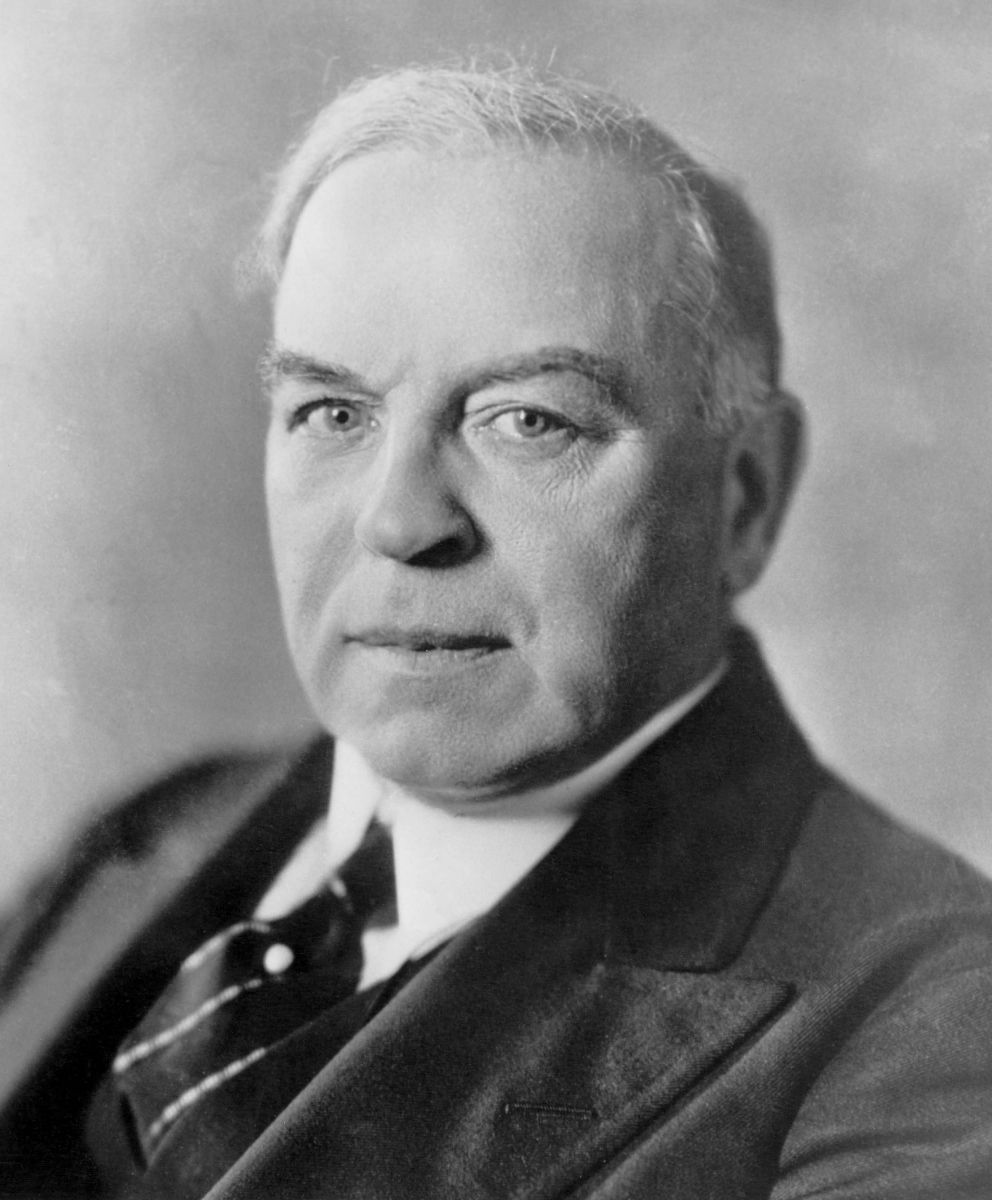
William Lyon Mackenzie King

- July 1 – Eliel Saarinen, Finnish architect (b. 1873)
- July 5 – Salvatore Giuliano, Italian bandit (b. 1922)
- July 7 – Fats Navarro, American jazz trumpet player (b. 1923)
- July 8
  - Helen Holmes, American actress (b. 1892)
  - Othmar Spann, Austrian philosopher and economist (b. 1878)
- July 10 – Richard Maury, American naturalized Argentine engineer (b. 1882)
- July 11 – Buddy DeSylva, American songwriter (b. 1895)
- July 12
  - Lev Galler, Soviet admiral (b. 1883)
  - Elsie de Wolfe, American socialite and interior decorator (b. 1859)
- July 17
  - Evangeline Booth, 4th General of The Salvation Army (b. 1865)
  - Antonie Nedošinská, Czech actress (b. 1885)
- July 18 – Mignon Talbot, American paleontologist (b. 1869)
- July 21 – Rex Ingram, Irish-born American director (b. 1892)
- July 22 – William Lyon Mackenzie King, Canadian political leader, 10th Prime Minister of Canada (b. 1874)
- July 24 – Zeffie Tilbury, English stage and film actress (b. 1863)
- July 27 – Marta Steinsvik, Norwegian author (b. 1877)
- July 28 – Kevin Budden, Australian amateur herpetologist (b. 1930)
- July 30 – Guilhermina Suggia, Portuguese cellist (b. 1885)

=== August ===
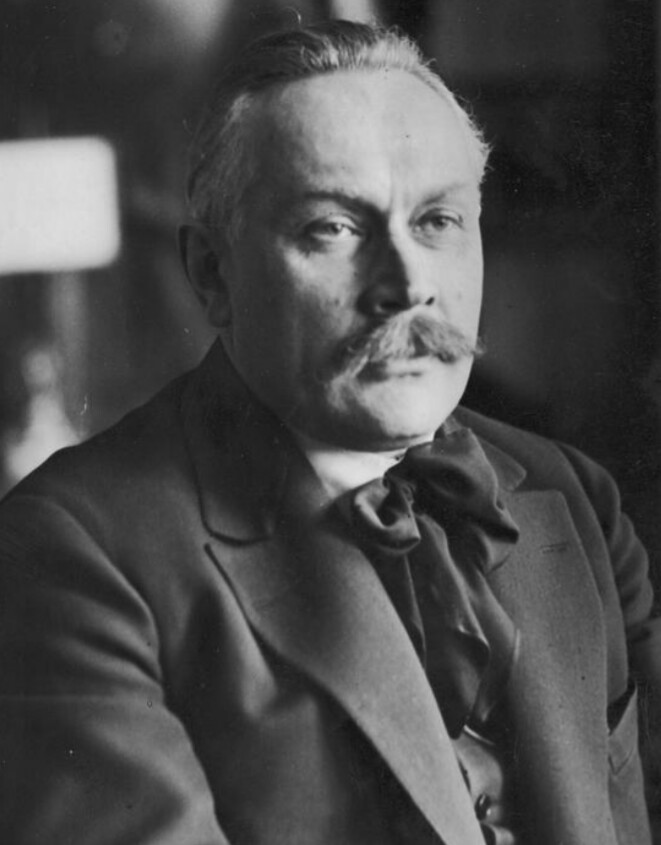
Tadeusz Tomaszewski

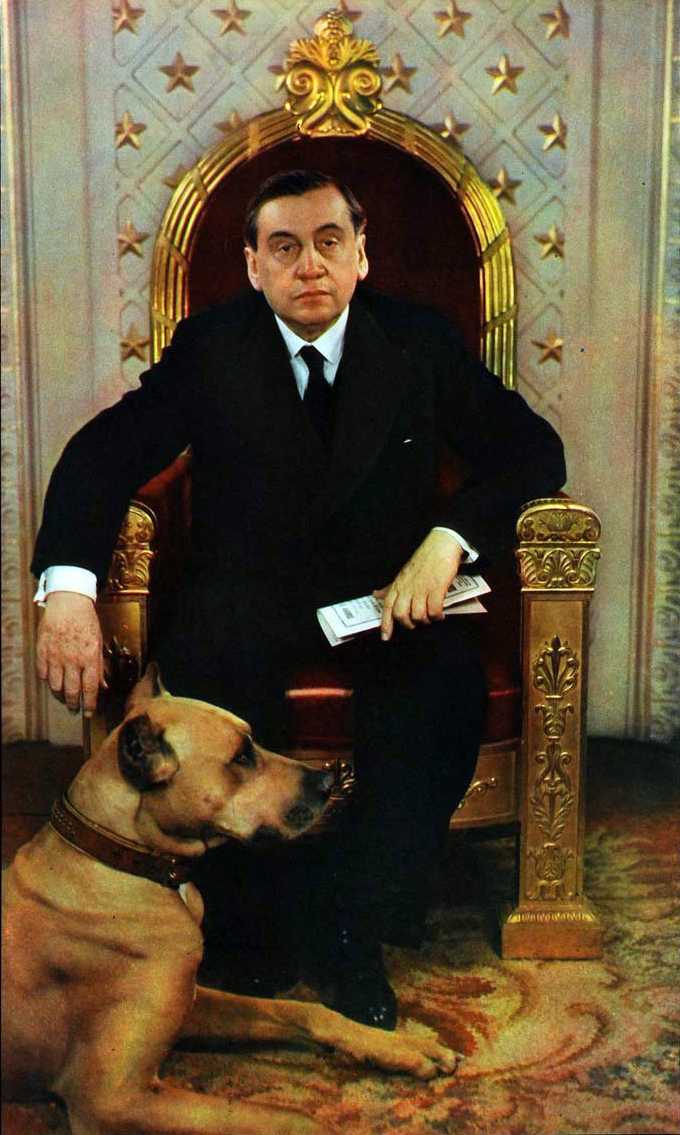
Arturo Alessandri

- August 3
  - Pierre-Émile Côté, Canadian politician (b. 1887)
  - Kristian Laake, Norwegian general (b. 1875)
- August 6 – Francisco José Urrutia Olano, Colombian diplomat and jurist (b. 1870)
- August 8 – Nikolai Myaskovsky, Soviet composer (b. 1881)
- August 10 – Tadeusz Tomaszewski, 34th Prime Minister of Poland (b. 1881)
- August 19
  - Black Elk, Wičháša Wakȟáŋ (Medicine Man or Holy Man) of the Ogala Teton Lakota (Western Sioux) (b. 1863)
  - Giovanni Giorgi, Italian physicist, engineer (b. 1871)
- August 22 – Kirk Bryan, American geologist (b. 1888)
- August 23 – Frank Phillips, American oil executive (b. 1873)
- August 24
  - Arturo Alessandri, Chilean politician, reformer and 3-time President of Chile (b. 1868)
  - Vasily Gordov, Soviet general (executed) (b. 1896)
  - Grigory Kulik, Soviet military officer, Marshal of the Soviet Union (executed) (b. 1890)
- August 25 – Giuseppe Grassi, Italian politician (b. 1883)
- August 26
  - Giuseppe De Luca, Italian baritone (b. 1876)
  - Ransom E. Olds, American automotive pioneer (b. 1864)
- August 27 – Cesare Pavese, Italian poet, novelist (b. 1908)
- August 31 – Pere Tarrés i Claret, Spanish Roman Catholic priest and blessed (b. 1905)

=== September ===
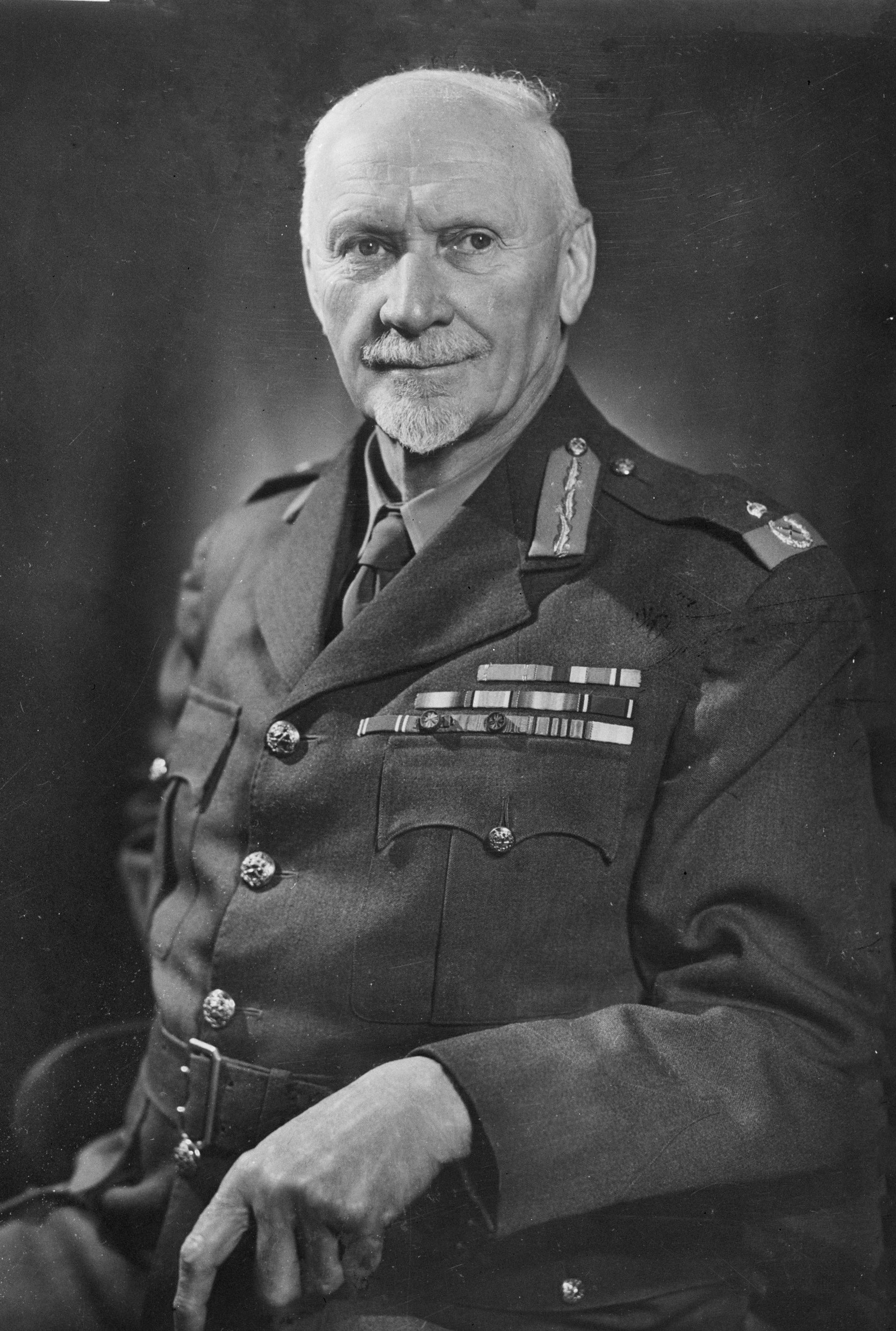
Jan Smuts

- September 4
  - Max Davidson, German actor (b. 1875)
  - Pieter Franciscus Dierckx, Belgian painter (b. 1871)
- September 6 – Olaf Stapledon, British author, philosopher (b. 1886)
- September 10 – Raymond Sommer, American race car driver (b. 1906)
- September 11
  - Rudolph Palm, Curaçao-born composer (b. 1880)
  - Jan Smuts, 2nd Prime Minister of South Africa (b. 1870)
- September 13 – Sara Allgood, Irish actress (b. 1880)
- September 15
  - Maraimalai Adigal, Indian orator, writer (b. 1876)
  - Baldomero López, American hero of Korean War (b. 1925)
- September 16
  - Frederick Bennett, New Zealand Anglican bishop and reverend (b. 1871)
  - Pedro de Cordoba, American actor (b. 1881)
- September 21 – Edward Arthur Milne, British astrophysicist, mathematician (b. 1896)
- September 23
  - George Carlton, American actor (b. 1885)
  - Kenneth Muir, British soldier, posthumous winner of the Victoria Cross (b.1912)
- September 29 – Alfréd Meissner, Czechoslovak politician, Holocaust survivor (b. 1871)
- September 30 – Prince Hubertus of Prussia (b. 1909)

=== October ===
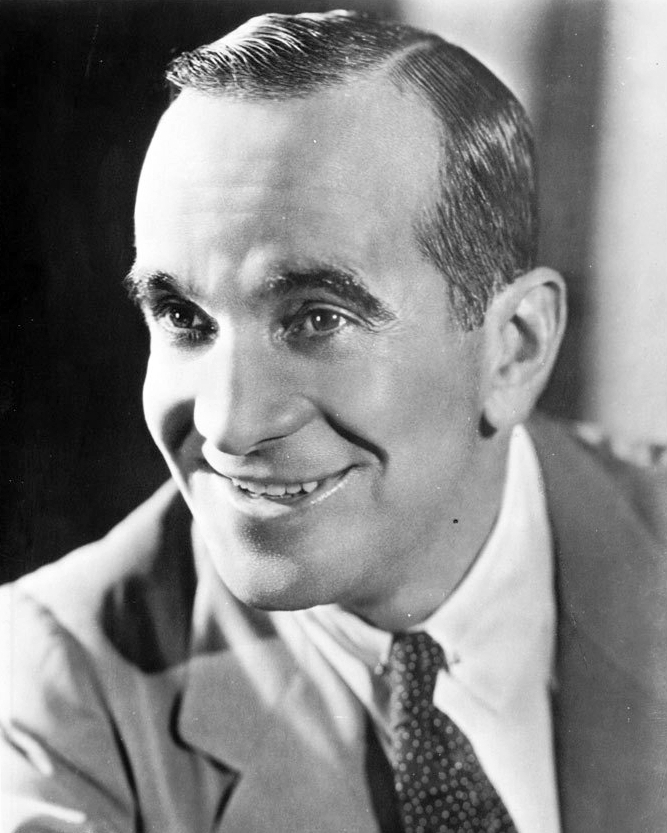
Al Jolson

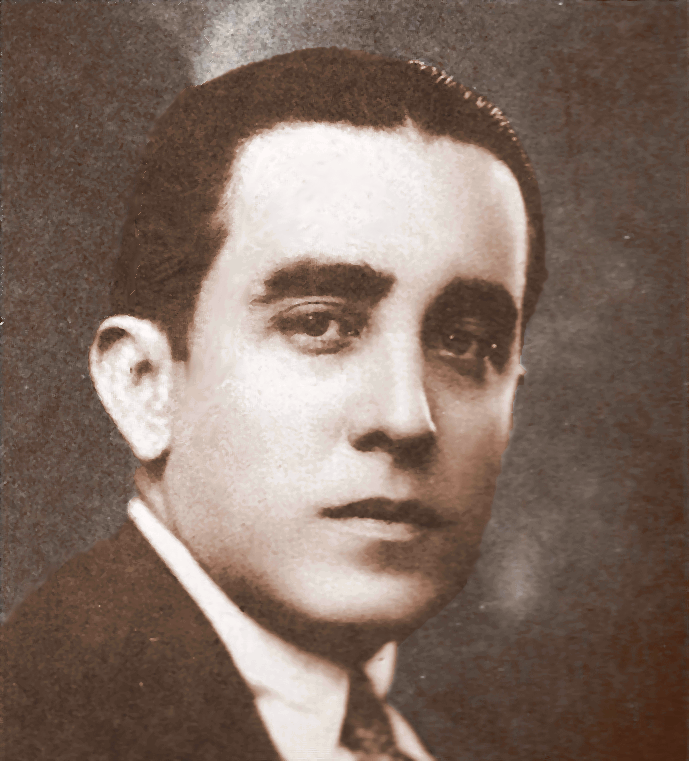
Miguel Mariano Gómez

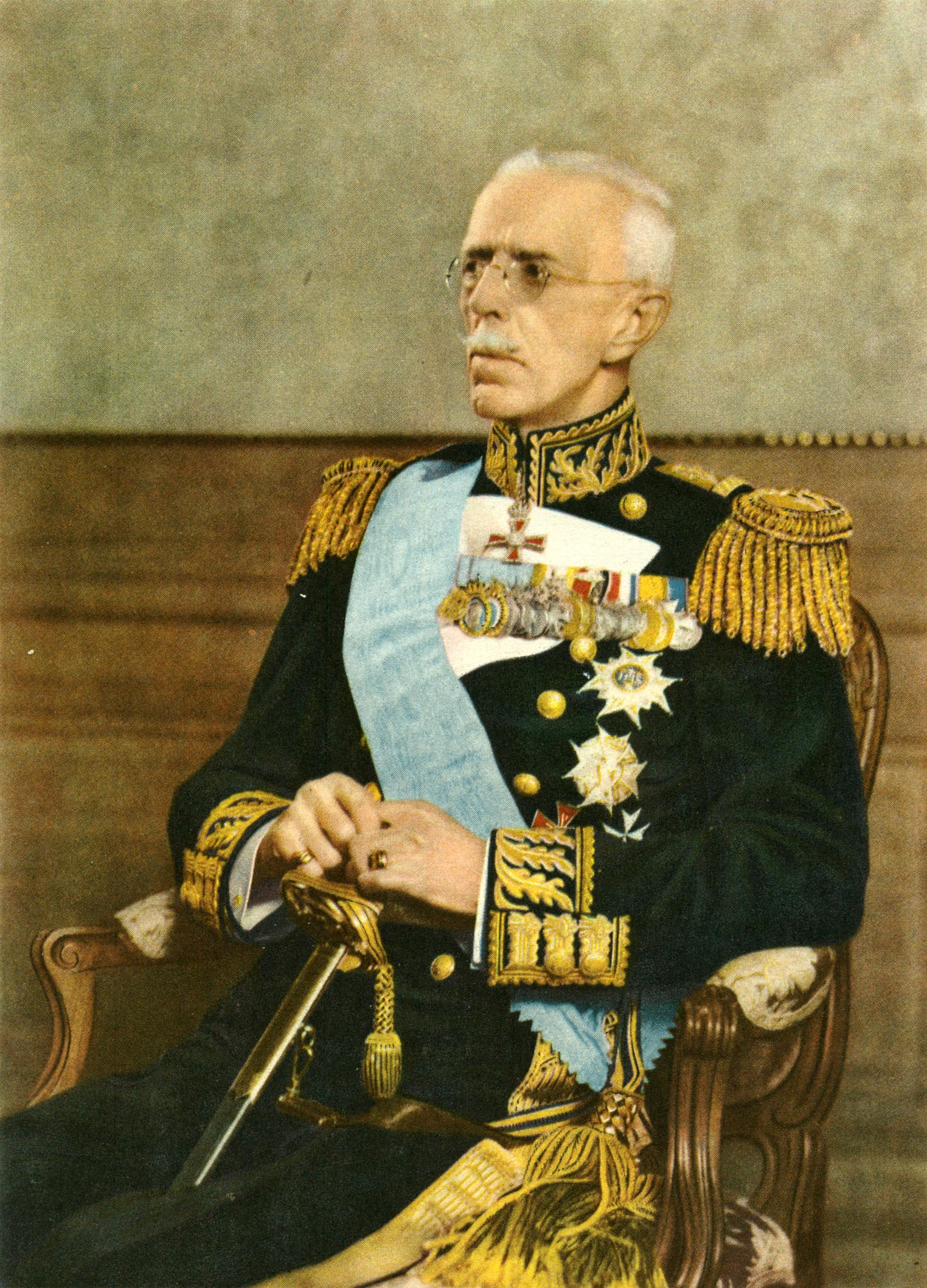
King Gustaf V of Sweden

- October 1 – Mikhail Rodionov, Soviet statesman, Leader of the Soviet Union (b. 1907)
- October 2 – John F. Fitzgerald, American politician, Mayor of Boston (b. 1863)
- October 5 – Thomas Addis Emmet, American-born Jamaican Roman Catholic bishop and reverend (b. 1873)
- October 9 – Nicolai Hartmann, German philosopher (b. 1882)
- October 11 – Pauline Lord, American actress (b. 1890)
- October 13 – Ernest Haycox, American writer (b. 1899)
- October 14 – António Maria da Silva, Portuguese politician, interim and 3-time Prime Minister of Portugal (b. 1872)
- October 18 – Giuseppe Borgatti, Italian tenor (b. 1871)
- October 19
  - Edna St. Vincent Millay, American poet (b. 1892)
  - Viktor Strazhev, Soviet bibliographer, translator, poet and literary critic (b. 1879)
- October 20 – Henry L. Stimson, United States Secretary of State (b. 1867)
- October 23 – Al Jolson, American musician, actor (The Jazz Singer) (b. 1886)
- October 25 – Yi Gwangsu, Korean writer, activist (b. 1891)
- October 26 – Miguel Mariano Gómez, Cuban politician, 7th President of Cuba (b. 1889)
- October 29
  - Maurice Costello, American actor (b. 1877)
  - King Gustaf V of Sweden (b. 1858)
  - Lucien Martin, Canadian violinist, conductor and composer (b. 1908)
- October 30 – Raimundo Díaz Pacheco, Puerto Rican activist (b. 1906)
- October 31 – Giacomo Gorrini, Italian diplomat (b. 1859)

=== November ===
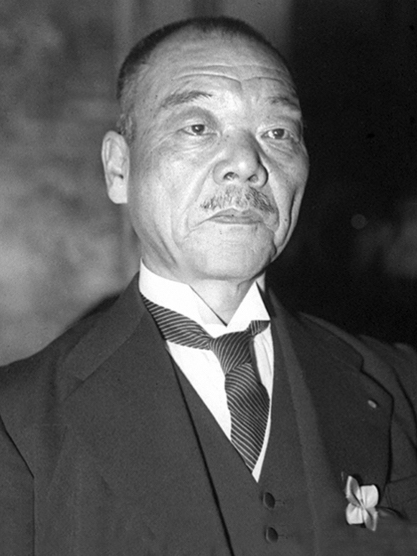
Kuniaki Koiso

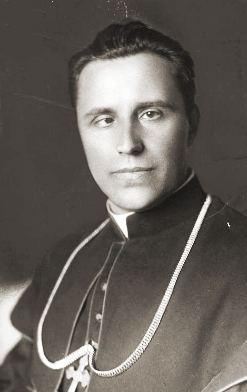
Hryhorij Lakota

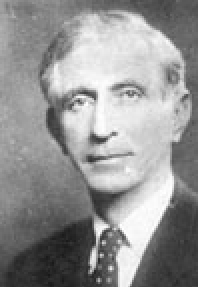
Abdul Hamid Karami

- November 2 – George Bernard Shaw, Irish writer, Nobel Prize laureate (b. 1856)
- November 3 – Kuniaki Koiso, Japanese general, 41st Prime Minister of Japan (b. 1880)
- November 4
  - Grover Cleveland Alexander, American baseball player (Philadelphia Phillies), MLB Hall of Fame member (b. 1887)
  - Francisca Herrera Garrido, Spanish writer (b. 1869)
- November 5 – Michael Strange, American poet (b, 1890)
- November 8 – Bernice Herstein, American socialite (b. 1918)
- November 9 – Attilio Andreoli, Italian painter (b. 1877)
- November 10 – Hanns Kräly, Oscar-winning German screenwriter (b. 1884)
- November 11
  - Alexandros Diomidis, 152nd Prime Minister of Greece (b. 1875)
  - Lúcio Alberto Pinheiro dos Santos, Portuguese philosopher, teacher (b. 1889)
- November 12
  - Hryhorij Lakota, Soviet Eastern Catholic bishop and blessed (b. 1883)
  - Julia Marlowe, English-born American stage actress (b. 1865)
- November 16 – Bob Smith, American doctor, physician and surgeon (b. 1879)
- November 17 – Virginia Fábregas, Mexican actress (b. 1871)
- November 23 – Abdul Hamid Karami, Lebanese political figure, religious leader and 16th Prime Minister of Lebanon (b. 1890)
- November 25
  - Johannes V. Jensen, Danish writer, Nobel Prize laureate (b. 1873)
  - Gustaf John Ramstedt, Finnish-born Swedish linguist, diplomat (b. 1873)
- November 27 – T. Sathasiva Iyer, Ceylon Tamil scholar, Tamil language writer (b. 1882)
- November 28 – James Corbitt, British murderer (hanged) (b. 1913)
- November 29 – Ma Zhanshan, Chinese general (b. 1885)
- November 30 – Werner Haase, Hitler's personal physician (b. 1900)

=== December ===
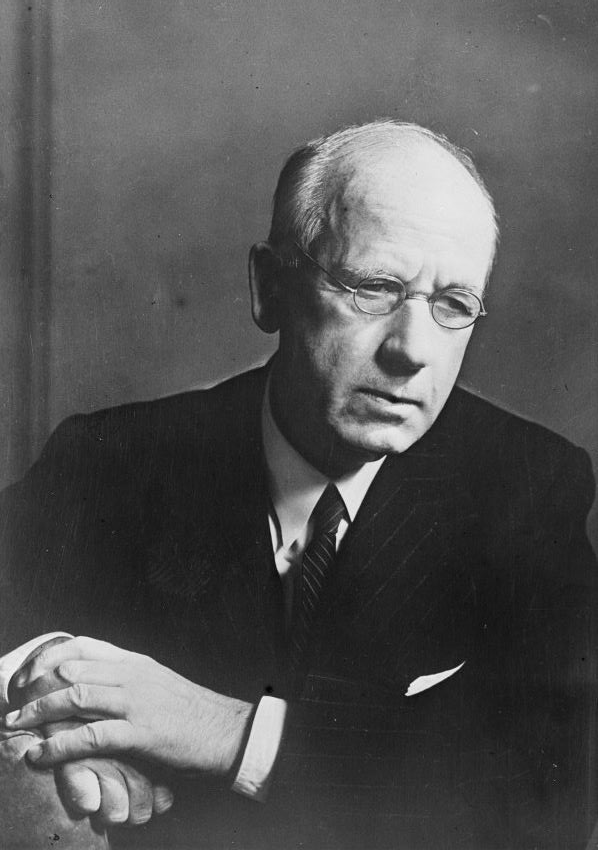
Peter Fraser

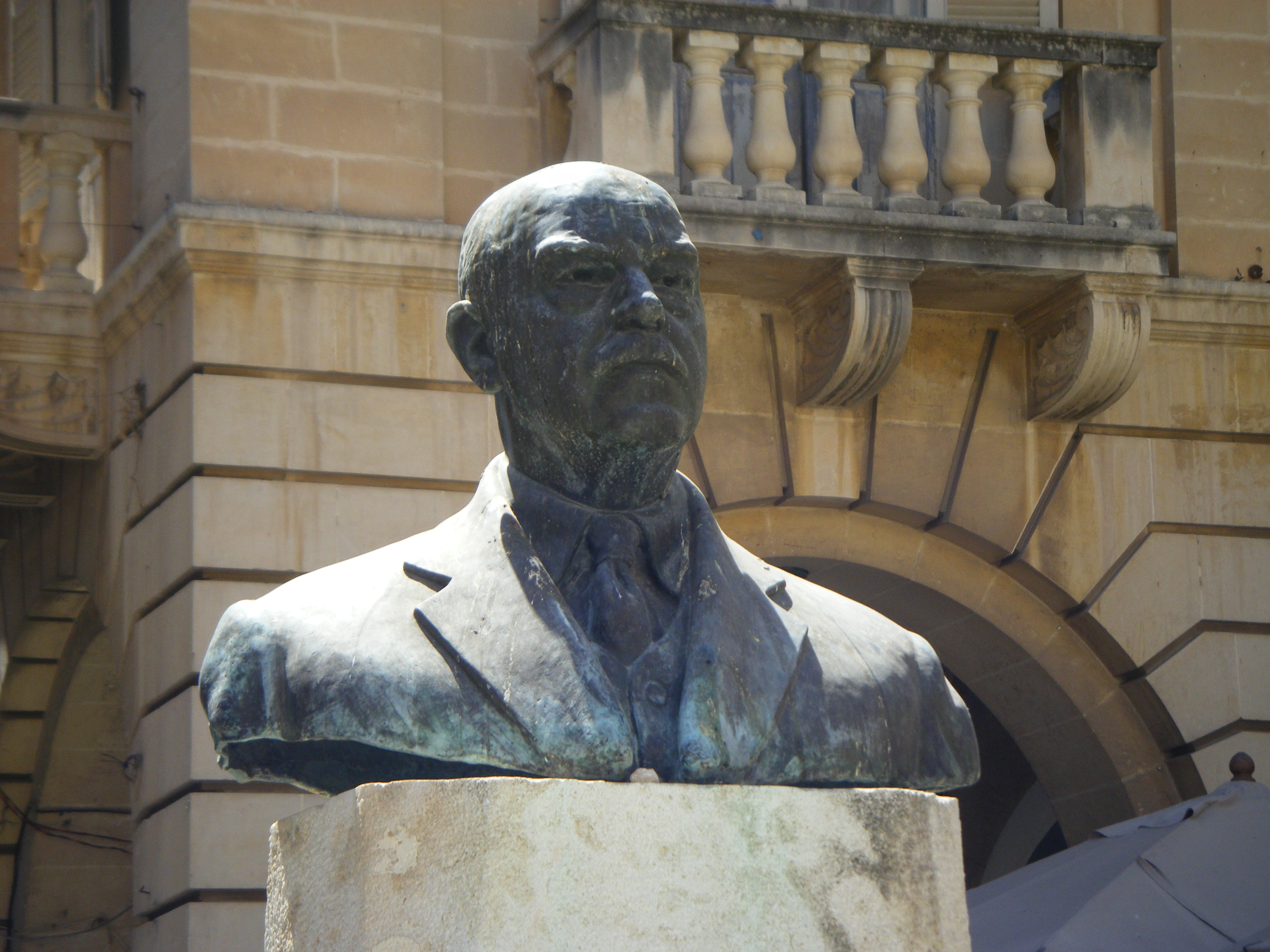
Enrico Mizzi

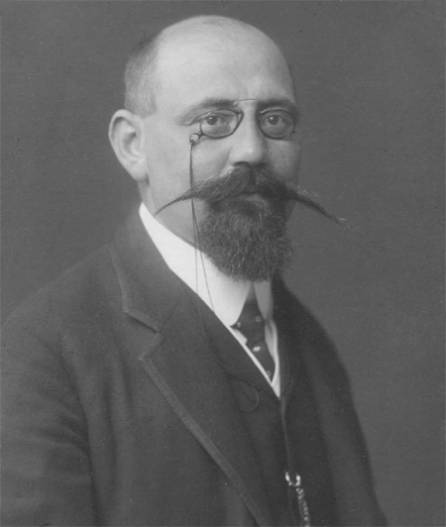
Karl Renner

- December 2
  - James Fenton, Australian politician (b. 1864)
  - Dinu Lipatti, Romanian pianist (b. 1917)
- December 4 – Jesse L. Brown, American aviator in the United States Navy (killed in action) (b. 1926)
- December 5 – Sri Aurobindo, Indian guru (b. 1872)
- December 11
  - Ernst II, Prince of Hohenlohe-Langenburg, German prince (b. 1863)
  - Leslie Comrie, New Zealand astronomer, computing pioneer (b. 1893)
- December 12
  - Luigi Biancheri, Italian admiral (b. 1891)
  - Peter Fraser, New Zealand political figure, 24th Prime Minister of New Zealand, leader of World War II (b. 1884)
- December 15 – Vallabhbhai Patel, Indian political leader (b. 1875)
- December 18 – Viliam Žingor, Slovak general and anti-fascist fighter (b. 1912)
- December 20 – Enrico Mizzi, Maltese politician, 6th Prime Minister of Malta (b. 1885)
- December 22 – Walter Damrosch, German-born American conductor and composer (b. 1862)
- December 23
  - Francisco Lomuto, Argentine pianist, composer (b. 1893)
  - Walton Walker, American general (b. 1889)
- December 25 – Xavier Villaurrutia, Mexican poet, playwright (b. 1903)
- December 26 – Liane de Pougy, French vedette and dancer (b. 1869)
- December 27 – Max Beckmann, German painter (b. 1884)
- December 30 – Mihail Manoilescu, Romanian journalist, engineer, economist, politician and memoirist (b. 1891)
- December 31 – Karl Renner, Austrian Social Democrat politician, 4th President of Austria (b. 1870)

== Nobel Prizes ==

- Physics – Cecil Frank Powell
- Chemistry – Otto Paul Hermann Diels, Kurt Alder
- Medicine – Edward Calvin Kendall, Tadeusz Reichstein, Philip Showalter Hench
- Literature – Earl (Bertrand Arthur William) Russell
- Peace – Ralph Bunche
