= List of mountain passes and hills in the Tour de France =

This is a list of mountain passes and hills in the Tour de France. Among the passes most often crossed, Col du Tourmalet, Col d'Aubisque, Col d'Aspin, Col de Peyresourde and Col du Galibier predominate, while the highest peak ever reached is Cime de la Bonette-Restefond (2,802 m (9,193 ft)), used in the 1962, 1964, 1993, 2008, and 2024 Tour de France.

The highest mountain finishes in the history of the Tour were Galibier (2,645 m (8,677 ft)) in 2011; previously this had been Val Thorens (2,275 m (7,464 ft)) in 1994; and before that Col du Granon (2,413 m (7,917 ft)) used in 1986 and 2022.

== Editions ==
=== 2001 ===
The 2001 Tour de France included 19 mountain passes or summit finishes, categorized HC, 1, or 2.

==== Stage 6 ====
- Category 2 – Col du Donon (727 m)

==== Stage 7 ====
- Category 2 – Col d'Adelspach (850 m)
- Category 2 – Col du Calvaire (1,135 m)

==== Stage 10 ====
- Category H – Col de la Madeleine (2,000 m)
- Category H – Col du Glandon (1,924 m)
- Category H – Alpe d'Huez (1,850 m)

==== Stage 11 ====
- Category H – Chamrousse (1,730 m)

==== Stage 12 ====
- Category 1 – Col de Jau (1,506 m)
- Category 2 – Col de Coudons (883 m)
- Category 1 – Ax-les-Thermes (1,375 m)

==== Stage 13 ====
- Category 2 – Col de Portet d'Aspet (1,069 m)
- Category 1 – Col de Menté (1,349 m)
- Category 1 – Col du Portillon (1,320 m)
- Category 1 – Col de Peyresourde (1,569 m)
- Category 1 – Col de Val Louron-Azet (1,580 m)
- Category H – Pla d'Adet (1,680 m)

==== Stage 14 ====
- Category 1 – Col d'Aspin (1,489 m)
- Category H – Col du Tourmalet (2,115 m)
- Category H – Luz Ardiden (1,715 m)

=== 2002 ===
The 2002 Tour de France included 21 mountain passes or summit finishes, categorized HC, 1, or 2.

==== Stage 11 ====
- Category H – Col d'Aubisque (1,709 m)
- Category 1 – La Mongie (1,715 m)

==== Stage 12 ====
- Category 1 – Col de Menté (1,350 m)
- Category 2 – Col de Portet d'Aspet (1,069 m)
- Category 1 – Col de la Core (1,395 m)
- Category 2 – Col de Port (1,249 m)
- Category H – Plateau de Beille (1,780 m)

==== Stage 14 ====
- Category H – Mont Ventoux (1,912 m)

==== Stage 15 ====
- Category 2 – Col de Grimone (1,318 m)
- Category 2 – Col d'Ornon (1,371 m)
- Category 1 – Les Deux Alpes (1,650 m)

==== Stage 16 ====
- Category H – Col du Galibier (2,645 m)
- Category H – Col de la Madeleine (2,000 m)
- Category H – La Plagne (1,880 m)

==== Stage 17 ====
- Category 1 – Cormet de Roselend (1,968 m)
- Category 1 – Col des Saisies (1,650 m)
- Category 2 – Col des Aravis (1,498 m)
- Category 1 – Col de la Colombière (1,618m)

==== Stage 18 ====
- Category 1 – Col de Richemond (1,060 m)
- Category 2 – Col du Berthiand (780 m)

=== 2003 ===
The 2003 Tour de France included 22 mountain passes or summit finishes, categorized HC, 1, or 2.

==== Stage 7 ====
- Category 2 – Col de Portes (1,020 m)
- Category 2 – Col du Mont des Princes (696 m)
- Category 1 – Col de la Ramaz (1,619 m)

==== Stage 8 ====
- Category 2 – Col du Télégraphe (1,566 m)
- Category H – Col du Galibier (2,645 m)
- Category H – Alpe d'Huez (1,850 m)

==== Stage 9 ====
- Category 1 – Col du Lautaret (2,058 m)
- Category H – Col d'Izoard (2,360m)
- Category 2 – Côte de Saint-Apollinaire (1,263 m)

==== Stage 13 ====
- Category 1 – Port de Pailhères (2,001 m)
- Category 1 – Ax 3 Domaines (1,372 m)

==== Stage 14 ====
- Category 2 – Col de Latrape (1,110 m)
- Category 1 – Col de la Core (1,395 m)
- Category 2 – Col de Portet d'Aspet (1,069 m)
- Category 1 – Col de Menté (1,349 m)
- Category 1 – Col du Portillon (1,320 m)
- Category 1 – Col de Peyresourde (1,563 m)

==== Stage 15 ====
- Category 1 – Col d'Aspin (1,489 m)
- Category H – Col du Tourmalet (2,114 m)
- Category H – Luz Ardiden (1,715 m)

==== Stage 16 ====
- Category 1 – Col du Soudet (1,540 m)
- Category 1 – Col Bagargui (1,327 m)

=== 2004 ===
The 2004 Tour de France included 22 mountain passes or summit finishes, categorized HC, 1, or 2.

==== Stage 10 ====
- Category 2 – Col de Néronne (1,242 m)
- Category 1 – Col du pas de Peyrol (1,589 m)
- Category 2 – Col de Prat-de-Bouc (1,392 m)

==== Stage 11 ====
- Category 2 – Côte de Montsalvy (725 m)

==== Stage 12 ====
- Category 1 – Col d'Aspin (1,489 m)
- Category 1 – La Mongie (1,715 m)

==== Stage 13 ====
- Category 2 – Col de Portet d'Aspet (1,069 m)
- Category 1 – Col de la Core (1,395 m)
- Category 2 – Col de Latrape (1,111 m)
- Category 1 – Col d'Agnes (1,570 m)
- Category H – Plateau de Beille (1,780 m)

==== Stage 15 ====
- Category 2 – Col des Limouches (1,075 m)
- Category 1 – Col de l'Écharasson (1,146 m)
- Category 2 – Col de Chalimont (1,374 m)
- Category 2 – Villard-de-Lans - Côte 2000 (1,150 m)

==== Stage 16 ====
- Category H – Alpe d'Huez (1,850 m)

==== Stage 17 ====
- Category 1 – Col du Glandon (1,924 m)
- Category H – Col de la Madeleine (2,001 m)
- Category 2 – Col de Tamié (907 m)
- Category 1 – Col de la Forclaz (1,157 m)
- Category 1 – Col de la Croix Fry (1,477 m)

==== Stage 18 ====
- Category 2 – Col de la Faucille (1,320 m)

=== 2005 ===
The 2005 Tour de France included 23 mountain passes or summit finishes, categorized HC, 1, or 2.

==== Stage 8 ====
- Category 2 – Col de la Schlucht (1,139 m)

==== Stage 9 ====
- Category 2 – Col du Grand Ballon (1,338 m)
- Category 1 – Col du Ballon d'Alsace (1,171 m)

==== Stage 10 ====
- Category 1 – Cormet de Roselend (1,968 m)
- Category 1 – Courchevel (2,004 m)

==== Stage 11 ====
- Category H – Col de la Madeleine (2,000 m)
- Category 1 – Col du Télégraphe (1,566 m)
- Category H – Col du Galibier (2,645 m)

==== Stage 12 ====
- Category 2 – Col Saint-Jean (1,332 m)
- Category 2 – Col du Corobin (1,230 m)

==== Stage 14 ====
- Category H – Port de Pailhères (2,001 m)
- Category 1 – Ax 3 Domaines (1,372 m)

==== Stage 15 ====
- Category 2 – Col de Portet d'Aspet (1,069 m)
- Category 1 – Col de Menté (1,349 m)
- Category 1 – Col du Portillon (1,320 m)
- Category 1 – Col de Peyresourde (1,569 m)
- Category 1 – Col de Val Louron-Azet (1,580 m)
- Category H – Saint-Lary Pla d'Adet (1,669 m)

==== Stage 16 ====
- Category 1 – Col de Marie-Blanque (1,035 m)
- Category H – Col d'Aubisque (1,677 m)

==== Stage 18 ====
- Category 2 – Côte de Boyne (930 m)
- Category 2 – Côte de la Croix Neuve (924 m)

==== Stage 19 ====
- Category 2 – Col des Pradeaux (1,196 m)

=== 2006 ===
The 2006 Tour de France included 22 mountain passes or summit finishes, categorized HC, 1, or 2.

==== Stage 10 ====
- Category H – Col du Soudet (1540 m)
- Category 1 – Col de Marie-Blanque (1035 m)

==== Stage 11 ====
- Category H – Col du Tourmalet (2115 m)
- Category 1 – Col d'Aspin (1489 m)
- Category 1 – Col de Peyresourde (1569 m)
- Category 1 – Col du Portillon (1293 m)
- Category 1 – Puerto de Beret (1830 m)

==== Stage 12 ====
- Category 2 – Col des Ares (797 m)

==== Stage 14 ====
- Category 2 – Col de Perty (1303 m)
- Category 2 – Col de la Sentinelle (981 m)

==== Stage 15 ====
- Category H – Col d'Izoard (2360 m)
- Category 2 – Col du Lautaret (2058 m)
- Category H – Alpe d'Huez (1850 m)

==== Stage 16 ====
- Category H – Col du Galibier (2645 m)
- Category H – Col de la Croix de Fer (2067 m)
- Category 2 – Col du Mollard (1638 m)
- Category 1 – La Toussuire (1705 m)

==== Stage 17 ====
- Category 1 – Col des Saisies (1650 m)
- Category 2 – Col des Aravis (1486 m)
- Category 1 – Col de la Colombière (1613 m)
- Category H – Col de Joux-Plane (1691 m)

==== Stage 18 ====
- Category 2 – Col du Berthiand (780 m)

=== 2007 ===
The 2007 Tour de France included 22 mountain passes or summit finishes, categorized HC, 1, or 2.

In 2007, the Tour had a stage finish at the summit of Col d'Aubisque (1,709 m (5,607 ft)) for the first time.

==== Stage 5 ====
- Category 2 – Haut-Folin (867 m)

==== Stage 7 ====
- Category 1 – Col de la Colombière (1618 m)

==== Stage 8 ====
- Category 2 – Col de Tamié (907 m)
- Category 1 – Cormet de Roselend (1967 m)
- Category 1 – Montée d'Hauteville (1639 m)
- Category 1 – Montée de Tignes (2068 m)

==== Stage 9 ====
- Category H – Col de l'Iseran (2770 m)
- Category 1 – Col du Télégraphe (1566 m)
- Category H – Col du Galibier (2645 m)

==== Stage 12 ====
- Category 2 – Montée de la Jeante (958 m)

==== Stage 14 ====
- Category 2 – Côte de Saint-Saraille (810 m)
- Category H – Port de Pailhères (2001 m)
- Category H – Plateau de Beille (1780 m)

==== Stage 15 ====
- Category 2 – Col de Port (1249 m)
- Category 2 – Col de Portet d'Aspet (1069 m)
- Category 1 – Col de Menté (1349 m)
- Category H – Port de Balès (1755 m)
- Category 1 – Col de Peyresourde (1569 m)

==== Stage 16 ====
- Category H – Port de Larrau (1573 m)
- Category 1 – Col de la Pierre St Martin (1760 m)
- Category 1 – Col de Marie-Blanque (1035 m)
- Category H – Col d'Aubisque (1709 m)

=== 2008 ===
The 2008 Tour de France included 17 mountain passes or summit finishes, categorized HC, 1, or 2.

==== Stage 6 ====
- Category 2 – Col de la Croix-Morand (1401 m)
- Category 2 – Super Besse (1289 m)

==== Stage 7 ====
- Category 2 – Col d'Entremont (1210 m)
- Category 2 – Pas de Peyrol (Puy Mary) (1588 m)

==== Stage 9 ====
- Category 1 – Col de Peyresourde (1569 m)
- Category 1 – Col d'Aspin (1489 m)

==== Stage 10 ====
- Category H – Col du Tourmalet (2115 m)
- Category H – Hautacam (1520 m)

==== Stage 11 ====
- Category 1 – Col de Portel (1432 m)

==== Stage 15 ====
- Category H – Col Agnel (2744 m)
- Category 1 – Prato Nevoso (1440 m)

==== Stage 16 ====
- Category H – Col de la Lombarde (2351 m)
- Category H – Cime de la Bonette-Restefond (2802 m)

==== Stage 17 ====
- Category H – Col du Galibier (2645 m)
- Category H – Col de la Croix de Fer (2067 m)
- Category H – Alpe d'Huez (1850 m)

==== Stage 18 ====
- Category 2 – La Croix de Montvieux (811 m)

=== 2009 ===
The 2009 Tour de France included 21 mountain passes or summit finishes, categorized HC, 1, or 2. Seven of them were situated in the Pyrenees, three in the Vosges, nine in the Alps, one in the Ardèche and one in the Pre-Alps:

==== Stage 7 ====
- Category 1 – Col de Serra-Seca (1160 m)
- Category H – Andorre Arcalis (2240 m)

==== Stage 8 ====
- Category 1 – Port d'Envalira (2408 m)
- Category 2 – Col de Port (1250 m)
- Category 1 – Col d'Agnes (1570 m)

==== Stage 9 ====
- Category 1 – Col d'Aspin (1490 m)
- Category H – Col du Tourmalet (2115 m)

==== Stage 13 ====
- Category 2 – Col de la Schlucht (1139 m)
- Category 1 – Col du Platzerwasel (1193 m)
- Category 2 – Col du Firstplan (722 m)

==== Stage 15 ====
- Category 2 – Col des Mosses (1445 m)
- Category 1 – Verbier (1468 m)

==== Stage 16 ====
- Category H – Col du Grand-Saint-Bernard (2473 m)
- Category 1 – Col du Petit-Saint-Bernard (2188 m)

==== Stage 17 ====
- Category 1 – Cormet de Roselend (1968 m)
- Category 1 – Col des Saisies (1650 m)
- Category 2 – Côte d'Araches (964 m)
- Category 1 – Col de Romme (1297 m)
- Category 1 – Col de la Colombière (1618 m)

==== Stage 19 ====
- Category 2 – Col de l'Escrinet (787 m)

==== Stage 20 ====
- Category H – Mont Ventoux (1912 m)

=== 2010 ===
The 2010 Tour de France included 23 mountain passes or summit finishes, categorized HC, 1, or 2. One of them were situated in the Jura, eight in the Alps, two in the Cévennes, and twelve in the Pyrenees:

==== Stage 7 ====
- Category 2 – Côte du Barrage de Vouglans (710 m)
- Category 2 – Col de la Croix de la Serra (1049 m)
- Category 2 – Côte de Lamoura (1145 m)

==== Stage 8 ====
- Category 1 – Col de la Ramaz (1619 m)
- Category 1 – Morzine-Avoriaz (1796 m)

==== Stage 9 ====
- Category 1 – Col de la Colombière (1618 m)
- Category 2 – Col des Aravis (1487 m)
- Category 1 – Col des Saisies (1660 m)
- Category H – Col de la Madeleine (2000 m)

==== Stage 10 ====
- Category 1 – Côte de Laffrey (886 m)
- Category 2 – Col du Noyer (1664 m)

==== Stage 12 ====
- Category 2 – Suc de Montivernoux (1315 m)
- Category 2 – Côte de la Croix Neuve (Montée Laurent Jalabert) (1047 m)

==== Stage 14 ====
- Category H – Port de Pailhères (2001 m)
- Category 1 – Ax 3-Domaines (1372 m)

==== Stage 15 ====
- Category 2 – Col de Portet d'Aspet (1069 m)
- Category 2 – Col des Ares (797 m)
- Category H – Port de Balès (1755 m)

==== Stage 16 ====
- Category 1 – Col de Peyresourde (1569 m)
- Category 1 – Col d'Aspin (1490 m)
- Category H – Col du Tourmalet (2115 m)
- Category H – Col d'Aubisque (1709 m)

==== Stage 17 ====
- Category 1 – Col de Marie-Blanque (1035 m)
- Category 1 – Col du Soulor (1474 m)
- Category H – Col du Tourmalet (Souvenir Henri Desgrange) (2115 m)

=== 2011 ===
The 2011 Tour de France included 23 mountain passes or summit finishes, categorized HC, 1, or 2. Four of them are situated in the Massif Central, nine in the Pyrenees, and ten in the Alps:

==== Stage 8 ====
- Category 2 – Col de la Croix Saint-Robert (1451 m)

==== Stage 9 ====
- Category 2 – Pas de Peyrol (Puy Mary) (1589 m)
- Category 2 – Col du Perthus (1309 m)
- Category 2 – Col de Prat-de-Bouc (Plomb du Cantal) (1392 m)

==== Stage 12 ====
- Category 1 – La Hourquette d'Ancizan (1538 m)
- Category H – Col du Tourmalet (2115 m)
- Category H – Luz-Ardiden (1715 m)

==== Stage 13 ====
- Category H – Col d'Aubisque (1709 m)

==== Stage 14 ====
- Category 2 – Col de Portet d'Aspet (1069 m)
- Category 1 – Col de la Core (1395 m)
- Category 2 – Col de Latrape (1110 m)
- Category 1 – Col d'Agnes (1570 m)
- Category H – Plateau de Beille (1780 m)

==== Stage 16 ====
- Category 2 – Col de Manse (1268 m)

==== Stage 17 ====
- Category 2 – Col de Montgenèvre (1860 m)
- Category 1 – Sestrières (2035 m)
- Category 2 – Côte de Pramartino (912 m)

==== Stage 18 ====
- Category H – Col Agnel (2744 m)
- Category H – Col d'Izoard (2360 m)
- Category H – Galibier (Serre Chevalier) (2645 m)

==== Stage 19 ====
- Category 1 – Col du Télégraphe (1566 m)
- Category H – Col du Galibier (2556 m)
- Category H – Alpe d'Huez (1850 m)

=== 2012 ===
The 2012 tour included three uphill finishes: La Planche des Belles Filles (stage 7), La Toussuire - Les Sybelles (stage 11) and Peyragudes (stage 17). The Col du Grand Colombier was included for the first time, and was among six Hors catégorie rated climbs in the Alps and Pyrenees.

==== Stage 7 ====
- Category 1 – La Planche des Belles Filles (1035 m)

==== Stage 8 ====
- Category 2 – Côte de Maison-Rouge (784 m)
- Category 2 – Côte de Saignelégier (979 m)
- Category 2 – Côte de Saulcy (928 m)
- Category 2 – Côte de la Caquerelle (834 m)
- Category 1 – Col de la Croix (789 m)

==== Stage 10 ====
- Category 2 – Côte de Corlier (762 m)
- Category H – Col du Grand Colombier (1501 m)

==== Stage 11 ====
- Category H – Col de la Madeleine (1993 m)
- Category H – Col de la Croix de Fer (2067 m)
- Category 2 – Col du Mollard (1638 m)
- Category 1 – Les Sybelles (1705 m)

==== Stage 12 ====
- Category 1 – Col du Grand Cucheron (1188 m)
- Category 1 – Col du Granier (1134 m)

==== Stage 14 ====
- Category 2 – Col du Portel (601 m)
- Category 1 – Port de Lers (1517 m)
- Category 1 – Mur de Péguère (1375 m)

==== Stage 16 ====
- Category H – Col d'Aubisque (1709 m)
- Category H – Col du Tourmalet (2115 m)
- Category 1 – Col d'Aspin (1489 m)
- Category 1 – Col de Peyresourde (1559 m)

==== Stage 17 ====
- Category 1 – Col de Menté (1349 m)
- Category 2 – Col des Ares (797 m)
- Category H – Port de Balès (1755 m)
- Category 1 – Peyragudes (1603 m)

=== 2013 ===
The 2013 Tour de France included 28 climbs ranked Category 2 or higher of which seven were Hors catégorie climbs, eight Category 1 and thirteen were Second Category. There were four "mountain top" finishes: at Ax 3 Domaines in the Pyrenees, Mont Ventoux in Provence, and Alpe d'Huez and Annecy-Semnoz in the Alps. Alpe d'Huez was used twice on stage 18, both times ranked Hors catégorie.

==== Stage 2 ====
- Category 2 – Col de Vizzavona (1163 m)

==== Stage 3 ====
- Category 2 – Col de Marsolino (443 m)

==== Stage 7 ====
- Category 2 – Col de la Croix de Mounis (809 m)

==== Stage 8 ====
- Category H – Port de Pailhères (2001 m) (Souvenir Henri Desgrange)
- Category 1 – Ax 3 Domaines (1350 m)

==== Stage 9 ====
- Category 2 – Col de Portet d'Aspet (1069 m)
- Category 1 – Col de Menté (1349 m)
- Category 1 – Col de Peyresourde (1569 m)
- Category 1 – Col de Val Louron-Azet (1580 m)
- Category 1 – La Hourquette d'Ancizan (1564 m)

==== Stage 15 ====
- Category H – Mont Ventoux (1912 m)

==== Stage 16 ====
- Category 2 – Col de Macuègne (1068 m)
- Category 2 – Col de Manse (1268 m)

==== Stage 17 ====
- Category 2 – Côte de Puy-Sanières (1173 m)
- Category 2 – Côte de Réallon (1227 m)

==== Stage 18 ====
- Category 2 – Col de Manse (1268 m)
- Category 2 – Col d'Ornon (1371 m)
- Category H – Alpe d'Huez (1765 m)
- Category 2 – Col de Sarenne (1999 m)
- Category H – Alpe d'Huez (1850 m)

==== Stage 19 ====
- Category H – Col du Glandon (1924 m)
- Category H – Col de la Madeleine (2000 m)
- Category 2 – Col de Tamié (907 m)
- Category 1 – Col de l'Épine (947 m)
- Category 1 – Col de la Croix Fry (1477 m)

==== Stage 20 ====
- Category 2 – Côte du Puget (796 m)
- Category 1 – Mont Revard (1463 m)
- Category H – Annecy-Semnoz (1655 m)

=== 2014 ===
The 2014 Tour de France includes 25 climbs ranked Category 2 or higher of which six are Hors catégorie climbs, eleven Category 1 and eight are Second Category. There are seven "mountain top" finishes: at La Mauselaine (Category 3) and La Planche des Belles Filles in the Vosges, Chamrousse and Risoul in the Alps, and Saint-Lary Pla d'Adet and Hautacam in the Pyrenees.

==== Stage 2 ====
- Category 2 – Côte de Holme Moss (521 m)

==== Stage 8 ====
- Category 2 – Col de la Croix des Moinats (885 m)
- Category 2 – Col de Grosse Pierre (901 m)

==== Stage 9 ====
- Category 2 – Col de la Schlucht (1140 m)
- Category 2 – Côte de Gueberschwihr (559 m)
- Category 1 – Le Markstein (1183 m)

==== Stage 10 ====
- Category 2 – Col du Firstplan (722 m)
- Category 1 – Petit Ballon (1163 m)
- Category 1 – Col du Platzerwasel (1182 m)
- Category 2 – Col d'Oderen (884 m)
- Category 1 – Col des Chevrères (914 m)
- Category 1 – La Planche des Belles Filles (1035 m)

==== Stage 13 ====
- Category 1 – Col de Palaquit (1154 m)
- Category H – Chamrousse (1730 m)

==== Stage 14 ====
- Category 1 – Col du Lautaret (2058 m)
- Category H – Col d'Izoard (2360 m)
- Category 1 – Risoul (1855 m)

==== Stage 16 ====
- Category 2 – Col de Portet d'Aspet (1069 m)
- Category H – Port de Balès (1755 m)

==== Stage 17 ====
- Category 1 – Col du Portillon (1292 m)
- Category 1 – Col de Peyresourde (1569 m)
- Category 1 – Col de Val Louron-Azet (1580 m)
- Category H – Saint-Lary Pla d'Adet (1680 m)

==== Stage 18 ====
- Category H – Col du Tourmalet (2115 m)
- Category H – Hautacam (1520 m)

=== 2015 ===
The 2015 Tour de France includes 25 climbs ranked Category 2 or higher of which 7 are Hors catégorie climbs, 6 Category 1 and 12 are Second Category.

==== Stage 10 ====
- Category H – Col de la Pierre St Martin (1610 m)

==== Stage 11 ====
- Category 1 – Col d'Aspin (1490 m)
- Category H – Col du Tourmalet (2115 m)

==== Stage 12 ====
- Category 2 – Col de Portet d'Aspet (1069 m)
- Category 1 – Col de la Core (1395 m)
- Category 1 – Port de Lers (1517 m)
- Category H – Plateau de Beille (1780 m)

==== Stage 14 ====
- Category 2 – Côte de Sauveterre (1014 m)
- Category 2 – Côte de la Croix Neuve (Montée Laurent Jalabert) (1055 m)

==== Stage 15 ====
- Category 2 – Col de l'Escrinet (787 m)

==== Stage 16 ====
- Category 2 – Col de Cabre (1180 m)
- Category 2 – Col de Manse (1268 m)

==== Stage 17 ====
- Category 2 – Col de la Colle (1431 m)
- Category 1 – Col d'Allos (2250 m)
- Category 2 – Pra-Loup (1620 m)

==== Stage 18 ====
- Category 2 – Col Bayard (1264 m)
- Category 2 – Col de la Morte (1368 m)
- Category H – Col du Glandon (1924 m)
- Category 2 – Lacets de Montvernier (782 m)

==== Stage 19 ====
- Category 1 – Col du Chaussy (1533 m)
- Category H – Col de la Croix de Fer (2067 m)
- Category 2 – Col du Mollard (1638 m)
- Category 1 – La Toussuire (1705 m)

==== Stage 20 ====
- Category H – Col de la Croix de Fer (2067 m)
- Category H – Alpe d'Huez (1850 m)

=== 2016 ===
The 2016 Tour de France includes 28 mountain passes or summit finishes, categorized HC, 1, or 2.

==== Stage 5 ====
- Category 2 – Pas de Peyrol (1,589 m)
- Category 2 – Col du Perthus (1,309 m)

==== Stage 7 ====
- Category 1 – Col d'Aspin (1,489 m)

==== Stage 8 ====
- Category H – Col du Tourmalet (2,115 m)
- Category 1 – La Hourquette d'Ancizan (1,564 m)
- Category 1 – Col de Val Louron-Azet (1,580 m)
- Category 1 – Col de Peyresourde (1,569 m)

==== Stage 9 ====
- Category 1 – Port de la Bonaigua (2,072 m)
- Category 1 – Port del Cantó (1,721 m)
- Category 2 – Côte de la Comella (1,347 m)
- Category 1 – Col de Beixalis (1,796 m)
- Category H – Andorre Arcalis (2,240 m)

==== Stage 10 ====
- Category 1 – Port d'Envalira (2,408 m)

==== Stage 12 ====
- Category H – Mont Ventoux (1,912 m)

==== Stage 15 ====
- Category 2 – Col du Berthiand (780 m)
- Category 2 – Col du Sappel (794 m)
- Category H – Col du Grand Colombier (1,501 m)
- Category 2 – Lacets du Grand Colombier (891 m)

==== Stage 17 ====
- Category 1 – Col de la Forclaz (1,527 m)
- Category H – Finhaut - Émosson (1,929 m)

==== Stage 19 ====
- Category 1 – Col de la Forclaz de Montmin (1,157m)
- Category 2 – Col de la Forclaz de Queige (870 m)
- Category H – Montée de Bisanne (1,723 m)
- Category 1 – Saint–Gervais Mont Blanc (1,372 m)

==== Stage 20 ====
- Category 2 – Col des Aravis (1,487 m)
- Category 1 – Col de la Colombière (1,613 m)
- Category 1 – Col de la Ramaz (1,619 m)
- Category H – Col de Joux Plane (1,691 m)

=== 2017 ===
The 2017 Tour de France includes 28 mountain passes or summit finishes, categorized HC, 1, or 2.

==== Stage 5 ====
- Category 1 – La Planche des Belles Filles (1035 m)

==== Stage 8 ====
- Category 2 – Côte de Viry (748 m)
- Category 1 – Montée de la Combe de Laisia Les Molunes (1,202 m)

==== Stage 9 ====
- Category 2 – Côte des Neyrolles (825 m)
- Category H – Col de la Biche (1,316 m)
- Category H – Grand Colombier (1,501 m)
- Category H – Mont du Chat (1,504 m)

==== Stage 12 ====
- Category 2 – Col des Ares (797 m)
- Category 1 – Col de Menté (1,349 m)
- Category H – Port de Balès (1,755 m)
- Category 1 – Col de Peyresourde (1,569 m)
- Category 2 – Peyragudes (1,580 m)

==== Stage 13 ====
- Category 2 – Col de Latrape (1,110 m)
- Category 1 – Col d'Agnes (1,570 m)
- Category 1 – Mur de Péguère (1,375 m)

==== Stage 15 ====
- Category 1 – Montée de Naves d'Aubrac (1,058 m)
- Category 1 – Col de Peyra Taillade (1,190 m)

==== Stage 17 ====
- Category 2 – Col d'Ornon (1,371 m)
- Category H – Col de la Croix de Fer (2,067 m)
- Category 1 – Col du Télégraphe (1,566 m)
- Category H – Col du Galibier (2,642 m)

==== Stage 18 ====
- Category 1 – Col de Vars (2,109 m)
- Category H – Col d'Izoard (2,360 m)

=== 2018 ===
The 2018 Tour de France includes 26 mountain passes or summit finishes, categorized HC, 1, or 2.

==== Stage 10 ====
- Category 1 – Col de la Croix Fry (1,477 m)
- Category H – Montée du Plateau des Gilères (1,390 m)
- Category 1 – Col de Romme (1,297 m)
- Category 1 – Col de la Colombière (1,618 m)

==== Stage 11 ====
- Category H – Montée de Bisanne (1,723 m)
- Category H – Col du Pré (1,748 m)
- Category 2 – Cormet de Roselend (1,968 m)
- Category 1 – La Rosière (1,855 m)

==== Stage 12 ====
- Category H – Col de la Madeleine (2,000 m)
- Category 2 – Lacets de Montvernier (782 m)
- Category H – Col de la Croix de Fer (2,067 m)
- Category H – Alpe d'Huez (1,850 m)

==== Stage 14 ====
- Category 2 – Col de la Croix-de-Berthel (1,088 m)
- Category 2 – Côte de la Croix Neuve (1,055 m)

==== Stage 15 ====
- Category 2 – Col de Slé (928 m)
- Category 1 – Pic de Nore (1,205 m)

==== Stage 16 ====
- Category 2 – Col de Portet d'Aspet (1,069 m)
- Category 1 – Col de Menté (1,349 m)
- Category 1 – Col du Portillon (1,292 m)

==== Stage 17 ====
- Category 1 – Peyragudes (1,645 m)
- Category 1 – Col de Val Louron-Azet (1,580 m)
- Category H – Col de Portet (2,215 m)

==== Stage 19 ====
- Category 1 – Col d'Aspin (1,490 m)
- Category H – Col du Tourmalet (2,115 m)
- Category 2 – Col des Bordères (1,156 m)
- Category H – Col d'Aubisque (1,709 m)

=== 2019 ===
The 2019 Tour de France includes 27 mountain passes or summit finishes, categorized HC, 1, or 2.

==== Stage 5 ====
- Category 2 – Cote du Haut-Koeninsburg (554 m)
- Category 2 – Col des Trois-epis (659 m)

==== Stage 6 ====
- Category 1 – Le Markstein (1,183 m)
- Category 2 – Col du Hunsdruck (748 m)
- Category 1 – Ballon d'Alsace (1,173 m)
- Category 1 – Col des Chevrères (914 m)
- Category 1 – La Planche des Belles Filles (1,140 m)

==== Stage 8 ====
- Category 2 – Col de la Croix Montmain (737 m)
- Category 2 – Col de la Croix de Thel (650 m)
- Category 2 – Col de la Croix Paquet (598 m)
- Category 2 – Col de la Croix de Part (738 m)
- Category 2 – Cote d'Aveize (778 m)

==== Stage 9 ====
- Category 1 – Mur d'Aurec-sur-Loire (802 m)

==== Stage 12 ====
- Category 1 – Col de Peyresourde (1,569 m)
- Category 1 – La Hourquette d'Ancizan (1,564 m)

==== Stage 14 ====
- Category 1 – Col du Soulor (1,474 m)
- Category H – Col du Tourmalet (2,115 m)

==== Stage 15 ====
- Category 2 – Col de Montségur (1,059 m)
- Category 1 – Port de Lers (1,517 m)
- Category 1 – Col de Péguère (1,375 m)
- Category 1 – Prat d'Albis (1,205 m)

==== Stage 18 ====
- Category 1 – Col de Vars (2,109 m)
- Category H – Col d'Izoard (2,360 m)
- Category H – Col du Galibier (2,642 m)

==== Stage 19 ====
- Category 2 – Montée d'Aussois (1,467 m)
- Category H – Col de l'Iseran (2,770 m)

==== Stage 20 ====
- Category H – Val Thorens (2,365 m)

=== 2020 ===
The 2020 Tour de France includes 29 mountain passes or summit finishes, categorized HC, 1, or 2.

==== Stage 2 ====
- Category 1 – Col de la Colmiane (1,500 m)
- Category 1 – Col de Turini (1,607 m)
- Category 2 – Col d'Èze (490 m)

==== Stage 4 ====
- Category 1 – Orcières-Merlette (1,825 m)

==== Stage 6 ====
- Category 1 – Col de la Lusette (1,351 m)

==== Stage 8 ====
- Category 1 – Col de Menté (1,349 m)
- Category H – Port de Balès (1,755 m)
- Category 1 – Col de Peyresourde (1,569 m)

==== Stage 9 ====
- Category 1 – Col de la Hourcère (1,440 m)
- Category 1 – Col de Marie-Blanque (1,035 m)

==== Stage 12 ====
- Category 2 – Suc au May (903 m)

==== Stage 13 ====
- Category 1 – Col de Ceyssat (1,078 m)
- Category 2 – Montée de la Stèle (1,250 m)
- Category 2 – Col de Néronne (1,242 m)
- Category 1 – Pas de Peyrol (1,589 m)

==== Stage 14 ====
- Category 2 – Col du Béal (1,390 m)

==== Stage 15 ====
- Category 1 – Montèe de la Selle de Fromentel (1,174 m)
- Category 1 – Col de la Biche (1,325 m)
- Category H – Grand Colombier (1,501 m)

==== Stage 16 ====
- Category 2 – Col de Porte (1,326 m)
- Category 2 – Côte de Revel (752 m)
- Category 1 – Montée de Saint Nizier du Moucherotte (1,169 m)

==== Stage 17 ====
- Category H – Col de la Madeleine (2,000 m)
- Category H – Col de la Loze (2,304 m)

==== Stage 18 ====
- Category 1 – Cormet de Roselend (1,968 m)
- Category 2 – Col des Saisies (1,624 m)
- Category 1 – Col des Aravis (1,487 m)
- Category H – Montée du Plateau des Gilères (1,390 m)

==== Stage 20 ====
- Category 1 – La Planche des Belles Filles (1,035 m)

=== 2021 ===
The 2021 Tour de France includes 27 mountain passes or summit finishes, categorized HC, 1, or 2.

==== Stage 7 ====
- Category 2 – Signal d'Uchon (633 m)

==== Stage 8 ====
- Category 1 – Côte de Mont-Saxonnex (957 m)
- Category 1 – Col de Romme (1,292 m)
- Category 1 – Col de la Colombière (1,605 m)

==== Stage 9 ====
- Category 2 – Côte de Domancy (798 m)
- Category 1 – Col des Saisies (1,648 m)
- Category H – Col du Pré (1,730 m)
- Category 2 – Cormet de Roselend (1971 m)
- Category 1 – Tignes (2084 m)

==== Stage 11 ====
- Category 1 – Col de la Liguière (982 m)
- Category 1 – Mont Ventoux (1,894 m)
- Category H – Mont Ventoux (1,894 m)

==== Stage 14 ====
- Category 2 – Col de Montségur (1,046 m)
- Category 2 – Col de la Croix des Morts (902 m)
- Category 2 – Col de Saint-Louis (705 m)

==== Stage 15 ====
- Category 1 – Montée de Mont-Louis (1,563 m)
- Category 2 – Col de Puymorens (1,914 m)
- Category 1 – Port d'Envalira (2,406 m)
- Category 1 – Col de Beixalis (1,797 m)

==== Stage 16 ====
- Category 2 – Col de Port (1,255 m)
- Category 1 – Col de la Core (1,395 m)
- Category 2 – Col de Portet d'Aspet (1,066 m)

==== Stage 17 ====
- Category 1 – Col de Peyresourde (1,571 m)
- Category 1 – Col de Val Louron-Azet (1,531 m)
- Category H – Col de Portet (2,209 m)

==== Stage 18 ====
- Category H – Col du Tourmalet (2,115 m)
- Category H – Luz Ardiden (1,720 m)

=== 2022 ===
The 2022 Tour de France includes 23 mountain passes or summit finishes, categorized HC, 1, or 2.

==== Stage 7 ====
- Category 1 – La Super Planche des Belles Filles (1,140 m)

==== Stage 9 ====
- Category 2 – Col des Mosses (1445 m)
- Category 1 – Col de la Croix (1778 m)
- Category 1 – Pas de Morgins (1377 m)

==== Stage 10 ====
- Category 2 – Montée de l'altiport de Megève (1382 m)

==== Stage 11 ====
- Category 2 – Lacets de Montvernier (782 m)
- Category 1 – Col du Télégraphe (1566 m)
- Category H – Col du Galibier (2642 m)
- Category H – Col du Granon (2413 m)

==== Stage 12 ====
- Category H – Col du Galibier (2642 m)
- Category H – Col de la Croix de Fer (2067 m)
- Category H – Alpe d'Huez (1850 m)

==== Stage 13 ====
- Category 2 – Col de Parménie (571 m)

==== Stage 14 ====
- Category 2 – Côte de la Croix Neuve (Montée Laurent Jalabert) (1055 m)

==== Stage 16 ====
- Category 1 – Port de Lers (1517 m)
- Category 1 – Mur de Péguère (1375 m)

==== Stage 17 ====
- Category 1 – Col d'Aspin (1490 m)
- Category 2 – La Hourquette d'Ancizan (1564 m)
- Category 1 – Col de Val Louron-Azet (1580 m)
- Category 1 – Peyragudes (1580 m)

==== Stage 18 ====
- Category H – Col d'Aubisque (1709 m)
- Category 1 – Col de Spandelles (1378 m)
- Category H – Hautacam (1520 m)

=== 2023 ===
The 2023 Tour de France includes 30 mountain passes or summit finishes, categorized HC, 1, or 2.

==== Stage 1 ====
- Category 2 – Côte de Vivero (361 m)

==== Stage 2 ====
- Category 2 – Jaizkibel (455 m)

==== Stage 5 ====
- Category H – Col du Soudet (1540 m)
- Category 1 – Col de Marie Blanque (1035 m)

==== Stage 6 ====
- Category 1 – Col d'Aspin (1490 m)
- Category H – Col du Tourmalet (2115 m)
- Category 1 – Cauterets-Cambasque (1355 m)

==== Stage 9 ====
- Category H – Puy de Dôme (1415 m)

==== Stage 10 ====
- Category 2 – Col de la Croix Saint-Robert (1451 m)

==== Stage 12 ====
- Category 2 – Col de la Croix Montmain (737 m)
- Category 2 – Col de la Croix Rosier (717 m)

==== Stage 13 ====
- Category H – Grand Colombier (1501 m)

==== Stage 14 ====
- Category 1 – Col de Cou (1116 m)
- Category 1 – Col du Feu (1117 m)
- Category 1 – Col de la Ramaz (1619 m)
- Category H – Col de Joux Plane (1691 m)

==== Stage 15 ====
- Category 1 – Col de la Forclaz de Montmin (1157 m)
- Category 1 – Col de la Croix Fry (1477 m)
- Category 2 – Côte des Amerands (888 m)
- Category 1 – Saint-Gervais-les-Bains Mont-Blanc (Le Bettex) (1372 m)

==== Stage 16 ====
- Category 2 – Côte de Domancy (810 m)

==== Stage 17 ====
- Category 1 – Col des Saisies (1650 m)
- Category 1 – Cormet de Roselend (1968 m)
- Category 2 – Côte de Longefoy (1174 m)
- Category H – Col de la Loze (2304 m)

==== Stage 20 ====
- Category 2 – Ballon d'Alsace (1173 m)
- Category 2 – Col de la Croix des Moinats (891 m)
- Category 2 – Col de Grosse Pierre (944 m)
- Category 1 – Petit Ballon (1163 m)
- Category 1 – Col du Platzerwasel (1193 m)

=== 2024 ===
The 2024 Tour de France includes 27 mountain passes or summit finishes, categorized HC, 1, or 2.

==== Stage 1 ====
- Category 2 – Col de Valico Tre Faggi (930 m)
- Category 2 – Côte de Barbotto (584 m)
- Category 2 – Côte de San Leo (572 m)

==== Stage 4 ====
- Category 2 – Sestrières (2035 m)
- Category 2 – Col de Montgenèvre (1860 m)
- Category H – Col du Galibier (2642 m)

==== Stage 11 ====
- Category 2 – Col de Néronne (1242 m)
- Category 1 – Pas de Peyrol (1589 m)
- Category 2 – Col du Perthus (1309 m)

==== Stage 14 ====
- Category H – Col du Tourmalet (2115 m)
- Category 2 – La Hourquette d'Ancizan (1564 m)
- Category H – Saint-Lary Pla d'Adet (1669 m)

==== Stage 15 ====
- Category 1 – Col de Peyresourde (1569 m)
- Category 1 – Col de Menté (1349 m)
- Category 1 – Col de Portet d'Aspet (1069 m)
- Category 1 – Col d'Agnes (1570 m)
- Category H – Plateau de Beille (1780 m)

==== Stage 17 ====
- Category 2 – Col Bayard (1246 m)
- Category 1 – Col du Noyer (1664 m)

==== Stage 19 ====
- Category H – Col de Vars (2109 m)
- Category H – Cime de la Bonette (2802 m)
- Category 1 – Isola 2000 (2024 m)

==== Stage 20 ====
- Category 2 – Col de Braus (1002 m)
- Category 1 – Col du Turini (1607 m)
- Category 1 – Col de la Colmiane (1500 m)
- Category 1 – Col de la Couillole (1678 m)

==== Stage 21 ====
- Category 2 – La Turbie (480 m)

=== 2025 ===
The 2025 Tour de France includes 26 mountain passes or summit finishes, categorized HC, 1, or 2.

==== Stage 10 ====
- Category 2 – Côte de Loubeyrat (707 m)
- Category 2 – Côte de la Baraque (788 m)
- Category 2 – Côte de Charade (850 m)
- Category 2 – Côte de Berzet (818 m)
- Category 2 – Col de Guéry (1268 m)
- Category 2 – Col de la Croix Saint-Robert (1451 m)
- Category 2 – Puy de Sancy (1324 m)

==== Stage 12 ====
- Category 1 – Col du Soulor (1474 m)
- Category 2 – Col des Bordères (1156 m)
- Category H – Hautacam (1520 m)

==== Stage 13 ====
- Category 1 – Peyragudes (1580 m)

==== Stage 14 ====
- Category H – Col du Tourmalet (2115 m)
- Category 2 – Col d'Aspin (1489 m)
- Category 1 – Col de Peyresourde (1569 m)
- Category H – Superbagnères (1804 m)

==== Stage 15 ====
- Category 2 – Pas du Sant (610 m)

==== Stage 16 ====
- Category H – Mont Ventoux (1910 m)

==== Stage 18 ====
- Category H – Col du Glandon (1924 m)
- Category H – Col de la Madeleine (2000 m)
- Category H – Col de la Loze (2304 m)

==== Stage 19 ====
- Category H – Col du Pré (1748 m)
- Category 2 – Cormet de Roselend (1968 m)
- Category H – La Plagne (2052 m)

==== Stage 20 ====
- Category 2– Côte de Thésy (685 m)

=== 2026 ===
The 2026 Tour de France includes 30 mountain passes or summit finishes, categorized HC, 1, or 2.

==== Stage 2 ====
- Category 2 – Côte de Begues (399 m)

==== Stage 3 ====
- Category 1 – Col de Toses (1778 m)

==== Stage 4 ====
- Category 2 – Col de Coudons (883 m)
- Category 2 – Col de Montségur (1059 m)

==== Stage 6 ====
- Category 1 – Col d'Aspin (1489 m)
- Category H – Col du Tourmalet (2115 m)
- Category 2 – Gavarnie-Gèdre (1380 m)

==== Stage 9 ====
- Category 2 – Suc au May (903 m)

==== Stage 10 ====
- Category 2 – Col de la Griffoul (1336 m)
- Category 1 – Pas de Peyrol (Puy Mary) (1589 m)
- Category 1 – Col du Perthus (1309 m)

==== Stage 13 ====
- Category 1 – Ballon d'Alsace (1173 m)

==== Stage 14 ====
- Category 1 – Col du Grand Ballon (1336 m)
- Category 2 – Col du Page (959 m)
- Category 1 – Ballon d'Alsace (1173 m)
- Category 1 – Col du Haag (1233 m)

==== Stage 15 ====
- Category 1 – Le Salève Col de la Croisette (1175 m)
- Category H – Plateau de Solaison (1508 m)

==== Stage 16 ====
- Category 2 – Côte de Larringes (799 m)

==== Stage 18 ====
- Category 1 – Côte d'Engins (854 m)
- Category 2 – Côte de Monteynard (844 m)
- Category 1 – Orcières-Merlette (1825 m)

==== Stage 19 ====
- Category 2 – Col Bayard (1246 m)
- Category 1 – Col du Noyer (1664 m)
- Category 2 – Col d'Ornon (1371 m)
- Category H – Alpe d'Huez (1850 m)

==== Stage 20 ====
- Category H – Col de la Croix de Fer (2067 m)
- Category 1 – Col du Télégraphe (1566 m)
- Category H – Col du Galibier (2642 m)
- Category H – Col de Sarenne (1999 m)
