= List of climbs in cycle racing =

This list of climbs in cycle racing includes locations where stages of prominent races have taken place.

== Andorra ==
- Arcalis (Tour de France and Vuelta a España)
- Port d'Envalira (Tour de France and Vuelta a España)

== Austria ==
- Kitzbüheler Horn (Tour of Austria)

== Belgium ==
- Berendries (Tour of Flanders)
- Bosberg (Tour of Flanders)
- Côte de La Redoute (Liège–Bastogne–Liège)
- Côte de Saint-Nicolas (Liège–Bastogne–Liège)
- Côte de Trieu (Tour of Flanders)
- Edelareberg
- Eikenberg
- Kanarieberg
- Kemmelberg
- Koppenberg
- Kortekeer
- Kruisberg
- Leberg
- Molenberg (Zwalm)
- Mur de Huy (La Flèche Wallonne)
- Muur van Geraardsbergen
- Oude Kwaremont
- Paterberg
- Steenbeekdries
- Taaienberg

== France ==
- Col Agnel (Tour de France)
- Col d'Agnes (Tour de France)
- Col d'Allos (Tour de France)
- Alpe d'Huez (Tour de France)
- La Hourquette d'Ancizan (Tour de France)
- Col des Aravis (Tour de France)
- Col des Ares (Tour de France)
- Col d'Aspin (Tour de France)
- Col d'Aubisque (Tour de France)
- Ax 3 Domaines (Tour de France)
- Port de Balès
- Col du Ballon d'Alsace
- Plateau de Beille
- Little St Bernard Pass
- Col du Berthiand
- Col de la Bonette
- Col du Bonhomme
- Mont Cenis
- Chamrousse
- Col des Chevrères
- Col de la Colombière
- Col de la Core
- Courchevel
- Col de la Croix de Fer
- Col de la Croix de Mounis
- Col de la Croix Fry
- Col de la Croix-Morand
- Les Deux Alpes
- Mont Donon
- Col d'Entremont
- Col d'Èze (Paris–Nice)
- Col de la Faucille
- Col de Font-de-Cère
- Col du Galibier
- Col du Glandon
- Gourette
- Col du Grand Ballon
- Col du Grand Colombier
- Col du Grand Cucheron
- Col du Granier
- Col du Granon
- Guzet-Neige
- Hautacam
- Col de l'Iseran
- Col d'Izoard
- Col de Jambaz
- Col de Joux Plane
- La Planche des Belles Filles
- Port de Larrau
- Col de Latrape
- Col du Lautaret
- Le Markstein
- Port de Lers
- Col de la Lombarde
- Luz Ardiden
- Col de Macuègne
- Col de la Madeleine
- Col de Manse
- Col de Menté
- La Mongie
- Mont Cassel
- Col de Montgenèvre
- Mûr-de-Bretagne
- Col du Noyer
- Col d'Ornon
- Port de Pailhères
- Col de Palaquit
- Mur de Péguère
- Col du Perthus (Massif Central)
- Col du Petit Ballon
- Peyragudes
- Col de Peyresourde
- Pas de Peyrol
- Pla d'Adet
- La Plagne
- Col du Platzerwasel
- Col de Port
- Col de Porte
- Col de Portel
- Col de Portet
- Col de Portet d'Aspet
- Col du Portillon
- Pra-Loup
- Col du Pré
- Puy de Dôme
- Col de la Ramaz
- Rampe de Laffrey
- Col de la République
- Mont Revard
- Risoul
- Cormet de Roselend
- La Rosière, Savoie
- Col des Saisies
- Col de Sarenne
- Col de la Schlucht
- Semnoz
- Col du Soulor
- Super Besse
- Superbagnères
- Les Sybelles
- Col du Télégraphe
- Col du Tourmalet
- Col de Val Louron-Azet

== India ==
- Kalhatty (Tour of Nilgiris)

== Italy ==
- Col Agnel
- Tesero (Giro d'Italia)
- Little St Bernard Pass (Tour de France)
- Breuil-Cervinia
- Campitello Matese
- Cipressa (Milan–San Remo)
- Nivolet Pass
- Colle Fauniera
- Colle Sestriere
- Monte Crostis
- Mount Etna (Giro d'Italia)
- Passo Fedaia
- Colle delle Finestre (Giro d'Italia)
- Furkelpass
- Gavia Pass (Giro d'Italia)
- Giau Pass (Giro d'Italia)
- Piancavallo
- Gran Sasso d'Italia
- Monte Grappa
- Kronplatz
- Col de la Lombarde
- Sanctuary of the Madonna di San Luca (Giro dell'Emilia)
- Lysjoch
- Madonna del Ghisallo (Il Lombardia)
- Madonna di Campiglio
- Maiella (includes the Blockhaus climb)
- Mauria Pass
- Monte Cassino
- Monte Terminillo
- Montecampione
- Montevergine
- Mortirolo Pass (Giro d'Italia)
- Muro di Sormano (Il Lombardia)
- Sanctuary of Oropa
- Poggio di San Remo (Milan–San Remo)
- Pordoi Pass
- Prati di Tivo
- Prato Nevoso
- Roccaraso
- Colle di Sampeyre
- San Fermo della Battaglia
- San Marco Pass
- Seiser Alm
- Sella Pass
- Sestriere
- Stelvio Pass (Giro d'Italia)
- Superga (Milano–Torino)
- Tonale Pass
- Tre Cime di Lavaredo
- Passo del Turchino
- Umbrail Pass
- Vajolet Towers
- Vivione Pass
- Monte Zoncolan (Giro d'Italia)

== Netherlands ==
- Cauberg (Amstel Gold Race)
- Eyserbosweg (Amstel Gold Race)
- Keutenberg (Amstel Gold Race)
- Vaalserberg (Amstel Gold Race)

== Spain ==
- Aitana (Vuelta a España)
- Alto Campoo (Vuelta a España)
- Alto de l'Angliru (Vuelta a España)
- Formigal Ski Resort
- Jaizkibel
- La Camperona
- La Covatilla
- Jaizkibel (Clásica de San Sebastián)
- La Molina (ski resort)
- La Pandera
- Lakes of Covadonga
- Port de Larrau
- Las Praderas, Nava
- Los Machucos
- Mirador de Ézaro
- Montjuïc (Volta a Catalunya)
- Monte Naranco
- Port Ainé
- Port del Cantó
- Col du Portillon
- Sierra de Cazorla
- Sierra Nevada Ski Station
- Valdelinares
- Vallter 2000 (Volta a Catalunya)

== Switzerland ==
- Albula Pass
- Champex Pass
- Col de la Croix
- Col des Mosses
- Col des Planches
- Crans-Montana
- Flüela Pass
- Furka Pass
- Gotthard Pass
- Grimsel Pass
- Klausen Pass
- Lukmanier Pass
- Monte Ceneri
- Nufenen Pass
- Samnaun
- Sanetsch Pass
- Susten Pass
- Verbier
- Vercorin
- Wildhaus Pass

== United Kingdom ==
- Bear Road, Brighton
- Box Hill, Surrey
- Buttertubs Pass
- Caerphilly mountain (Tour of Britain)
- Cat and Fiddle Road
- Ditchling Beacon
- Elm Grove, Brighton
- Farthing Common
- Great Dun Fell
- Gun (Staffordshire)
- Haytor
- Holme Moss
- Honister Pass
- Kirkstone Pass
- Leith Hill
- Oliver's Mount
- Porlock Toll Road
- Rosedale Chimney Bank
- Sutton Bank
- The Tumble
- Whinlatter Pass

== United States ==
- Brasstown Bald (Tour de Georgia)
- Mount Blue Sky
- Mount Diablo
- Independence Pass (Colorado)
- Lookout Mountain (Colorado)
- Monarch Pass
- Monarch Ski Area
- Morgul-Bismark
- Mount Crested Butte, Colorado
- Mountain High
- Mount San Antonio
- Snowbird, Utah
- Mount Washington (New Hampshire)
