= Raid Pyrénéen =

The Raid Pyrénéen is a timed bicycle challenge over a route that traverses the length of the Pyrenees between Hendaye on the Atlantic coast and Cerbère on the Mediterranean, organised by Cyclo Club Béarnais since 1950.

== Format ==
It can be completed in either direction - West to East, which is the most popular, or East to West. Around 300 people complete this "randonnée" each year, between 1 June and 30 September, either entering the event as an individual and riding independently, taking care of their own arrangements, or joining an organised event run by one of the many tour companies, who look after all the arrangements and support the riders - either staying in hotels, or camping.

There are two official versions: a 720 km route to be completed in under 100 hours for randonneurs or a 790 km route to be completed in under 10 days for cycle-tourists. A medal and certificate are awarded on successful completion. Participants enter the event by contacting the CCB and obtaining an official "carnet", which they get stamped at various control points (usually cafés or shops) along the route. There is a modest entry fee, which covers the carnet, the certificate and the medal.

== Route ==
The 10-day route passes over 28 cols:

Location	Altitude (m)
Hendaye (Control)	0
Col Saint Ignace	169
Col Pinodeita	176
Col Budincurutcheta	1135
Col Bagargui	1319
Col de Marie-Blanque	1035
Col d'Aubisque	1709
Col du Soulor	1474
Col des Borderes	1156
Col du Tourmalet	2115
Col d'Aspin	1489
Col de Peyresourde	1569
Col du Portillon	1293
Col de Menté	1349
Col de Portet d'Aspet	1069
Col de la Core	1395
Col de la Trappe	1111
Col d'Agnes	1570
Port de Lers	1517
Col de Marmares	1361
Col de Chioula	1431
Col de Pailheres	2001
Col de Moulis	1099
Col de Garabel	1267
Col de Jau	1513
Col de Palomere	1036
Col Xatard	752
Col Fourtou	646
Col Llauro	380

The 100-hour route passes over 18 cols, although riders have the option of adding the Marie Blanque if they wish:

Sequence	Location	Altitude (m)
1	Hendaye (Control)	0
2	Col Saint Ignace	169
3	Col Pinodeita	176
4	Espelette (Control)	58
5	Col d’ Osquich	500
6	Tardets-Sorholus (Control)	286
7	Col de Marie-Blanque **Optional**	1035
8	Col d'Aubisque (Control)	1709
9	Col du Soulor	1474
10	Col du Tourmalet	2115
11	La Mongie (Control)	1750
12	Col d'Aspin	1489
13	Col de Peyresourde	1569
14	Col des Ares	797
15	Col de Portet d'Aspet	1069
16	St Girons (Control)	392
17	Col de Caougnous	947
18	Col de Port	1249
19	Col de Puymorens	1920
20	Col de Lious	1345
21	Col Rigat	1488
22	Col de la Perche	1570
23	Prades (Control)	354
24	Col Saint Pierre	185
25	Col de Ternére	200
26	Cerbère (Control)	0
