= Col de la Croix =

Col de la Croix ("Pass of the Cross") is the name of the following passes:

- Col de la Croix (Vaud), an Alpine pass in the canton of Vaud, Switzerland
- Col de la Croix (Jura), a pass of the Jura range in the canton of Jura, Switzerland
- Col de la Croix (Cottian Alps) (or "Passo della Croce"), an Alpine pass in the Cottian Alps

== See also ==
- Col des Croix, a pass of the Vosges mountains; see List of mountain passes and hills in the Tour de France
- Col de la Croix du Bonhomme, an Alpine pass in France; see Ultra-Trail du Mont-Blanc
- Col de la Croix de Chaubouret, a pass in the Pilat massif
- Col de la Croix de Fer, an Alpine pass in France
- Col de la Croix Fry, an Alpine pass in France
- Col de la Croix Haute, an Alpine pass in France
- Côte de la Croix Jubaru, Hainaut Province, Belgium
- Croix de Montvieux; see List of mountain passes and hills in the Tour de France
- Col de la Croix-Morand, a mountain pass of the Massif Central of southern France
- Col de la Croix de Mounis, a mountain pass in the Parc naturel régional du Haut-Languedoc of southern France
- Côte de la Croix-Neuve, a mountain pass in the Massif Central of southern France; see List of mountain passes and hills in the Tour de France
- Col de la Croix de la Serra, a pass of the Jura range in Ain, France; see List of mountain passes and hills in the Tour de France
- Col de la Croix Saint Robert, a mountain pass in Puy-de-Dôme, France; see List of mountain passes and hills in the Tour de France
