= Gouaux-de-Larboust =

- Commune
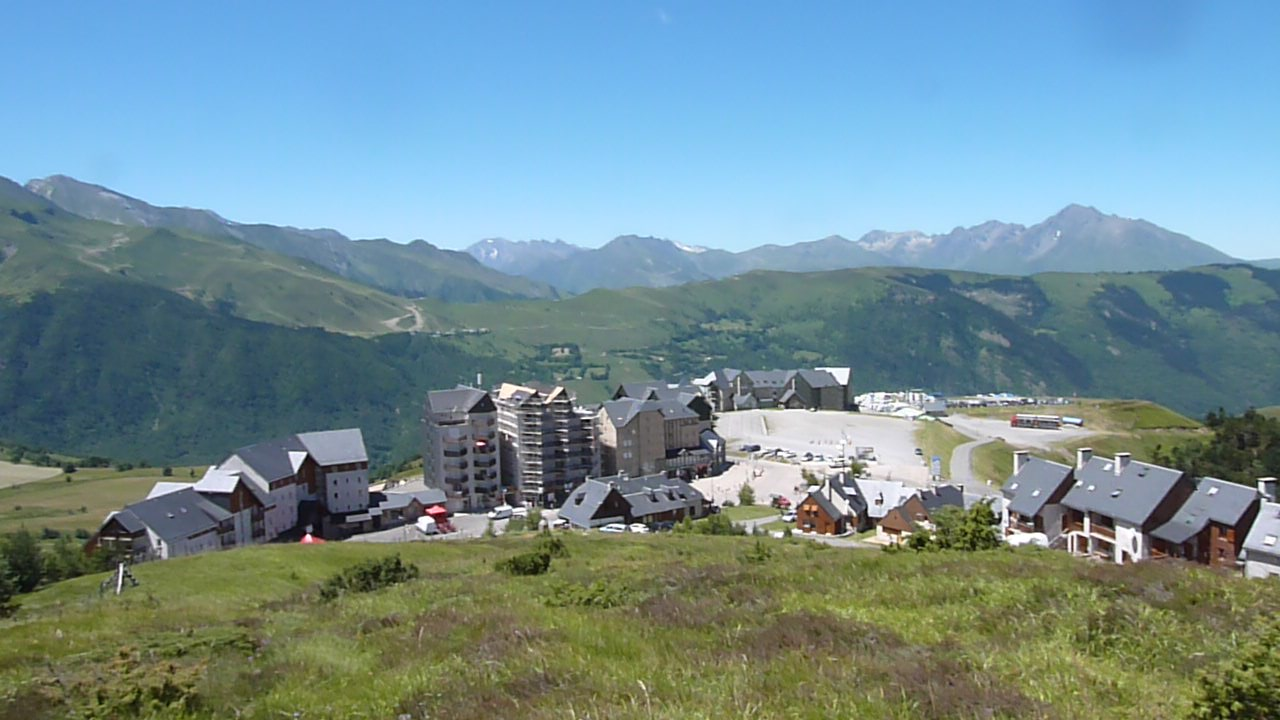
- Peyragudes
- Location of Gouaux-de-Larboust
- Location within France Location within Occitanie
- Coordinates: 42°47′45″N 0°29′22″E
- Country: France
- Region: Occitania
- Department: Haute-Garonne
- Arrondissement: Saint-Gaudens
- Canton: Bagnères-de-Luchon

Government
  - Mayor (2020–2026): Serge De Peco
- Area^{1}: 10.67 km^{2} (4.12 sq mi)
- Elevation: 1,400 m (4,600 ft)
- Highest elevation: 2,370 m (7,780 ft)
- Lowest elevation: 1,120 m (3,670 ft)
- Population (2023): 40
  - Density: 3.7/km^{2} (9.7/sq mi)
- Time zone: UTC+01:00 (CET)
  - Summer (DST): UTC+02:00 (CEST)
- INSEE/Postal code: 31221 /31110
- ^{1} French Land Register data, which excludes lakes, ponds, glaciers > 1 km^{2} (0.386 sq mi or 247 acres) and river estuaries.

Gouaux-de-Larboust is a commune in the Haute-Garonne department in southwestern France.

== Population ==
Historical population
Year	Pop.	±% p.a.
1968	74	—
1975	88	+2.51%
1982	46	−8.85%
1990	67	+4.81%
1999	65	−0.34%
2007	46	−4.23%
2012	57	+4.38%
2017	67	+3.29%
2023	40	−8.24%
Source: INSEE

== Sport ==
The ski resort of Peyragudes is high in the Pyrenees in the commune.

== See also ==
- Communes of the Haute-Garonne department
