= Col de Beixalis =

Mountain pass in Andorra

- Collada de Beixalis
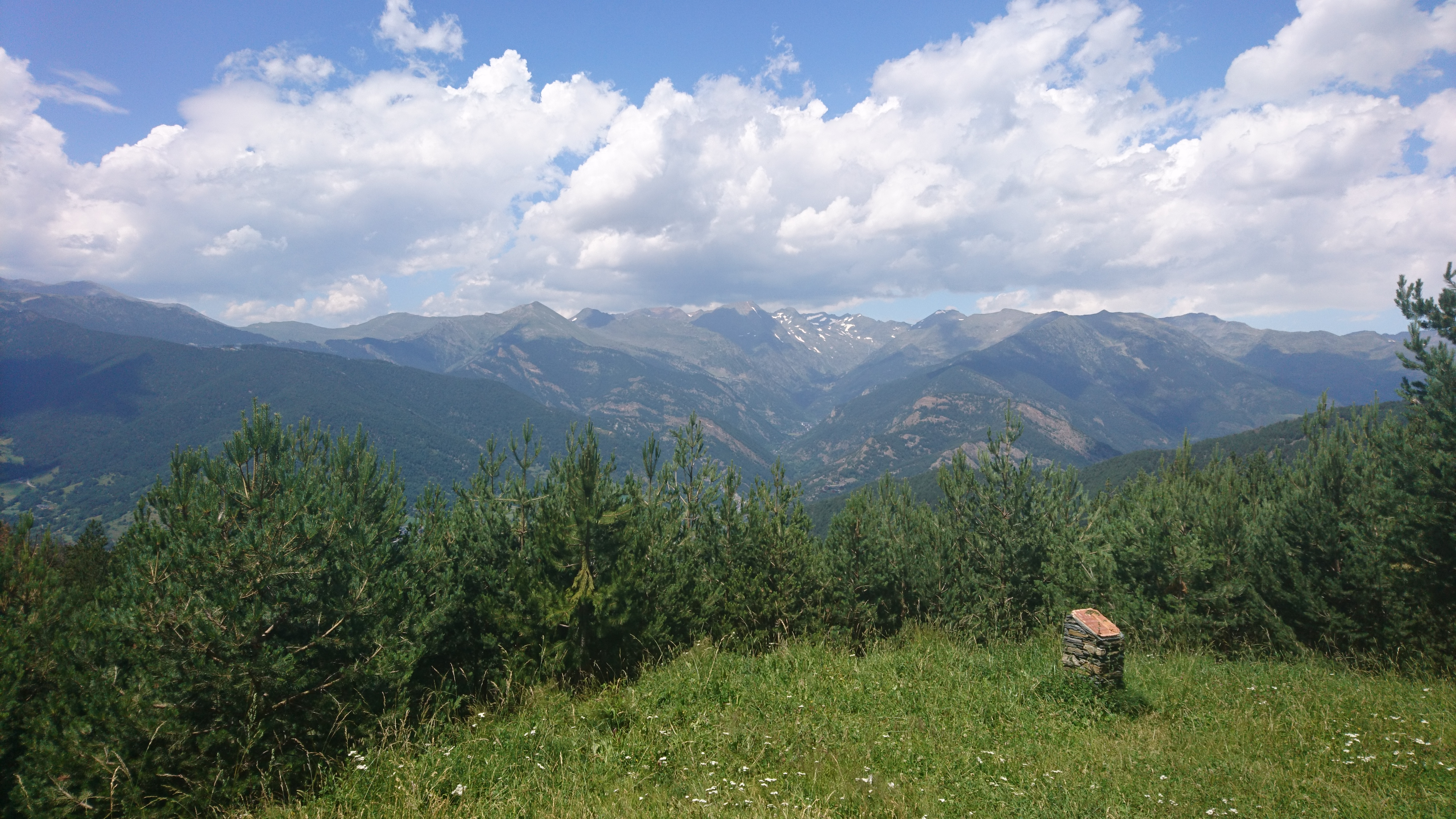

- Location within Andorra
- Elevation: 1,795 metres (5,889 ft)

Third Approach
- Location: Encamp, Andorra
- Range: Pyrenees
- Coordinates: 42°31′50.8764″N 1°33′9.072″E

The Col de Beixalis, or Collada de Beixalis, is a mountain pass at an altitude of 1,795 metres (5,889 ft) located in Andorra.

The road is situated between Anyós to the west and Encamp to the east. The last 2.5 kilometres (1.6 mi) on the eastern side of the climb was a gravel road, but it has now been paved.

The route from the eastern side was used on Stage 9 of the 2016 Tour de France. It was also included in the 2021 Tour de France as the final climb of stage 15. Sepp Kuss was the leader at the summit and went on to win the stage.
