= Col de Romme =

Mountain pass in the French Alps

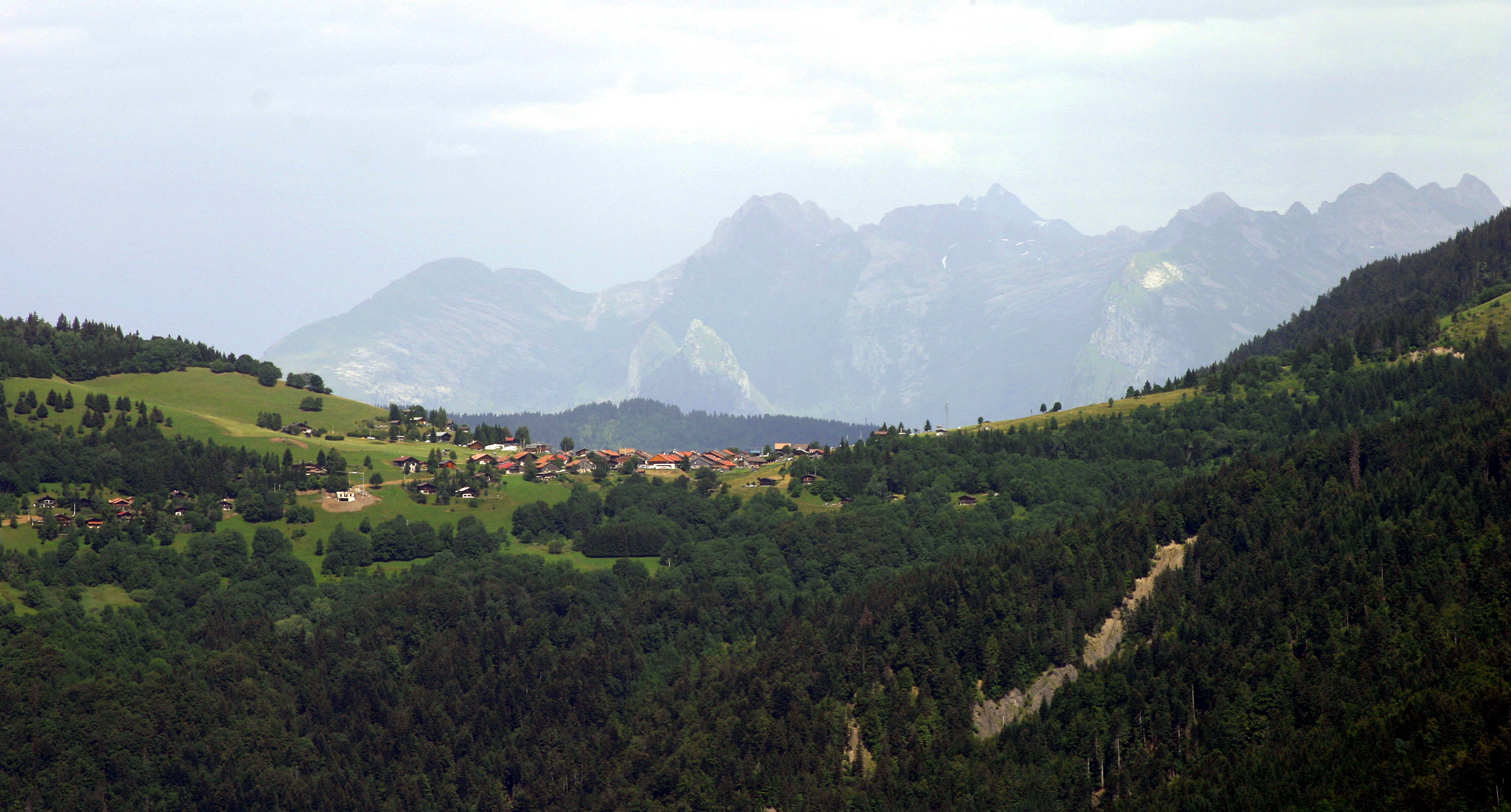
- Interactive map of Col de Romme
- Elevation: 1,297 m (4,255 ft)

Third Approach
- Range: French Alps

The Col de Romme is a pass located in the French Alps, in the Haute-Savoie department, at an altitude of 1,297 m (4,255 ft). The Romme ski resort is located nearby.

== Cycling ==
=== Tour de France ===
The pass was ascended via the northern approach by cyclists in the 2009 Tour de France, in the 17th stage. Luxembourgish rider Fränk Schleck was first over the pass. In the 2018 Tour de France, Julian Alaphilippe summited the pass first during Stage 10. On the 8th stage of the 2021 Tour de France from Oyonnax to Le Grand-Bornand, after 122.5 kilometres (76.1 mi), Michael Woods was first over the pass.

=== Critérium du Dauphiné libéré ===
The pass was climbed during the 1992 Critérium du Dauphiné Libéré. It was also on the programme for the 5th stage of the 2020 edition.

=== Profile of the ascension ===
The climb has an average gradient of 8.7 percent, over 8.3 kilometres (5.2 mi) of climbing. Starting from Cluses, the first 2 kilometres (1.2 mi) have an average gradient of more than 11 percent. Kilometres two to four vary between 8 and 9 percent, increasing to 13 percent at the end. The next kilometre, at 7.3 percent, passes through the village of Nancy-sur-Cluses. After this, the slope becomes steeper, with an average of almost 9.9 percent over the fifth and sixth kilometres. The last two kilometres switch from 9.3 to 7.5 percent before reaching the Romme ski resort.
