= Col de Port =

Mountain pass in France

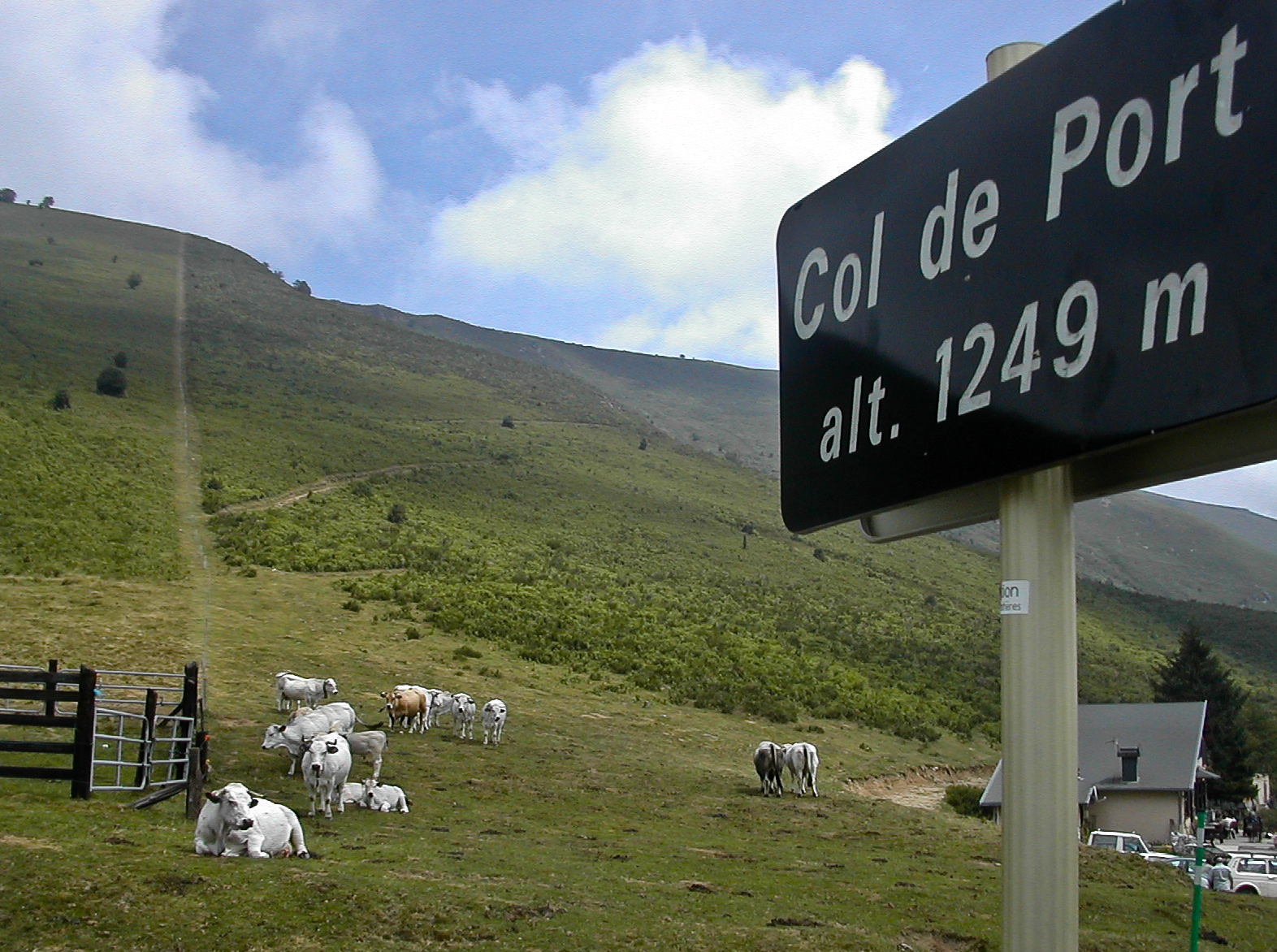
- Cows grazing at Col de Port

- Location within Pyrenees
- Elevation: 1,250 metres (4,100 ft)
- Traversed by: D618

Third Approach
- Location: Ariège, France
- Range: Pyrenees
- Coordinates: 42°53′56″N 1°27′10″E

Col de Port (elevation 1,250 m (4,100 ft)) is a mountain pass in the French Pyrenees between Massat and Tarascon-sur-Ariège in the "massif de l'Arize". It links the Couserans and Ariège valleys.

The pass is used occasionally in the Tour de France and is popular with touring cyclists.

The name of the pass is tautological as Col means pass in French and Port means pass in Occitan.

== Details of the climb ==
Starting from the D8/D618 junction, (Tarascon-sur-Ariège) (east) the Col de Port is 17.0 km (10.6 mi) long. Over this distance, the climb is 777 m (2,549 ft) (an average gradient of 4.6%). The steepest section is 9.0%.

Starting from Massat, (west) the Col de Port is 12.8 km (8.0 mi) long. Over this distance, the climb is 601 m (1,972 ft) (an average gradient of 4.7%).The steepest section is 6.5%.

From Massat, the D18 to the south links with the route from Aulus-les-Bains and Vicdessos between the Col d'Agnes (1,570 m (5,150 ft)) and the Port de Lers (1,517 m (4,977 ft)).

== Tour de France ==
The Col de Port was first used in the Tour de France in 1910. The first cyclist over the summit was Octave Lapize.

=== Appearances in the Tour de France (since 1947) ===
The Tour de France has crossed the summit 11 times since 1947, including on stage 16 of the 2021 tour. The 15th stage was selected for the 2007 L'Étape du Tour, in which amateur and club riders ride over a full stage of the tour.

Year	Stage	Category	Start	Finish	Leader at the summit
2021	16	2	El Pas de la Casa	Saint-Gaudens	Mattia Cattaneo (ITA)
2009	8	2	Andorra la Vella	Saint-Girons	Sandy Casar (FRA)
2007	15	2	Foix	Loudenvielle	Juan Manuel Gárate (ESP)
2002	12	2	Lannemezan	Plateau de Beille	Laurent Jalabert (FRA)
1998	11	2	Bagnères-de-Luchon	Plateau de Beille	Roland Meier (SUI)
1997	10	2	Bagnères-de-Luchon	Andorra–Arcalis	Laurent Brochard (FRA)
1976	13	2	Font-Romeu	Saint-Gaudens	Roland Smet (FRA)
1968	13	3	Saint-Gaudens	La Seu d'Urgell	Andrés Gandarias (ESP)
1965	10	3	Bagnères-de-Bigorre	Ax-les-Thermes	Rik Van Looy (BEL)
1957	17	Uncategorized	Ax-les-Thermes	Saint-Gaudens	Désiré Keteleer (BEL)
1947	14	2	Carcassonne	Bagnères-de-Luchon	Albert Bourlon (FRA)
