= Col de Néronne =

Mountain pass in France

- Location within France
- Elevation: 1,241 metres (4,072 ft)

Third Approach
- Location: Cantal, France
- Range: Mounts of Cantal (Massif central)
- Coordinates: 45°09′17″N 2°35′32″E

The Col de Néronne is a mountain pass located in the Massif Central in France. At an altitude of 1,241 meters, it is situated in the Auvergne-Rhône-Alpes region, in the Cantal department, on the border of the communes of Saint-Paul-de-Salers and Le Falgoux.

== Geography ==
It is located on the edge of the communal forest of Le Falgoux and within the Auvergne Volcanoes Regional Natural Park.

== History ==
Initiated by workers who were building the Aigle Dam, a group of Resistance fighters, notably led by André Decelle (alias Commander Didier), gathered and trained in the burons near the pass. After a significant airdrop of weapons on July 14, 1944, as part of Operation Cadillac, more than 1,000 men gradually became operational.

One of the burons has been turned into a museum of the Resistance, initiated by the Amicale des Compagnons du Barrage de l’Aigle.

== Cycling ==
It was used by the Tour de France in 1959, 2004, 2016, 2020, and 2024.

Year	Stage	Category	Start	Finish	Leader at the summit
2024	11	2	Evaux-les-Bains	Le Lioran	Ben Healy (IRL)
2020	13	2	Châtel-Guyon	Puy Mary Pas de Peyrol	Maximilian Schachmann (GER)
2016	5	3	Limoges	Le Lioran	Thomas De Gendt (BEL)
2004	10	2	Limoges	Saint-Flour	Richard Virenque (FRA)
1959	14		Aurillac	Clermont-Ferrand	
