= Port de Balès =

Mountain pass in the Pyrenees in France

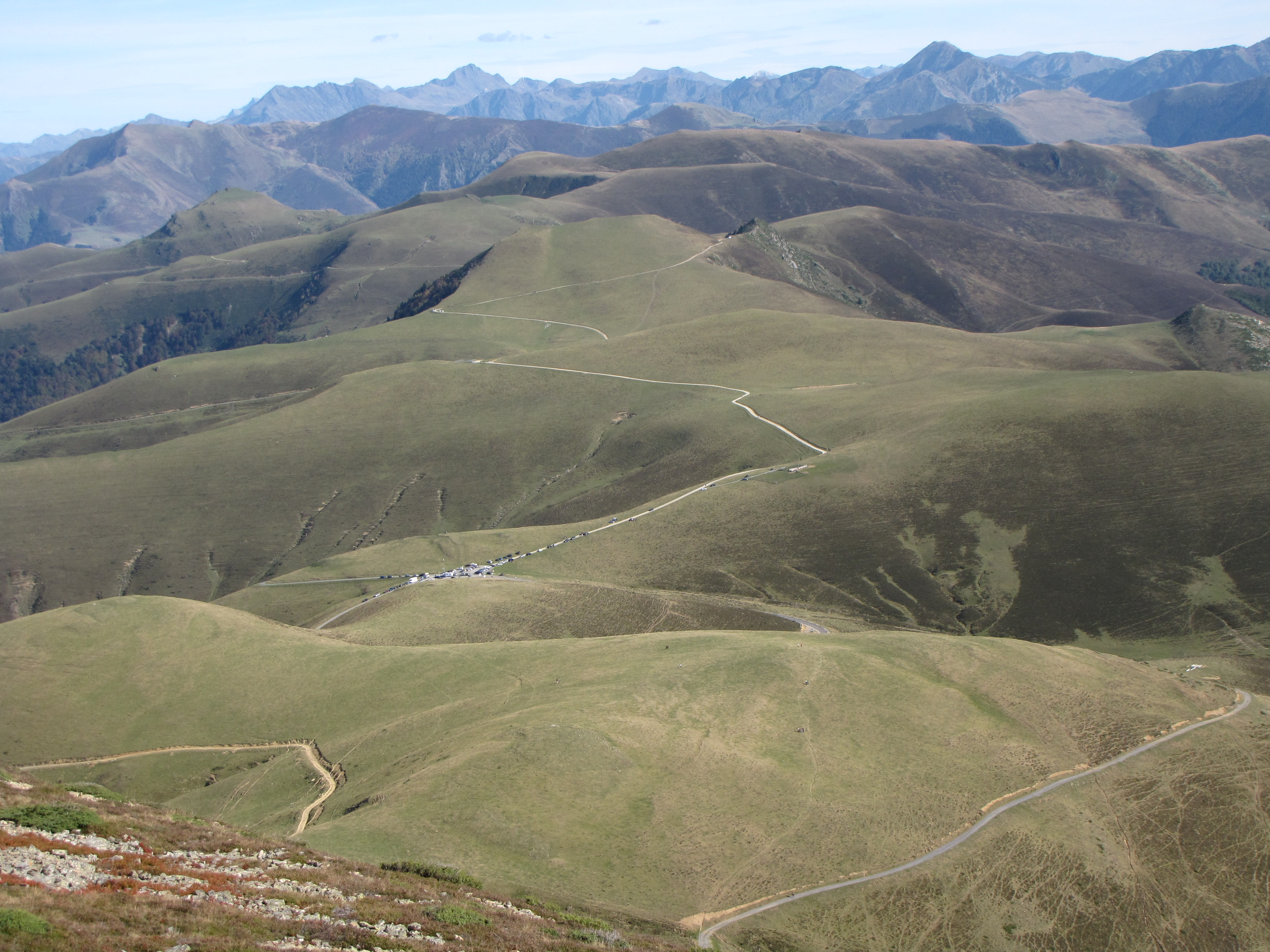
- The summit is by the cluster of vehicles

- Location within Pyrenees
- Elevation: 1,755 metres (5,758 ft)
- Traversed by: D925/D51

Third Approach
- Location: Hautes-Pyrénées, France
- Range: Pyrenees
- Coordinates: 42°52′27″N 0°30′03″E

The Port de Balès (or Col de Balès) (elevation 1,755 m (5,758 ft)) is a mountain pass in the central Pyrenees in the department of Hautes-Pyrénées in France. It connects the village of Ferrère (to the north) to that of Bourg-d'Oueil, Haute-Garonne (south-east).

The Port de Balès was first featured in the 2007 Tour de France and has since appeared in the tour every two/three years. It is generally closed by snow for long periods during the winter but remains popular with bikers during the summer.

== History ==
The Port de Balès was for a long time ignored by the modern world. Located between the Barousse valley to the north and the Oueil valley above Bagnères-de-Luchon, it was served only by one narrow track from the north until the beginning of the 1980s. Then several forest tracks were opened above Ferrère to serve the mountain pastures. A few years later, another track was built from Bourg d'Oueil. This track was continued to the Col de Pierrefite giving access to the Bareilles and Louron valleys.

These tracks were only suitable for agricultural and forestry vehicles, or cars equipped with 4-wheel drive, but the main route over the col was given a treatment of tarmac in the 1980s. By the end of the 1990s this had deteriorated severely, and remained virtually impassable until resurfaced during the summer of 2006. This was partly done at the instigation of the Tour de France organisers, who were looking for new challenges with which to confront the tour riders.

== Cycling racing ==
The Tour de France crossed the col for the first time in 2007 on stage 15. This stage was selected for the 2007 L'Étape du Tour, in which amateur and club riders ride over a full stage of the tour. During the 2010 Tour de France it was the scene of arguably one of the defining moments of the race, when Contador (Astana) attacked then race leader Andy Schleck on the climb when the latter had a mechanical problem with his chain. Contador continued his attack, took over the yellow jersey and won 39 seconds, ironically the exact amount of advantage he had in Paris when he won the Tour. Contador later had this win revoked, and Schleck is now officially listed as the winner of the 2010 Tour de France.

=== Details of climb ===
Starting from Mauléon-Barousse, the climb is 18.9 km (11.7 mi) long. Over this distance, the climb is 1,185 m (3,888 ft) at an average gradient of 6.3%, with the steepest sections at 14%.

Starting from Bagnères-de-Luchon, the climb is 19.7 km (12.2 mi) long. Over this distance, the climb is 1,125 m (3,691 ft) at an average gradient of 5.7%, but with several sections over 11%. At its southern end, the climb starts on the foot of the climb to the Col de Peyresourde which has been used many times in the Tour de France.

=== Appearances in Tour de France ===
| Year | Stage | Category | Start | Finish | Leader at the summit |
|---|---|---|---|---|---|
| 2007 | 15 | HC | Foix | Loudenvielle | Kim Kirchen (LUX) |
| 2010 | 15 | HC | Pamiers | Bagnères-de-Luchon | Thomas Voeckler (FRA) |
| 2012 | 17 | HC | Bagnères-de-Luchon | Peyragudes | Alejandro Valverde (ESP) |
| 2014 | 16 | HC | Carcassonne | Bagnères-de-Luchon | José Serpa (COL) |
| 2017 | 12 | HC | Pau | Peyragudes | Steve Cummings (GBR) |
| 2020 | 8 | HC | Cazères | Loudenvielle | Nans Peters (FRA) |

=== Vuelta a España ===
The Vuelta a España crossed the col in 2013.

| Year | Stage | Category | Start | Finish | Leader at the summit |
|---|---|---|---|---|---|
| 2013 | 15 | 1 | Andorra la Vella | Peyragudes | André Cardoso (POR) |
