= Col du Perthus (Massif Central) =

Mountain pass in Cantal, France

- Location within France
- Elevation: 1,309 m (4,295 ft)
- Traversed by: D317

Third Approach
- Location: Cantal, France
- Range: Mounts of Cantal (Massif Central)
- Coordinates: 45°03′29″N 02°40′25″E

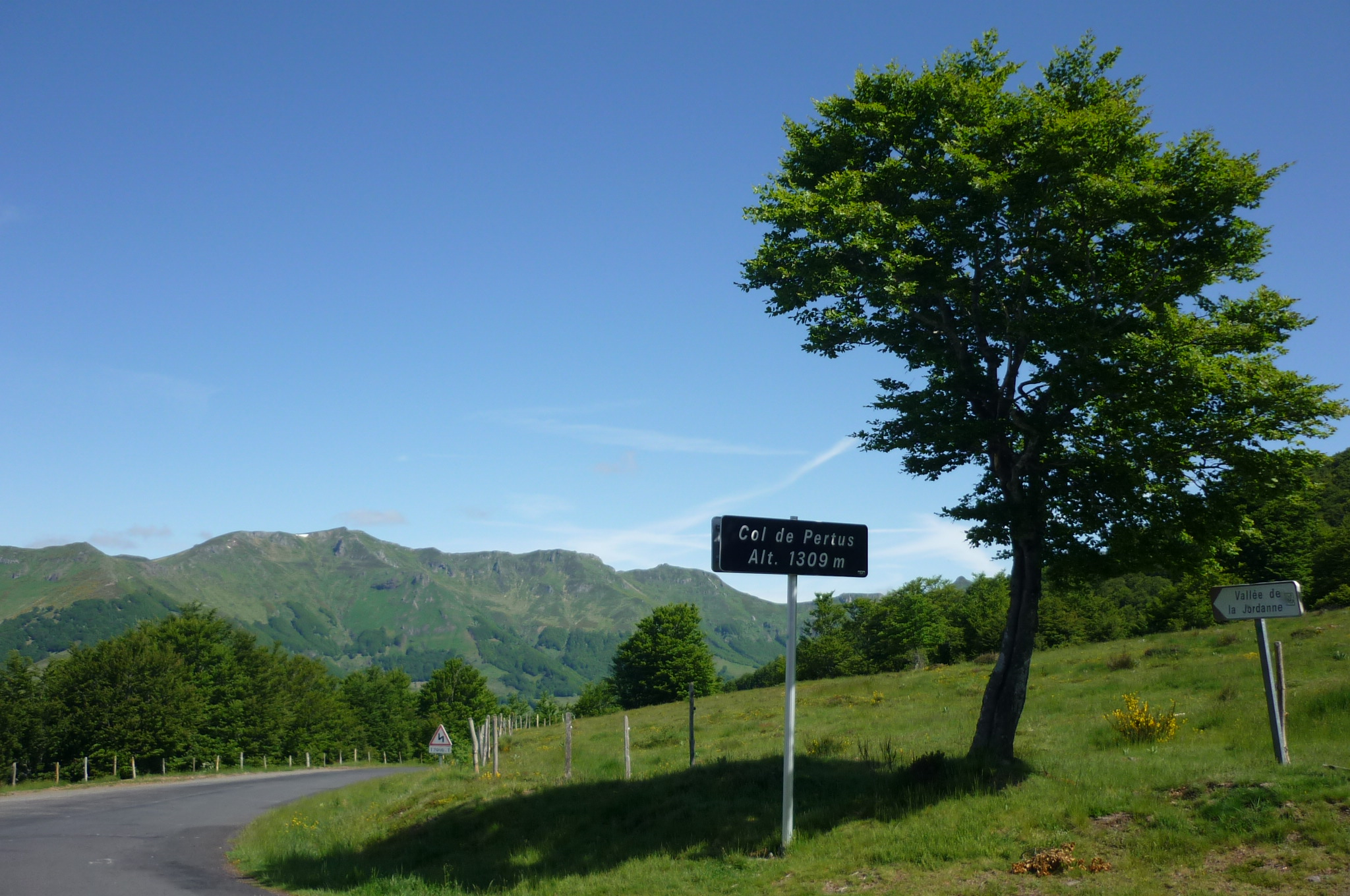

The Col du Perthus or Col du Pertus is a mountain pass ascending to an altitude of 1,309 metres (4,295 ft) in the Mounts of Cantal and in the department of the same name, in the Massif Central.

It was used in the 2011 Tour de France during Stage 9. It was classified as a Category 2 climb with Johnny Hoogerland being the first to summit. It was used again by the Tour de France on 6 July 2016 during the Stage 5 of the 2016 Tour. It was then also classified as a Category 2 climb and with Greg Van Avermaet being the first to summit. The climb was later used in Stage 11 of the 2024 Tour, with Tadej Pogačar leading at the top of the climb. The climb was used in Stage 10 of the 2026 Tour, classified as a category 1 climb. Pogačar again led at the top of the climb.

== Appearances in the Tour de France ==
The Tour de France has crossed the climb 4 times.

Year	Stage	Category	Start	Finish	Leader at the summit
2011	9	2	Issoire	Saint-Flour	Johnny Hoogerland (NED)
2016	5	2	Limoges	Le Lioran	Greg Van Avermaet (BEL)
2024	11	2	Evaux-les-Bains	Le Lioran	Tadej Pogačar (SLO)
2026	10	1	Aurillac	Le Lioran	Tadej Pogačar (SLO)
