= Col de la Croix (Jura) =

Mountain pass in Jura, Switzerland

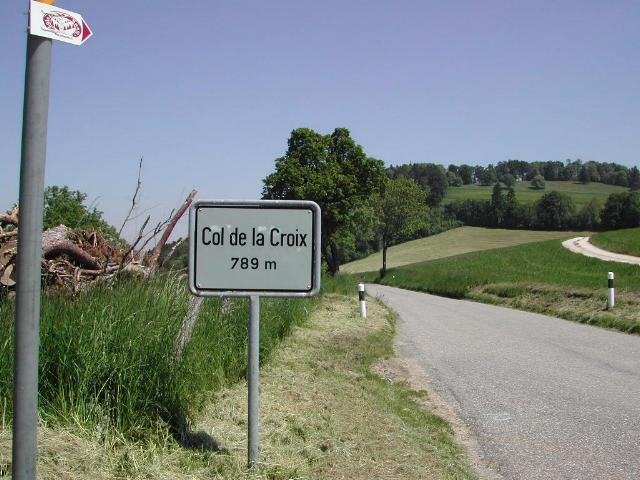
- The pass in the canton of Jura

- Location within Alps
- Elevation: 789 m (2,589 ft)

Location
- Location: Switzerland
- Range: Jura Mountains
- Coordinates: 47°22′22″N 07°08′29″E

Col de la Croix (el. 789 m.) is a pass in the Jura Mountains connecting Saint-Ursanne and Courgenay, both in the canton of Jura in Switzerland.

== Cycle racing ==
=== Details of the climb ===
The climb from Saint-Ursanne is 3.72 km. long, gaining 342 m. in height at an average of 9.1%. Several sections of the climb are well in excess of this with the maximum gradient of 17% being reached at the summit.

=== Tour de France ===
It was crossed in Stage 8 of the 2012 Tour de France on 8 July, where it was ranked as a Category 1 climb. The first rider over the climb was Thibaut Pinot, who went on to win the stage.
