= Col de la Ramaz =

Mountain pass in the French Alps

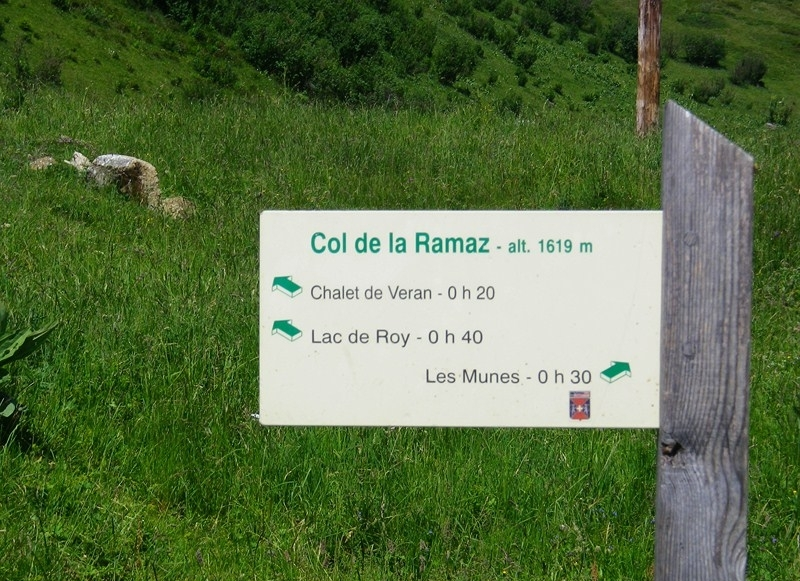
- Highest point of the road, 60 meters above the pass itself
- Interactive map of Col de la Ramaz
- Elevation: 1,559 metres (5,115 ft)

Third Approach
- Location: Haute-Savoie, France
- Range: Alps
- Coordinates: 46°9′48″N 6°34′29″E

Col de la Ramaz (pronounced with a silent z "Ramá") (elevation 1559 m.) is a high mountain pass in the Alps in the department of Haute-Savoie in France through which the Tour de France passed during 2003, 2010, 2016 and the 2023 race). The road through the pass culminates slightly higher, at 1619m (5312 feet).

== Details of the Climb ==
From Mieussy (southwest), the climb is 14.05 km long, with elevation gain of 982 m, an average gradient of 7%, and maximum gradient of 12%.

From Taninges (south), the climb is 16 km long, with elevation gain of 970 m, an average gradient of 6.1%, and maximum gradient of 10.6%.

== Appearances in the Tour de France ==
Year	Stage	Category	Start	Finish	Leader at the summit
2023	14	1	Annemasse	Morzine	Wout van Aert (BEL)
2016	20	1	Megève	Morzine	Thomas de Gendt (BEL)
2010	8	1	Station des Rousses	Morzine-Avoriaz	Mario Aerts (BEL)
2003	7	1	Lyon	Morzine	Richard Virenque (FRA)
1981	16	1	Thonon-les-Bains	Morzine	Hubert Linard (FRA)

== See also ==
- List of highest paved roads in Europe
- List of mountain passes
