= Col d'Ornon =

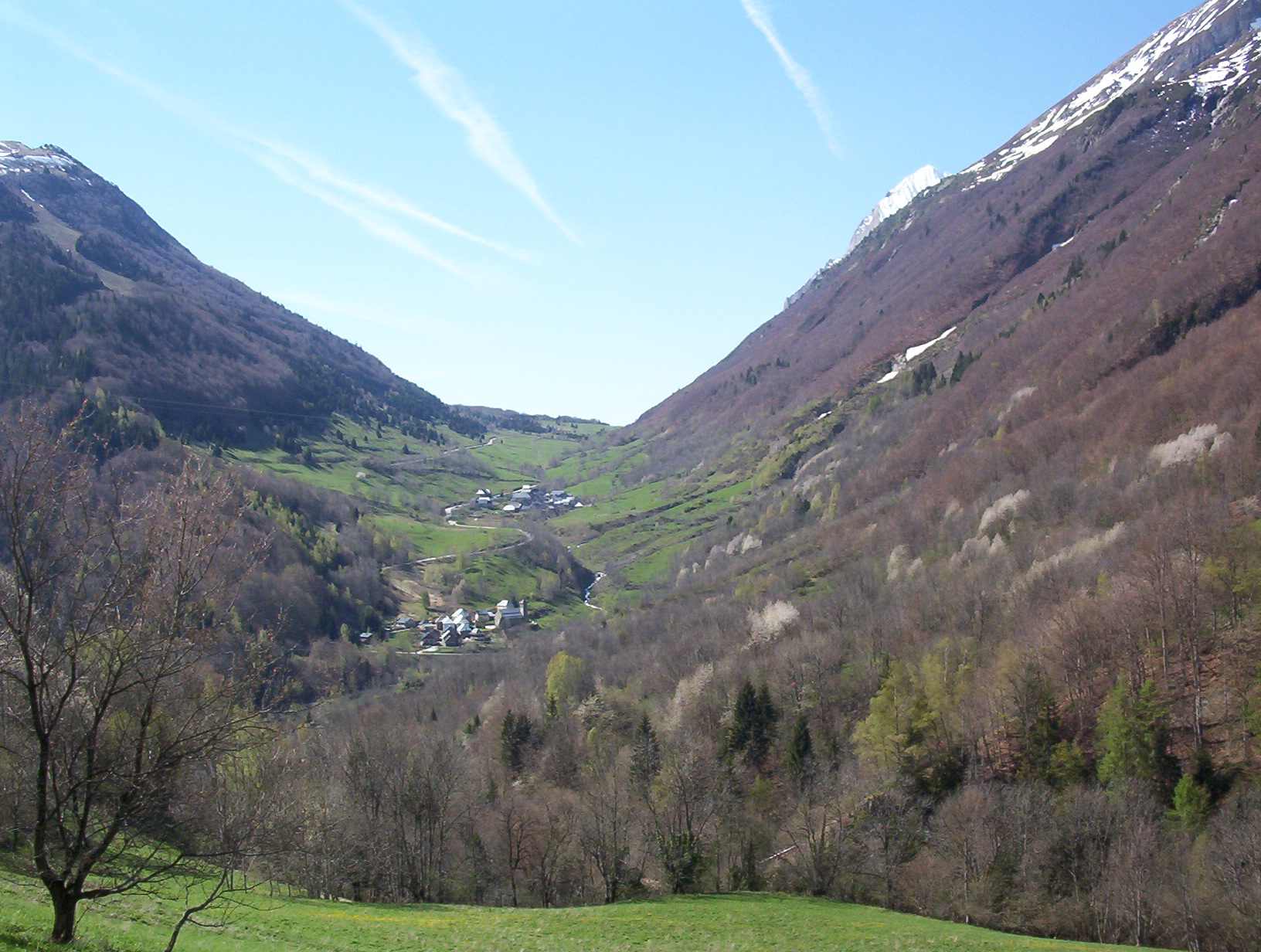
- Col d'Ornon in spring seen from the road to the village of Ornon

- Location within Alps
- Elevation: 1,360 m (4,460 ft)
- Traversed by: D526

Third Approach
- Location: Isère, France
- Range: Dauphiné Alps
- Coordinates: 45°0′32″N 5°58′3″E

Col d'Ornon (1,360 m (4,462 ft)) is a mountain pass through the Dauphiné Alps in the department of Isère in France which connects the communities of Le Bourg-d'Oisans and La Mure. The climb is used occasionally in the Tour de France cycle race, including on the "Queen stage" on 18 July 2013 which finishes with two ascents to Alpe d'Huez.

== Details of the climb ==
From the south, the climb starts at Entraigues, from where the ascent is 14.4 km (8.9 mi) long gaining 563 m (1,847 ft) in height at an average gradient of 3.9%, with maximum gradient of 7.4%. For the 2013 Tour de France, the climb officially starts at the village of Chantelouve (1,030 m (3,379 ft)) from where the climb to the summit, ranked Category 2, is a further 5.1 km (3.2 mi) at a gradient of 6.7%.

From the north, the climb commences 3 km (2 mi) from Le Bourg-d'Oisans at La Paute in the Romanche valley. The ascent is 11.1 km (6.9 mi) long, climbing 643 m (2,110 ft) at an average gradient of 5.8%, with maximum gradient of 8.6%.

== Tour de France ==
The Col d'Ornon was first used in the Tour de France in 1966 when the leader over the summit was Luis Otaño. Overall, the Tour has passed the summit on nine occasions, usually as a Second Category climb, including on Stage 19 of the 2026 Tour.

=== Appearances in Tour de France ===
Year	Stage	Category	Start	Finish	Leader at the summit
2026	19	2	Gap	Alpe d'Huez	Richard Carapaz (ECU)
2017	17	2	La Mure	Serre Chevalier	Michael Matthews (AUS)
2013	18	2	Gap	Alpe d'Huez	Arnold Jeannesson (FRA)
2002	15	2	Vaison-la-Romaine	Les Deux-Alpes	Axel Merckx (BEL)
1994	16	2	Valréas	Alpe d'Huez	Ángel Camargo (COL)
1991	17	2	Gap	Alpe d'Huez	Pello Ruiz Cabestany (ESP)
1982	16	2	Orcières-Merlette	Alpe d'Huez	Bernard Vallet (FRA)
1979	18	3	Alpe d'Huez	Alpe d'Huez	Bernard Bourreau (FRA)
1966	15	2	Privas	Le Bourg-d'Oisans	Luis Otaño (ESP)
