= Col des Saisies =

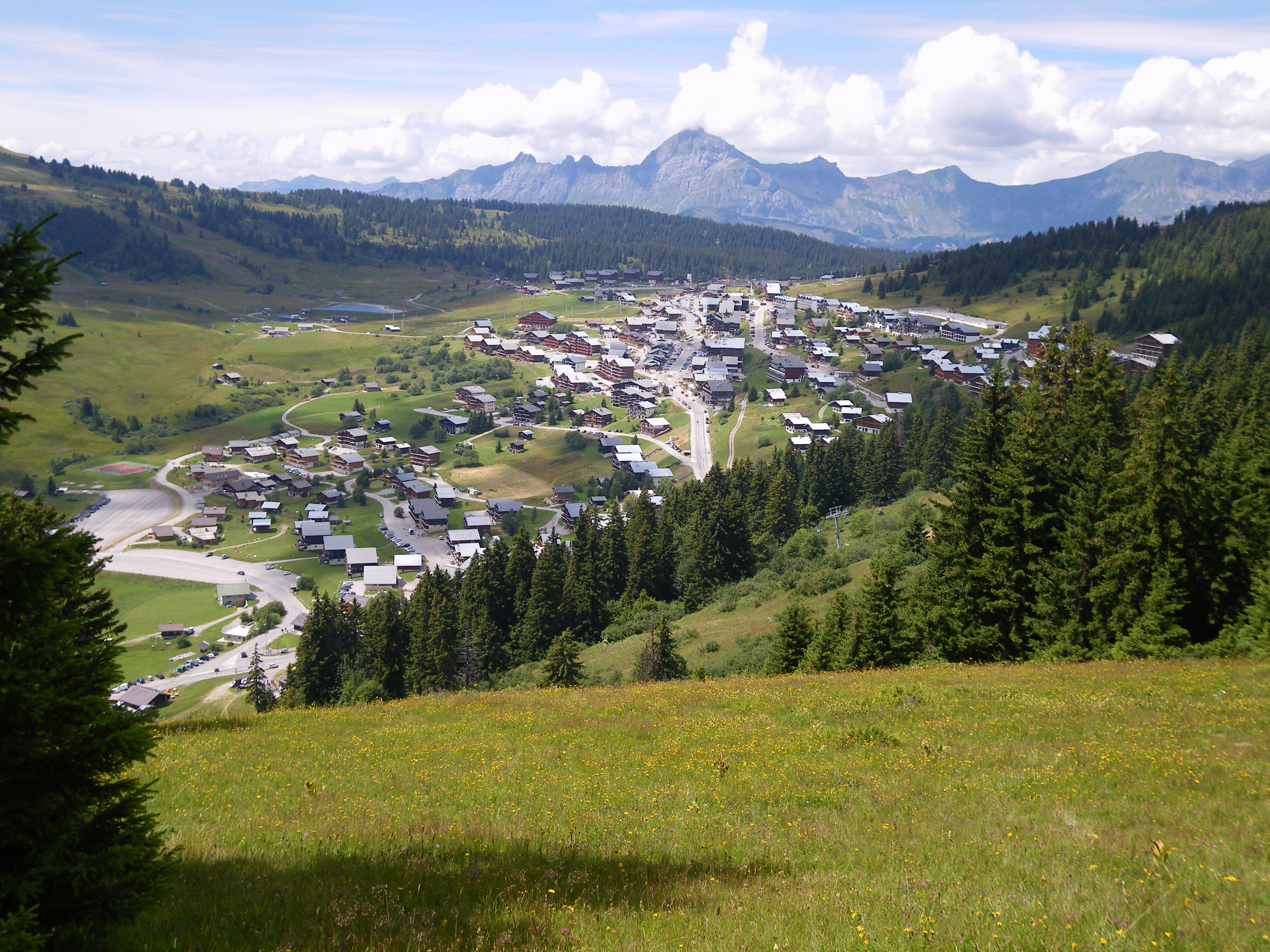

- Location within Alps
- Elevation: 1,657 metres (5,436 ft)
- Traversed by: D 925/D 218

Third Approach
- Location: Savoie, France
- Range: Alps
- Coordinates: 45°45′30″N 6°31′43″E

Col des Saisies (el. 1657 m.) is a mountain pass in the Alps in the department of Savoie in France.

The pass is delimited by the peak of Bisanne to the west, and by the peaks of Légette (Lézette) and Chard du Beurre to the east. The ski resort of Les Saisies is situated on the pass.

== Appearances in Tour de France ==
The pass is often used as part of the route in the Tour de France, most recently in 2023.

Year	Stage	Category	Start	Finish	Leader at the summit
2023	17	1	Saint-Gervais Mont-Blanc	Courchevel	Giulio Ciccone (ITA)
2021	9	1	Cluses	Tignes	Wout Poels (BEL)
2020	18	2	Méribel	La Roche-sur-Foron	Marc Hirschi (SUI)
2010	9	1	Morzine-Avoriaz	Saint-Jean-de-Maurienne	Jérôme Pineau (FRA)
2009	17	1	Bourg-Saint-Maurice	Le Grand-Bornand	Thor Hushovd (NOR)
2006	17	1	Saint-Jean-de-Maurienne	Morzine	Patrice Halgand (FRA)
2002	17	1	Aime	Cluses	Mario Aerts (BEL)
2000	16	1	Courchevel	Morzine	Marco Pantani (ITA)
1995	9	1	Le Grand-Bornand	La Plagne	Federico Muñoz (COL)
1994	18	1	Moûtiers	Cluses	Peter De Clercq (BEL)
1992	13	2	Saint-Gervais	Sestrières	Claudio Chiappucci (ITA)
1987	22	2	La Plagne	Morzine	Omar Hernández (COL)
1984	19	2	La Plagne	Morzine	Pedro Delgado (ESP)
1979	16	2	Morzine-Avoriaz	Les Menuires	Henk Lubberding (NED)

== See also ==
- List of highest paved roads in Europe
- List of mountain passes
