= Col du Noyer =

Mountain pass in France

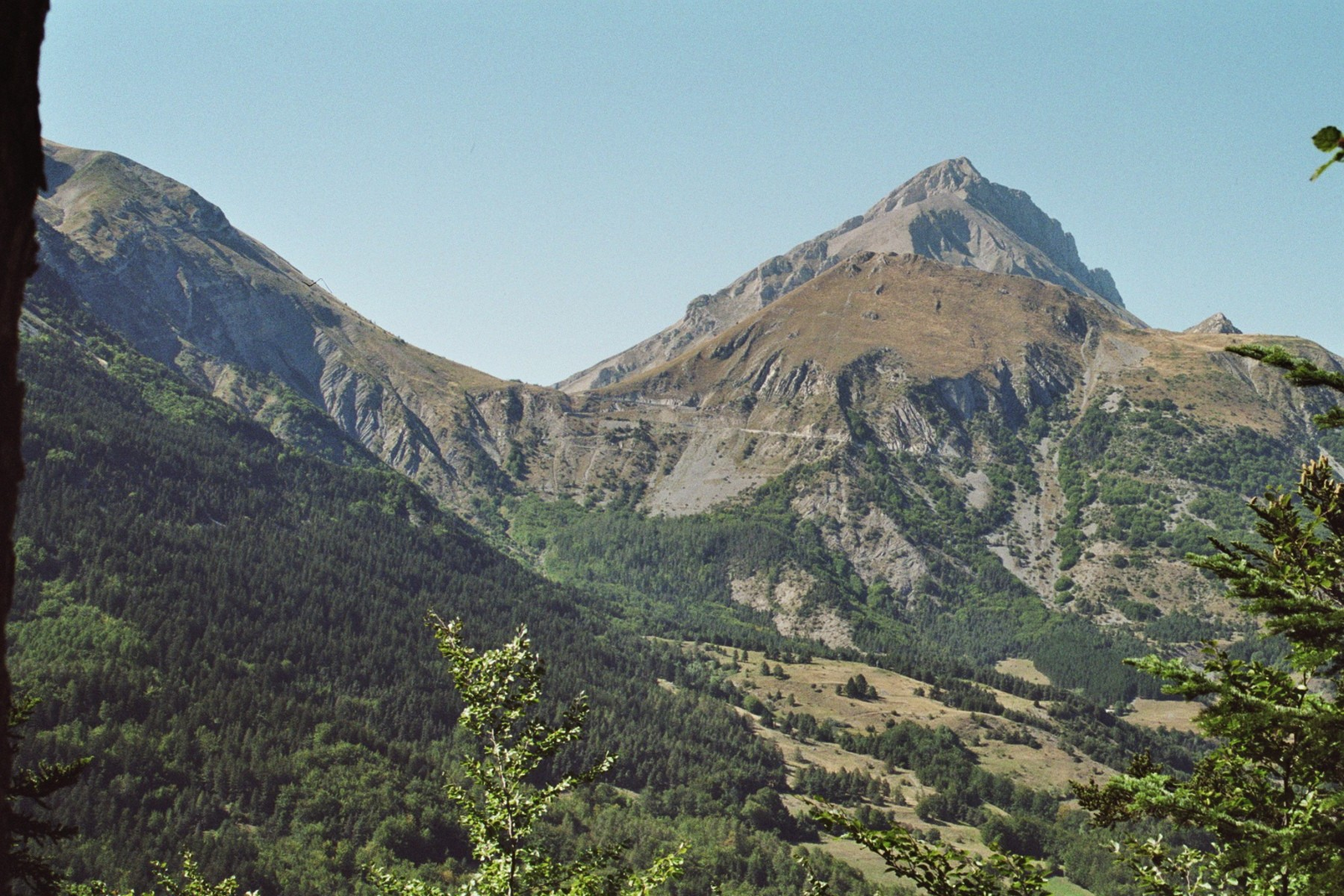
- Col du Noyer, seen from Champsaur.
- Interactive map of Col du Noyer
- Elevation: 1,664 m (5,459 ft)
- Traversed by: D 17

Third Approach
- Location: Hautes-Alpes, France
- Range: Alps
- Coordinates: 44°41′31″N 5°59′7″E

Col du Noyer (el. 1664 m.) is a high mountain pass in the Alps in the department of Hautes-Alpes in France.

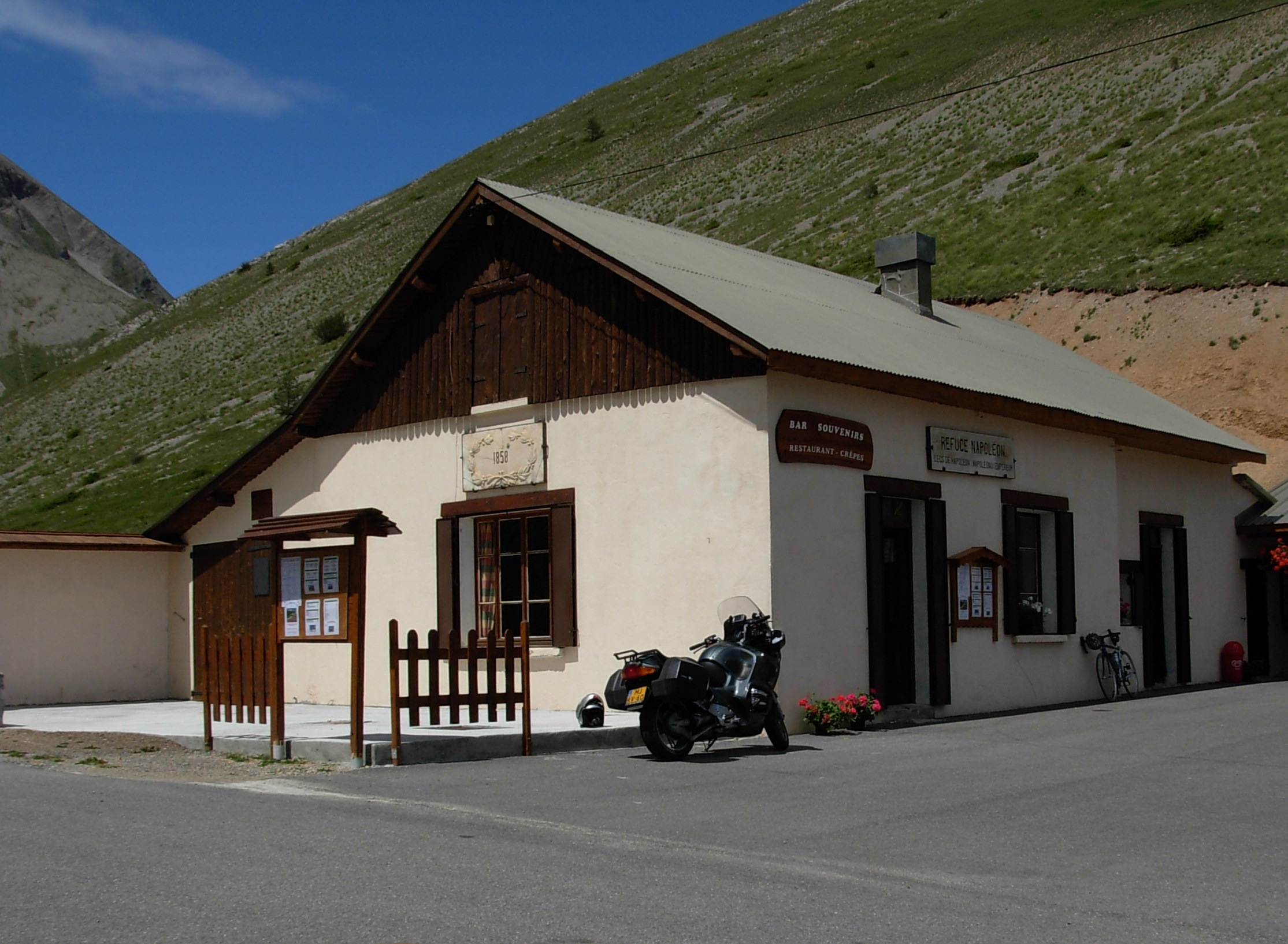
Napoléon's refuge at col du Noyer.

== Details of the climb ==
From Le Noyer, the climb is 7.5 km, with an elevation gain of 616 m, an average gradient of 8.2%, and maximum gradient of 14.5%.

From Saint-Disdier, the climb is 14.5 km, with an elevation gain of 616 m, an average gradient of 4.3%, and maximum gradient of 7.5%.

== Appearances in Tour de France ==
The pass was first included in the Tour de France in 1970 and has since featured 6 times, most recently in 2026.

Year	Stage	Category	Start	Finish	Leader at the summit
2026	19	1	Gap	Alpe d'Huez	Valentin Paret-Peintre (FRA)
2024	17	2	Saint-Paul-Trois-Châteaux	SuperDévoluy	Richard Carapaz (ECU)
2010	10	2	Chambéry	Gap	Mario Aerts (BEL)
1982	15	2	Manosque	Orcières-Merlette	Pascal Simon (FRA)
1971	11	2	Grenoble	Orcières-Merlette	Luis Ocaña (ESP)
1970	13	1	Grenoble	Gap	Raymond Delisle (FRA)

== See also ==
- Cycling Col du Noyer - Maps, Profiles, Photos
- List of highest paved roads in Europe
- List of mountain passes
