= Col du Berthiand =

Mountain pass in Ain, France

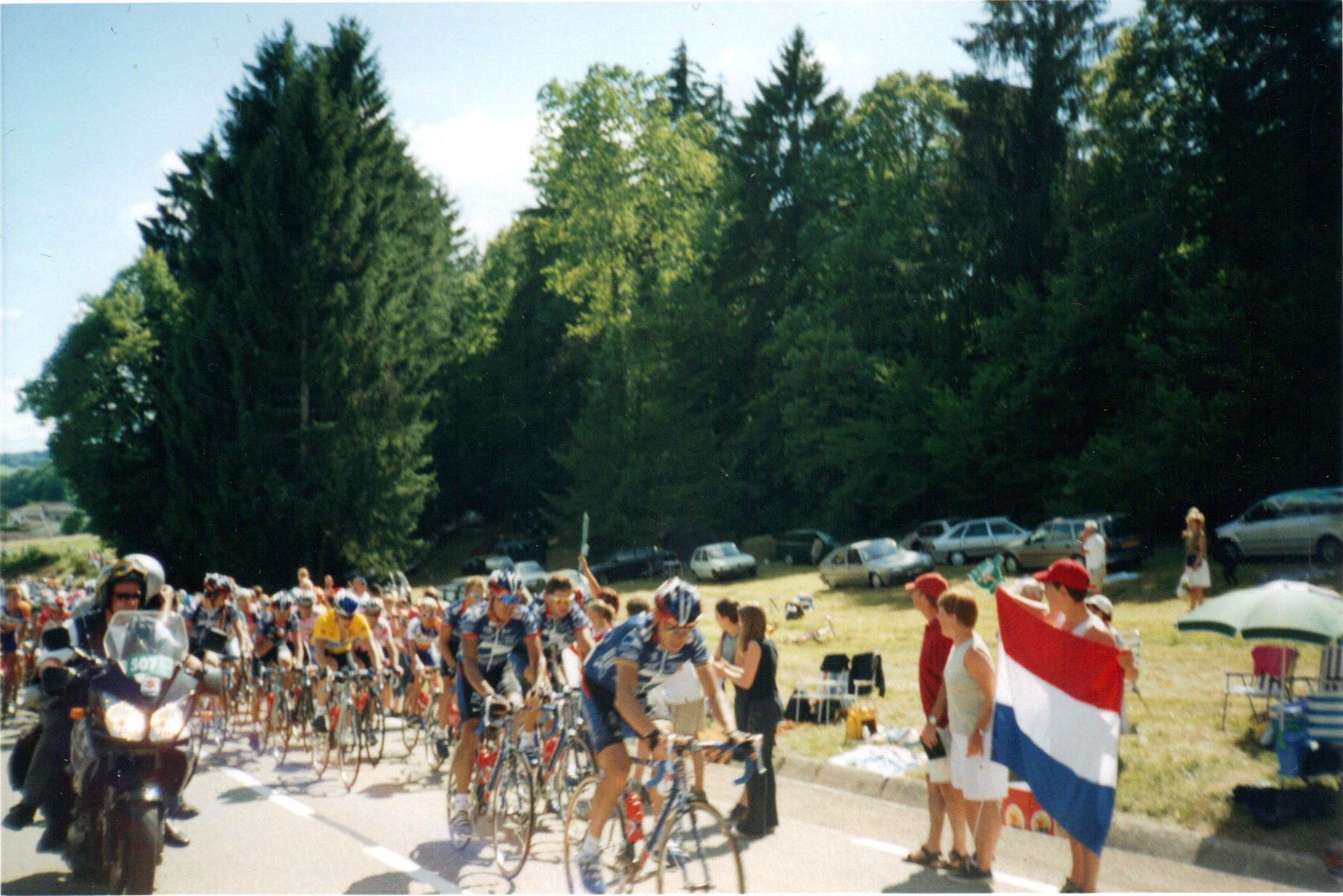
- Passage of the 2002 Tour de France on the Col du Berthiand

- Location within Alps
- Elevation: 780 m (2,560 ft)
- Traversed by: RD979

Location
- Location: Ain, France
- Range: Jura
- Coordinates: 46°10′22″N 05°29′38″E

The Col du Berthiand is a mountain pass rising to 780 metres (2,560 ft) above sea level, situated on the Montagne de Berthiand in the Jura Mountains. It is located in the department of Ain in France and joins the commune of Serrières-sur-Ain with Nurieux-Volognat.

== Toponymy ==
The name, like those of the Montagne de Berthiand and the hamlet of Berthiand originate from Bertoldingos ("with the Bertoldingi") derived from the family name Bertoald.

== Cycling ==
The Tour de France has traversed the Col du Berthiand on four occasions, the last being during the 2016 Tour de France, with Rafał Majka first over the top. The riders who crossed in the lead are shown in the table:

Year	Stage	Category	Start	Finish	Leader at the summit
1991	20	2	Aix-les-Bains	Mâcon	Claudio Chiappucci (ITA)
2002	18	2	Cluses	Bourg-en-Bresse	Jörg Jaksche (GER)
2006	18	2	Morzine	Mâcon	Sylvain Calzati (FRA)
2016	15	1	Bourg-en-Bresse	Culoz	Rafał Majka (POL)

In the more distant past, it illustrated the skill of Charly Gaul, in particular during the Circuit des Six-Provinces in 1954, but also during the Tour des provinces du Sud-Est in 1955.
