= Col de la Core =

Mountain pass in the French Pyrenees

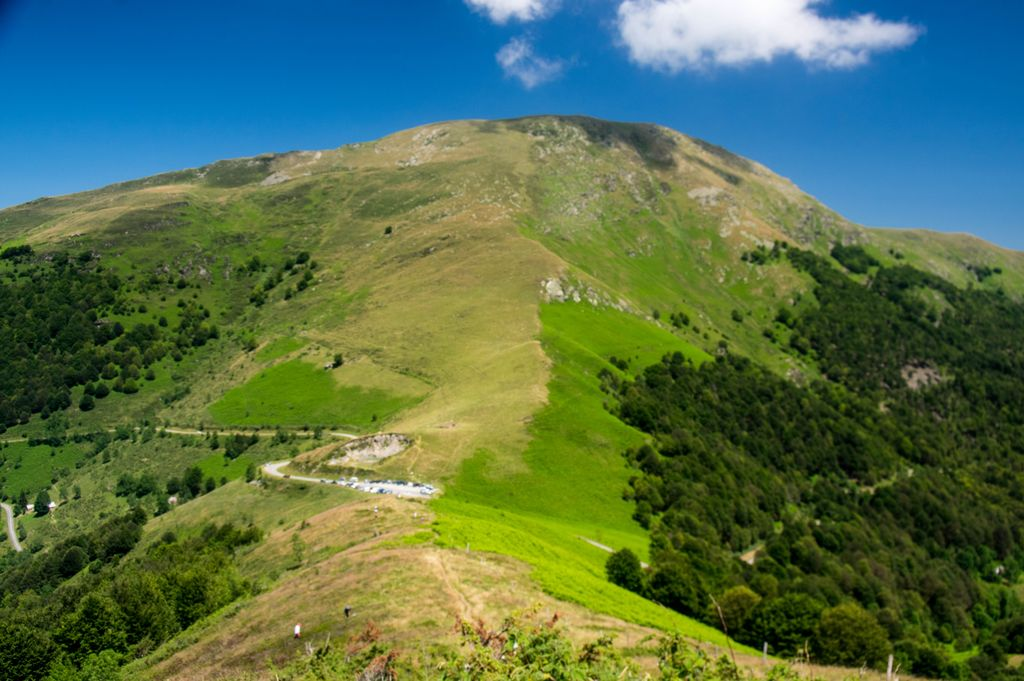
- Core pass under Cap de Bouirex

- Location within Pyrenees
- Elevation: 1,395 metres (4,577 ft)
- Traversed by: D17

Third Approach
- Location: Ariège, France
- Range: Pyrenees
- Coordinates: 42°51′32″N 1°6′18″E

The Col de la Core (elevation 1,395 m (4,577 ft)) is a mountain pass in the Ariège department of France in the Pyrenees. It connects Audressein with Seix.

== Details of climb ==
Starting from Audressein, the climb is 17.5 km (10.9 mi) long. Over this distance, the climb is 885 m (2,904 ft) (an average of 5.1%). The climb proper starts at Les Bordes-sur-Lez, from where it is 14.1 km at 5.7%, with the steepest section being at 8.0%.

Starting from Seix, the climb is 13.8 km (8.6 mi) long. Over this distance, the climb is 885 m (2,904 ft) (an average of 6.4%), with the steepest section being at 8.0%.

== Appearances in Tour de France ==
The Col de la Core was first used in the Tour de France in 1984, since when it has featured eight times, most recently in 2021, when the leader over the summit was Patrick Konrad.

Year	Stage	Category	Start	Finish	Leader at the summit
2021	16	1	El Pas de la Casa	Saint-Gaudens	Patrick Konrad (AUT)
2015	12	1	Lannemezan	Plateau de Beille	Kristijan Đurasek (CRO)
2011	14	1	Saint-Gaudens	Plateau de Beille	Mickaël Delage (FRA)
2004	13	1	Lannemezan	Plateau de Beille	Sylvain Chavanel (FRA)
2003	14	1	Saint-Girons	Loudenvielle	Richard Virenque (FRA)
2002	12	1	Lannemezan	Plateau de Beille	Laurent Jalabert (FRA)
1998	11	2	Bagnères-de-Luchon	Plateau de Beille	Roland Meier (SUI)
1984	11	1	Pau	Guzet-Neige	Jean-René Bernaudeau (FRA)
