= Col du Portillon =

Mountain pass on the France–Spain border

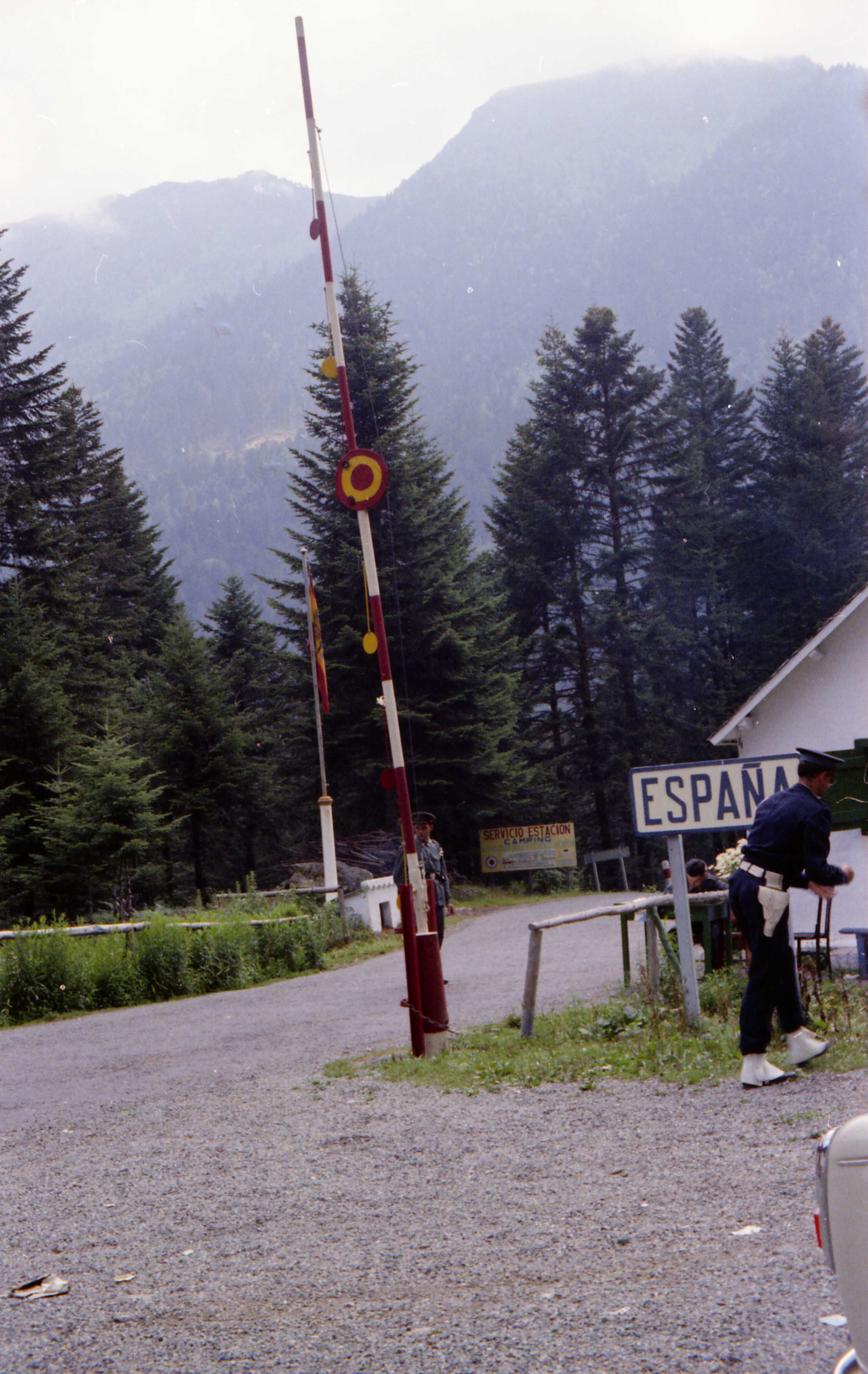
- Col du Portillon : Spanish frontier post (1965)

- Location within Pyrenees
- Elevation: 1,293 m (4,242 ft)
- Traversed by: D618A / N-141

Third Approach
- Location: Haute Garonne, France; Lleida, Spain
- Range: Pyrenees
- Coordinates: 42°46′9″N 0°39′36″E

The Col du Portillon (Catalan: El coll de Portilló) (elevation 1,293 metres (4,242 ft)) is a mountain pass in the Pyrenees on the border between France and Spain. It connects Bagnères-de-Luchon in France with Bossòst in the Val d'Aran, Spain.

== Details of climb ==
Starting from Bossòst, the climb is 8.6 km (5.3 mi) long. Over this distance, the climb is 583 m (1,913 ft) at an average of 6.8%. The steepest section is at 8.2%, 3 km (2 mi) from the summit.

Starting from Bagnères-de-Luchon, the climb is 10.2 km (6.3 mi) long. Over this distance, the climb is 663 m (2,175 ft) at an average of 6.5%. The final 7.9 km (4.9 mi) is at an average gradient of 8.4%, with the steepest section being at 14%.

== Appearances in Tour de France ==
The Col du Portillon was first used in the Tour de France in 1957, since when it has featured 20 times, most recently in 2018, when the leader over the summit was Adam Yates.

Year	Stage	Category	Start	Finish	Leader at the summit
2018	16	1	Carcassonne	Bagnères de Luchon	Adam Yates (GBR)
2014	17	1	Saint-Gaudens	Pla d'Adet	Joaquim Rodríguez (ESP)
2006	11	1	Tarbes	Pla-de-Beret	David de la Fuente (ESP)
2005	15	1	Lézat-sur-Lèze	Pla d'Adet	Karsten Kroon (NED)
2003	14	1	Saint-Girons	Loudenvielle	Richard Virenque (FRA)
2001	13	1	Foix	Pla d'Adet	Laurent Jalabert (FRA)
1999	15	1	Saint-Gaudens	Piau-Engaly	Kurt Van De Wouwer (BEL)
1993	16	2	Andorra	Pla d'Adet	Tony Rominger (SUI)
1979	1	1	Fleurance	Bagnères de Luchon	Jean-René Bernaudeau (FRA)
1976	14	2	Saint-Gaudens	Pla d'Adet	Pedro Torres (ESP)
1974	16	2	Seo de Urgel	Pla d'Adet	Domingo Perurena (ESP)
1973	13	1	Bourg-Madame	Bagnères de Luchon	Luis Ocaña (ESP)
1971	14	2	Revel	Bagnères de Luchon	José Manuel Fuente (ESP)
1969	16	2	Castelnaudary	Bagnères de Luchon	Raymond Delisle (FRA)
1967	16	2	Toulouse	Bagnères de Luchon	Fernando Manzanèque (ESP)
1966	11	1	Pau	Bagnères de Luchon	Marcello Mugnaini (ITA)
1964	15	2	Toulouse	Bagnères de Luchon	Raymond Poulidor (FRA)
1963	11	2	Bagnères-de-Bigorre	Bagnères de Luchon	Guy Ignolin (FRA)
1961	16	2	Toulouse	Superbagnères	Imerio Massignan (ITA)
1957	17	2	Ax-les-Thermes	Saint-Gaudens	Désiré Keteleer (BEL)
