= Peyragudes =

Ski station in France

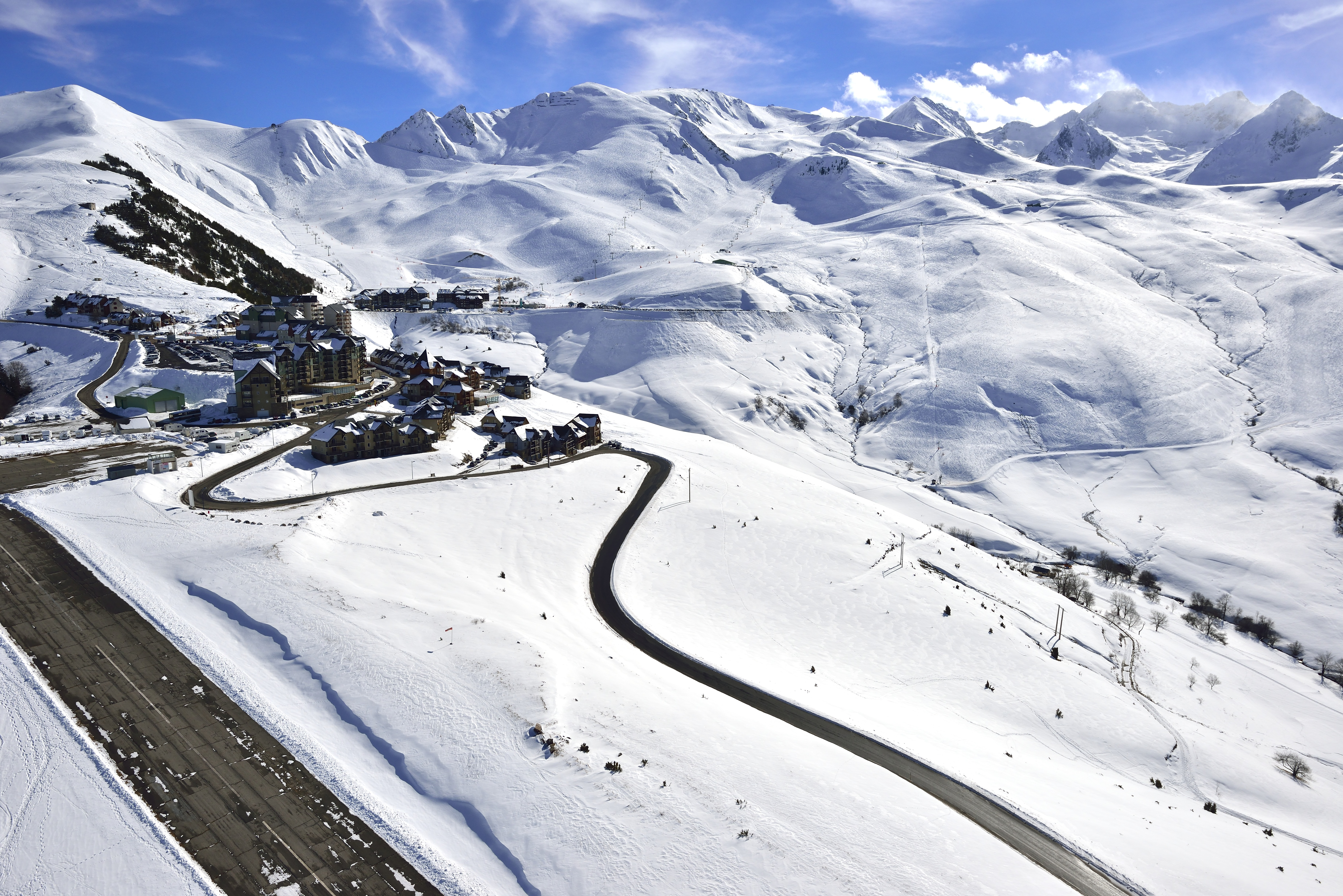
- A view of Peyresourde, Hautes-Pyrénées with a ski slope at the resort of Peyragudes.

- Location within France Location within Occitanie Location within Pyrenees
- Location: Gouaux-de-Larboust (Haute-Garonne), Germ (Hautes-Pyrénées)
- Nearest city: Bagnères-de-Luchon
- Coordinates: 42°47′24″N 0°26′42″E
- Top elevation: 2,400 m (7,874 ft)
- Base elevation: 1,590 m (5,217 ft)
- Trails: 51 total; 6 beginner; 23 easy; 18 intermediate; 4 difficult
- Longest run: 5 km (3.1 mi) La vallée blanche
- Lift system: 17 lifts
- Terrain parks: 2
- Snowmaking: 230 snow cannons
- Website: www.n-py.com/en/peyragudes/

Peyragudes is a large ski resort in the French Pyrenees, situated in the departments of Hautes-Pyrénées and Haute-Garonne, in the Region of Occitanie.

The resort was created in 1988, when the Peyresourde and Agudes resorts were joined.

== Skiing ==
The resort is located on 2 sides of the same mountain, connected thru several lifts.

There are 18 ski lifts and 51 ski slopes:

- 6 green slopes
- 23 blue slopes
- 18 red slopes
- 4 black slopes

A major part of the resort is equipped with 230 snow-guns.

The Skyvall gondola, which cost €30m and opened in 2019, links Loudenvielle in the Vallee du Louron to the mountain village at Peyragudes.

== Cycling ==
The climb up to the ski-resort can be accessed from the D618 between Arreau and the Col de Peyresourde. The summit is situated at 1,605 m (5,266 ft).

The climb was used on the 2010 Route du Sud, when David Moncoutié was the first rider to cross the line, going on to win the whole race.

=== Tour de France ===
In 2012, Peyragudes was the finish of Stage 17 of the Tour de France. The summit of the climb for the purposes of the King of the Mountains was 1,000 m. before the end of the stage, at a height of 1,603 m (5,259 ft). First over the summit was Alejandro Valverde, who went on to win the stage, with Chris Froome and Bradley Wiggins 19 seconds behind. Romain Bardet won the stage in the 2017 Tour, while Aru took the yellow jersey from Chris Froome. In the 2022 Tour Brandon McNulty broke the entire GC group with the exception of teammate Tadej Pogačar, who won the stage, and Jonas Vingegaard who retained the yellow jersey after finishing second on the stage. In 2025, Peyragudes was the finish of a mountain time trial, Stage 13, won by Tadej Pogačar.

Year	Stage	Start of stage	Category	Stage winner	Yellow jersey
2025	13	Loudenvielle	1	Tadej Pogačar (SLO)	Tadej Pogačar (SLO)
2022	17	Saint-Gaudens	1	Tadej Pogačar (SLO)	Jonas Vingegaard (DEN)
2017	12	Pau	2	Romain Bardet (FRA)	Fabio Aru (ITA)
2012	17	Bagnères-de-Luchon	1	Alejandro Valverde (ESP)	Bradley Wiggins (GBR)

=== Other appearances in the Tour ===
The climb was also used in Stage 17 of the 2018 Tour de France, with Tanel Kangert first over the summit.

Year	Stage	Category	Start	Finish	Leader at the Summit
2018	17	1	Bagnères-de-Luchon	Saint-Lary-Soulan Col de Portet	Tanel Kangert (EST)
