= Col d'Agnes =

Mountain pass in the Pyrenees

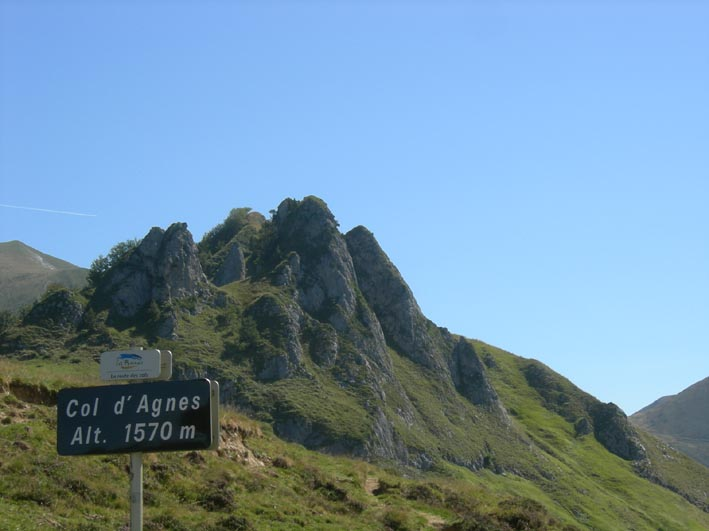

- Location within Pyrenees
- Elevation: 1,570 metres (5,150 ft)
- Traversed by: D8F

Third Approach
- Location: Ariège, France
- Range: Pyrenees
- Coordinates: 42°47′39″N 1°22′26″E

The Col d'Agnes (elevation 1,570 m (5,150 ft)) is a mountain pass in the French Pyrenees in the department of Ariège, between the communities of Aulus-les-Bains (west), Massat (north) and Vicdessos (east).

== Details of climb ==
Starting from Aulus-les-Bains, the climb is 10.2 km (6.3 mi) long. Over this distance, the climb is 826 m (2,710 ft) (an average of 8.1%), with the steepest sections at 10.6%.

Starting from Massat, the climb is 17.6 km (10.9 mi) long. Over this distance, the climb is 921 m (3,022 ft) (an average of 5.2%), with the steepest sections being at 8.2%. Approximately 4.0 km (2.5 mi) from the summit is the junction with the climb to the Port de Lers.

== Appearances in Tour de France ==
The Col d'Agnes was first used in the Tour de France in 1988, since when it has featured seven times, most recently in 2024, when the leader over the summit was Laurens De Plus.

Year	Stage	Category	Start	Finish	Leader at the summit
2024	15	1	Loudenvielle	Plateau de Beille	Laurens De Plus (BEL)
2017	13	1	Saint-Girons	Foix	Alberto Contador (ESP)
2011	14	1	Saint-Gaudens	Plateau de Beille	Sylvain Chavanel (FRA)
2009	8	1	Andorra la Vella	Saint-Girons	Mikel Astarloza (ESP)
2004	13	1	Lannemezan	Plateau de Beille	Michael Rasmussen (DEN)
1995	14	3	Saint-Orens-de-Gameville	Guzet-Neige	Marco Pantani (ITA)
1988	14	1	Blagnac	Guzet-Neige	Robert Millar (GBR)
