= Port de Lers =

Mountain pass in the French Pyrenees

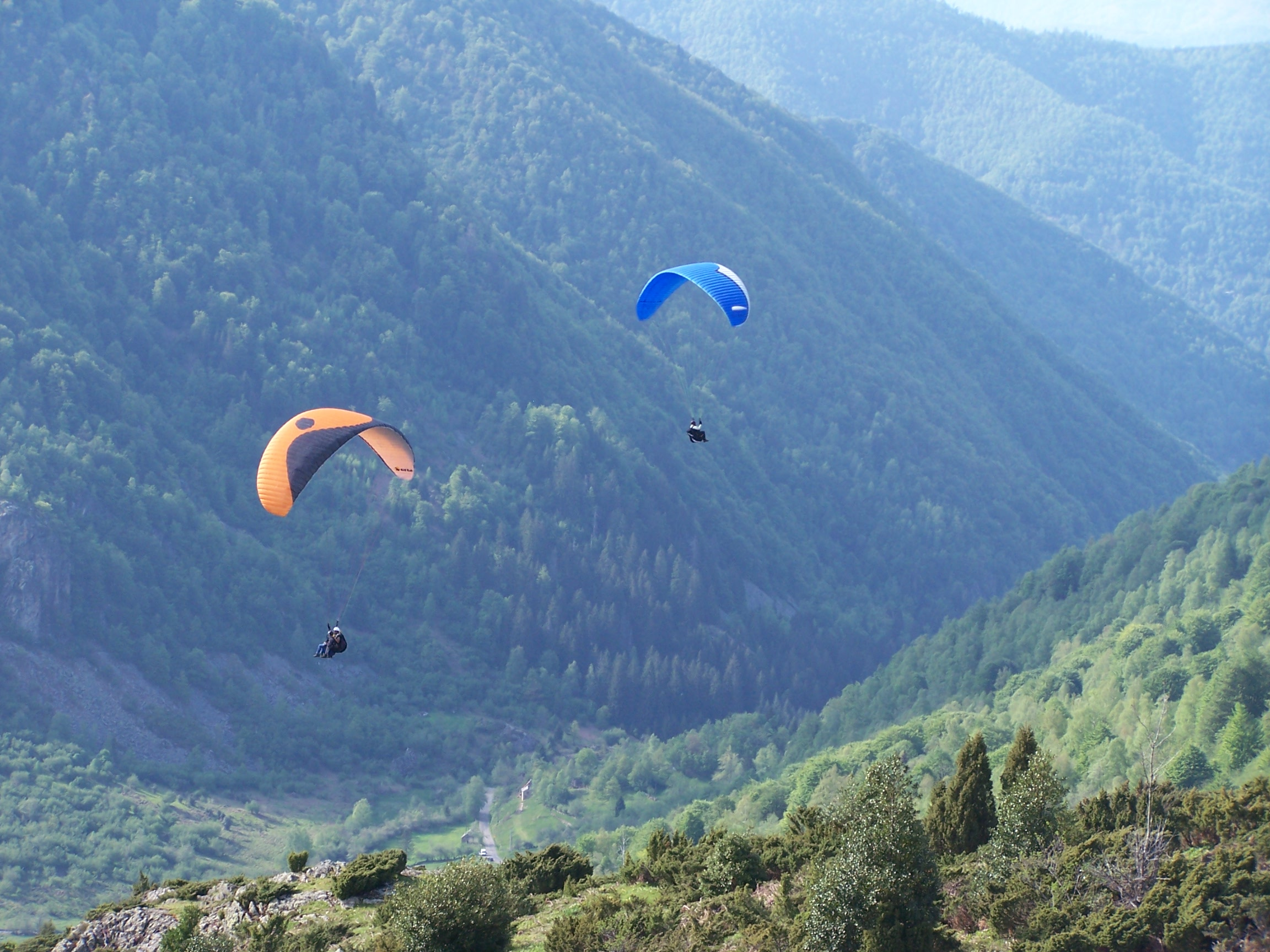

- Location within Pyrenees
- Elevation: 1,517 metres (4,977 ft)
- Traversed by: D18

Third Approach
- Location: Ariège, France
- Range: Pyrenees
- Coordinates: 42°48′23″N 1°24′41″E

The Port de Lers (or Port de l'Hers or Port de Massat) (elevation 1,517 m (4,977 ft)) is a mountain pass in the French Pyrenees in the department of Ariège, between the communities of Aulus-les-Bains (west), Massat (north) and Vicdessos (east).

== Details of climb ==
Starting from Vicdessos, the climb is 11.5 km (7.1 mi) long. Over this distance, the climb is 807 m (2,648 ft) (an average of 7.0%), with the steepest section being at 10.9%.

Starting from Massat, the climb is 16.6 km (10.3 mi) long. Over this distance, the climb is 868 m (2,848 ft) (an average of 5.2%), with the steepest sections being at 8.9%.

== Appearances in Tour de France ==
The Port de Lers was first used in the Tour de France in 1995, since when it has featured seven times, most recently in 2024.

Year	Stage	Category	Start	Finish	Leader at the summit*
2022	16	1	Carcassonne	Foix	Simon Geschke (GER)
2019	15	1	Limoux	Foix Prat d'Albis	Romain Bardet (FRA)
2015	12	1	Lannemezan	Plateau de Beille	Michał Kwiatkowski (POL)
2012	14	1	Limoux	Foix	Sergio Paulinho (POR)
2011	14	3	Saint-Gaudens	Plateau de Beille	Gorka Izagirre (ESP)
2004	13	3	Lannemezan	Plateau de Beille	Michael Rasmussen (DEN)
1995	14	2	Saint-Orens-de-Gameville	Guzet-Neige	Marco Pantani (ITA)
