= Aulus-les-Bains =

Commune in Occitanie, France

Aulus-les-Bains Aulús (Occitan)
- Commune
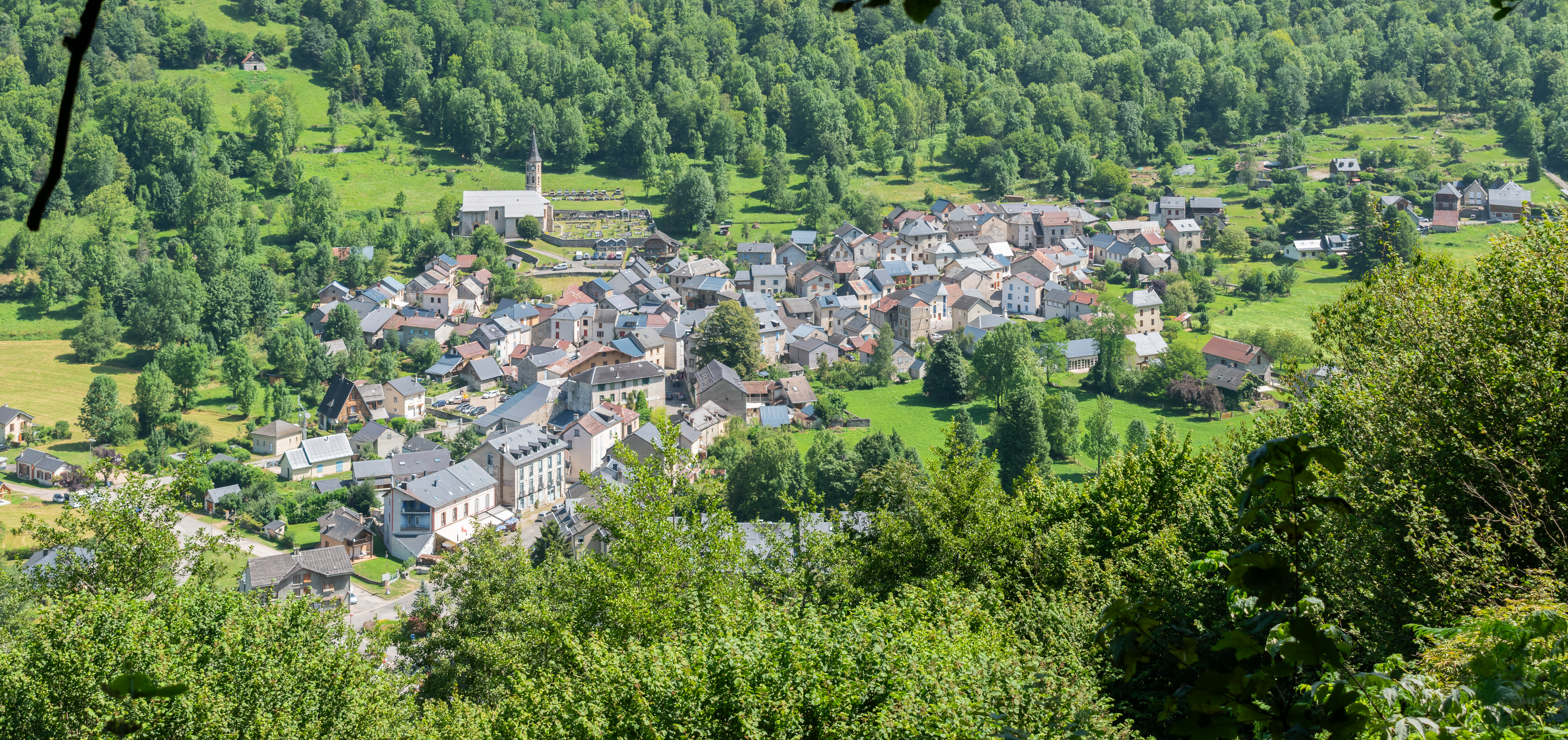
- A view of the village of Aulus-les-Bains
- Location of Aulus-les-Bains
- Location within France Location within Occitanie
- Coordinates: 42°47′30″N 1°20′19″E
- Country: France
- Region: Occitania
- Department: Ariège
- Arrondissement: Saint-Girons
- Canton: Couserans Est
- Intercommunality: CC Couserans - Pyrénées

Government
  - Mayor (2020–2026): Patrick Boyer
- Area^{1}: 52.24 km^{2} (20.17 sq mi)
- Elevation: 750 m (2,460 ft)
- Highest elevation: 2,698 m (8,852 ft)
- Lowest elevation: 719 m (2,359 ft)
- Population (2023): 132
  - Density: 2.53/km^{2} (6.54/sq mi)
- Time zone: UTC+01:00 (CET)
  - Summer (DST): UTC+02:00 (CEST)
- INSEE/Postal code: 09029 /09140
- ^{1} French Land Register data, which excludes lakes, ponds, glaciers > 1 km^{2} (0.386 sq mi or 247 acres) and river estuaries.

Aulus-les-Bains (French pronunciation: [olys le bɛ̃]; lit. 'Aulus-the-Baths'; Occitan: Aulús) is a rural commune in the Ariège department in the Occitanie region of Southwestern France. It is in the Pyrenees on the Spanish border.

== Geography ==
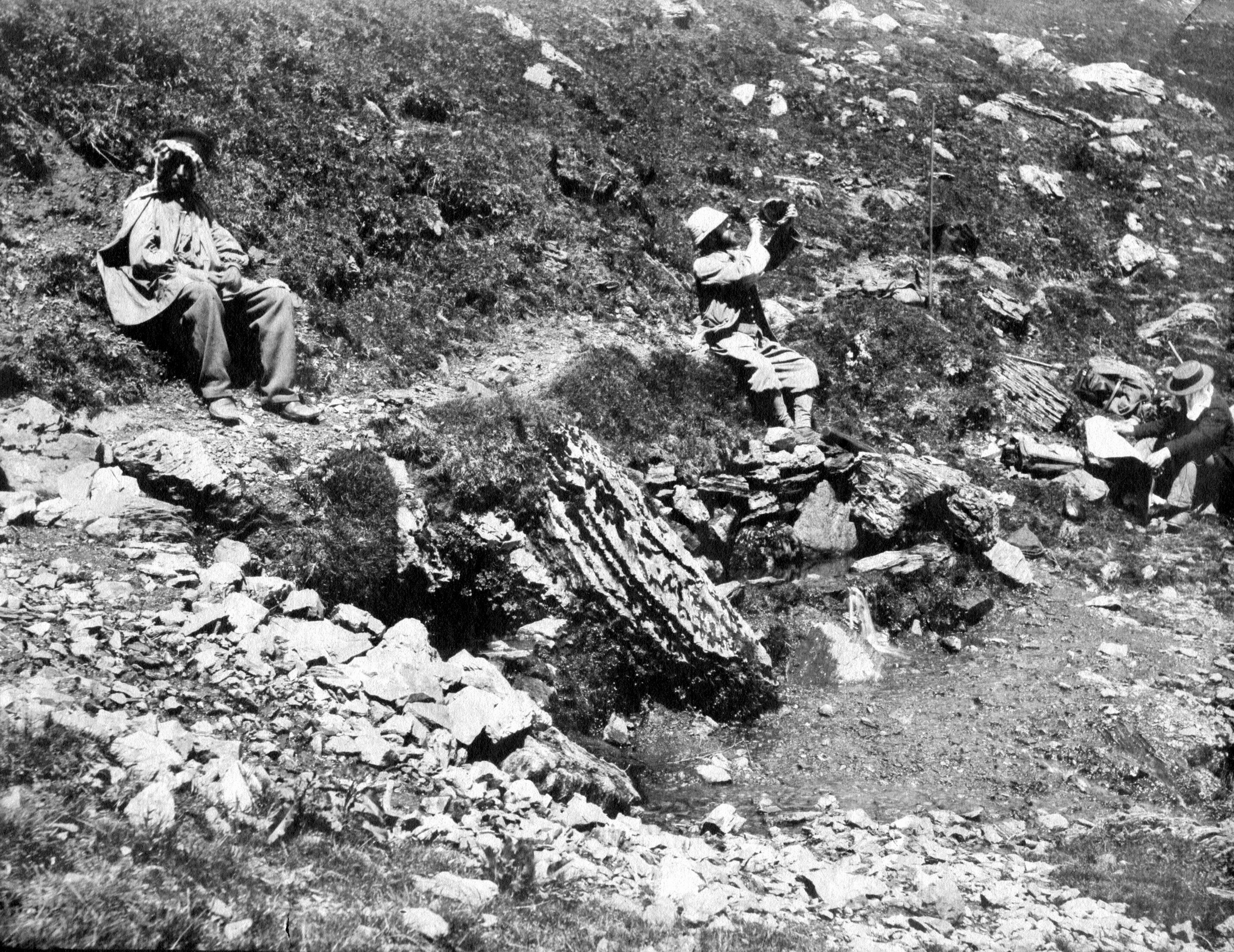
The Col de Saleich in 1882

Aulus-les-Bains is located at the head of the Garbet river valley and beneath the Guzet-Neige ski resort some 35 km south-east of Saint-Girons and 25 km south-west of Tarascon-sur-Ariège at an altitude of 750 metres. Access to the commune is by the D8F road which branches from the D3 west of the commune and follows a tortuous route to the village before continuing by an even more tortuous route to join the D18 in the east. The D32 road comes from Ercé in the north to the village. The commune is mountainous and heavily forested with large areas in the south above the snow line.

The village is best known for its thermal springs and spa complex. There are several Belle Époque buildings with some still offering hotel accommodation. The village is very popular in winter for skiing and in the summer for walking and cycling. The local beauty spot and waterfall, the Cascade d'Ars, is a one-hour walk from the village. Cyclists can climb the Col de Latrappe or the Col d'Agnes directly from the village.

There are two holiday cottages: the Presbytère and the Goulue. Other local amenities include a bar/café, a pizzeria/health food restaurant, a tobacconist, a mini supermarket, a post office, and a butcher shop.

The Garbet river rises in the commune and gathers a very large number of tributaries in the commune as it flows north-west through the village to join the Salat north of Oust. There are numerous streams and ponds throughout the commune which all flow to join the Garbet.

== History ==
From the early 19th century, Aulus expanded as a health spa, frequented by "invalids of love" or "young people with shameful illnesses". This came about after a syphilitic army lieutenant had found some relief in its waters, probably because they counteracted the effects of the mercury then used to treat syphilis patients. The lieutenant's regiment spread the word: by 1849 Aulus had three hotels, a new bridge and an avenue of acacia trees to attract visitors.

During the Second World War in January 1942, 686 foreign Jews were sent to stay in Aulus. The Vichy government arrested 174 Polish Jews out of this group on 26 August 1942 and took them to Le Vernet. A further 100 were added from elsewhere in the department then they were all taken to Drancy on the way to Auschwitz. On arrival all but 44 were killed and only 26 survived the war. A further 266 Jews were arrested by the Germans on 9 January 1943 and only 83 survived from this group.

== Administration ==
List of mayors

From	To	Name	Party	Position
2001	2008	Jean-Michel Rossell	PS	
2008	2020	Michel Veyssière	PCF	

== Demography ==
The inhabitants of the commune are known as Aulusiens or Aulusiennes in French.

Historical population

Year	Pop.	±% p.a.
1793	1,021	—
1800	884	−2.04%
1806	1,026	+2.51%
1821	991	−0.23%
1831	897	−0.99%
1836	1,003	+2.26%
1841	1,011	+0.16%
1846	953	−1.17%
1851	958	+0.10%
1856	898	−1.29%
1861	925	+0.59%
1866	910	−0.33%
1872	951	+0.74%
1876	954	+0.08%
1881	875	−1.71%
1886	893	+0.41%
1891	798	−2.22%
1896	707	−2.39%
1901	739	+0.89%

Year	Pop.	±% p.a.
1906	724	−0.41%
1911	742	+0.49%
1921	613	−1.89%
1926	602	−0.36%
1931	606	+0.13%
1936	590	−0.53%
1946	482	−2.00%
1954	402	−2.24%
1962	292	−3.92%
1968	227	−4.11%
1975	182	−3.11%
1982	208	+1.93%
1990	210	+0.12%
1999	189	−1.16%
2007	205	+1.02%
2012	181	−2.46%
2017	158	−2.68%
2023	132	−2.95%

Source: EHESS and INSEE

== Economy ==
Aulus-les-Bains is a hydro-mineral resort whose sources, which were known to the Romans, found fame at the beginning of the 19th century. Today Aulus-les-Bains is still best known for its hot springs. With syphilis now curable, the village markets itself as the "Cholesterol Spa". The water from the springs is also used to treat ailments such as urinary problems, arthritis, and some disorders of the nervous system. The village is also the point of departure for the many hikers wishing to visit the surrounding valleys and mountains.

== Sites and monuments ==
- The Hot springs.
- The Cascade d'Ars (Ars waterfall), which is 246 metres high and has three levels. There are many walks going up to and around the waterfall taking from three and a half hours to nine hours ranging from easy to very difficult.
- The Parish Church contains three items that are registered as historical objects:
  - A Collection Plate (16th century)
  - A Collection Plate depicting the Annunciation (16th century)
  - A Chalice with Paten (19th century)

The GR10 hiking trail passes through the commune from the Lac d'Izourt in the south-west to Ustou in the west.

== See also ==
- Communes of the Ariège department
- Hot springs
- List of spa towns in France
- Couserans
