= Guzet-Neige =

Ski resort in Aulus-les-Bains, Ariège, France

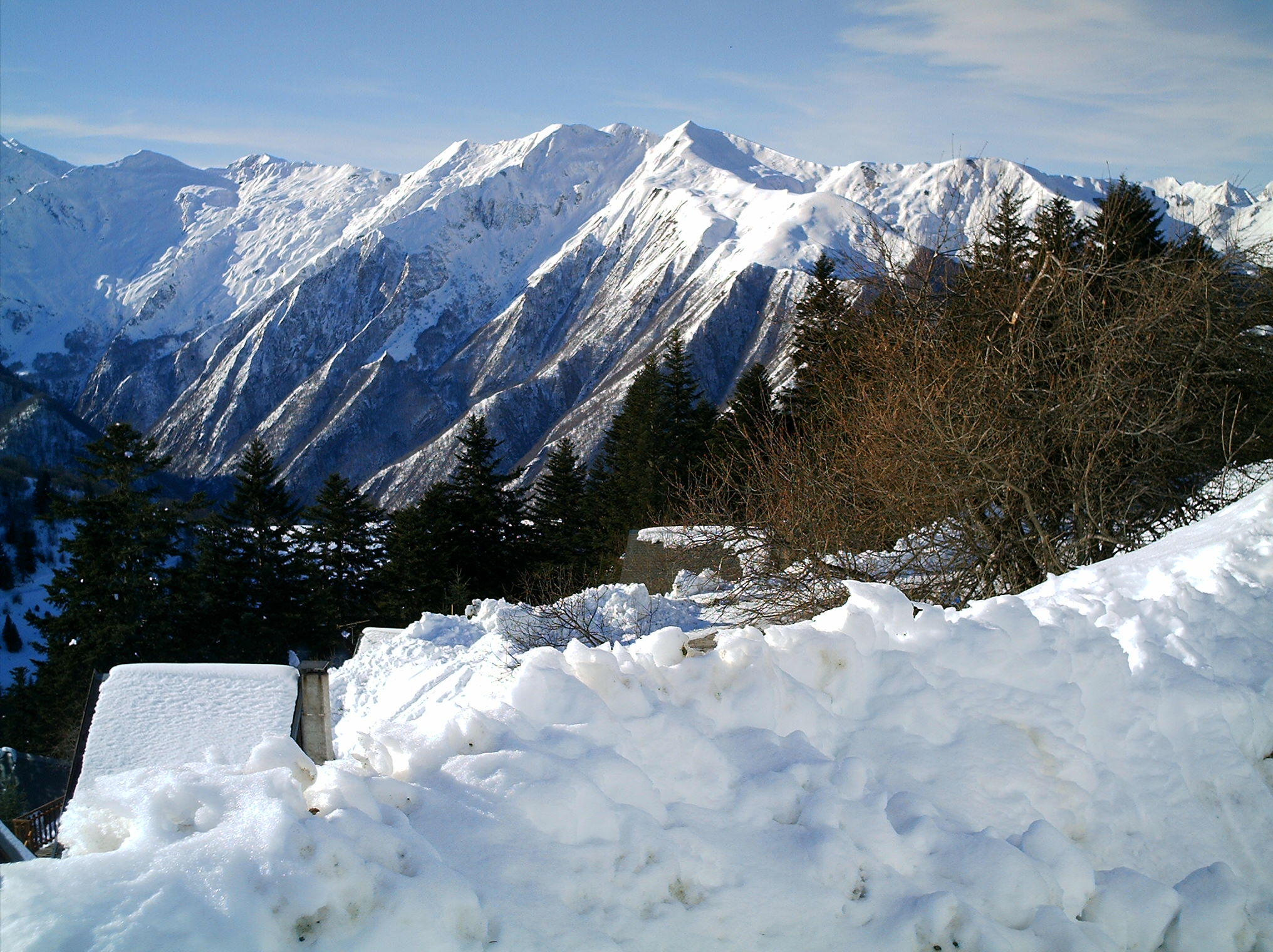
- The Pyrenees seen from Guzet

- Location within France Location within Occitanie Location within Pyrenees
- Location: Aulus-les-Bains, Ariège
- Nearest city: Saint-Girons
- Coordinates: 42°47′14″N 1°17′55″E
- Top elevation: 2,100 m (6,890 ft)
- Base elevation: 1,100 m (3,609 ft)
- Trails: 32
- Lift system: 14
- Website: Official website

Guzet-Neige is a ski resort situated in the Haute-Ariège area of the Ariège department in the French Pyrénées. The climb to the ski station has been used three times as a stage finish in the Tour de France.

== Location ==
Guzet is located between 1,100 m (3,600 ft) and 2,100 m (6,900 ft) in altitude, in Ariège in the heart of the Pyrenees.

The resort is divided into three areas:

- Guzet 1400
- Prat-Mataou
- Le Freychet

The resort can be accessed from two directions: from the west through the Ustou valley and east through the Col de Latrape from Aulus-les-Bains.

== Facilities ==
There are 33 km (21 mi) of lift served runs and 3 km (1.9 mi) of cross country trails. The resort features a snowpark.

== Cycling ==
=== Details of the climb ===
The climb starts from the village of Seix on the River Salat and shares most of its route with that to the Col de Latrape from where there is a turn-off onto the D68, 1.0 km (0.6 mi) from the summit. From here there is a further 6 km (3.7 mi) climb to the ski station. In total from Seix, the climb is 23.7 km (14.7 mi) long. Over this distance, you climb 1,010 m (3,310 ft) at an average gradient of 4.3%, although the final section averages about 8%.

=== Tour de France stage finishes ===
The climb to the ski station has been used three times as a stage finish in the Tour de France, most recently in 1995. It is ranked a first category climb.

Year	Stage	Category	Start of stage	Distance (km)	Height of finish (m)	Stage winner	Yellow jersey
1995	14	1	St-Orens-de-Gameville	164	1510	Marco Pantani (ITA)	Miguel Indurain (ESP)
1988	14	1	Blagnac	163	1515	Massimo Ghirotto (ITA)	Pedro Delgado (ESP)
1984	11	1	Pau	226.5	1480	Robert Millar (GBR)	Vincent Barteau (FRA)
