= Col de Latrape =

Mountain pass in the French Pyrenees

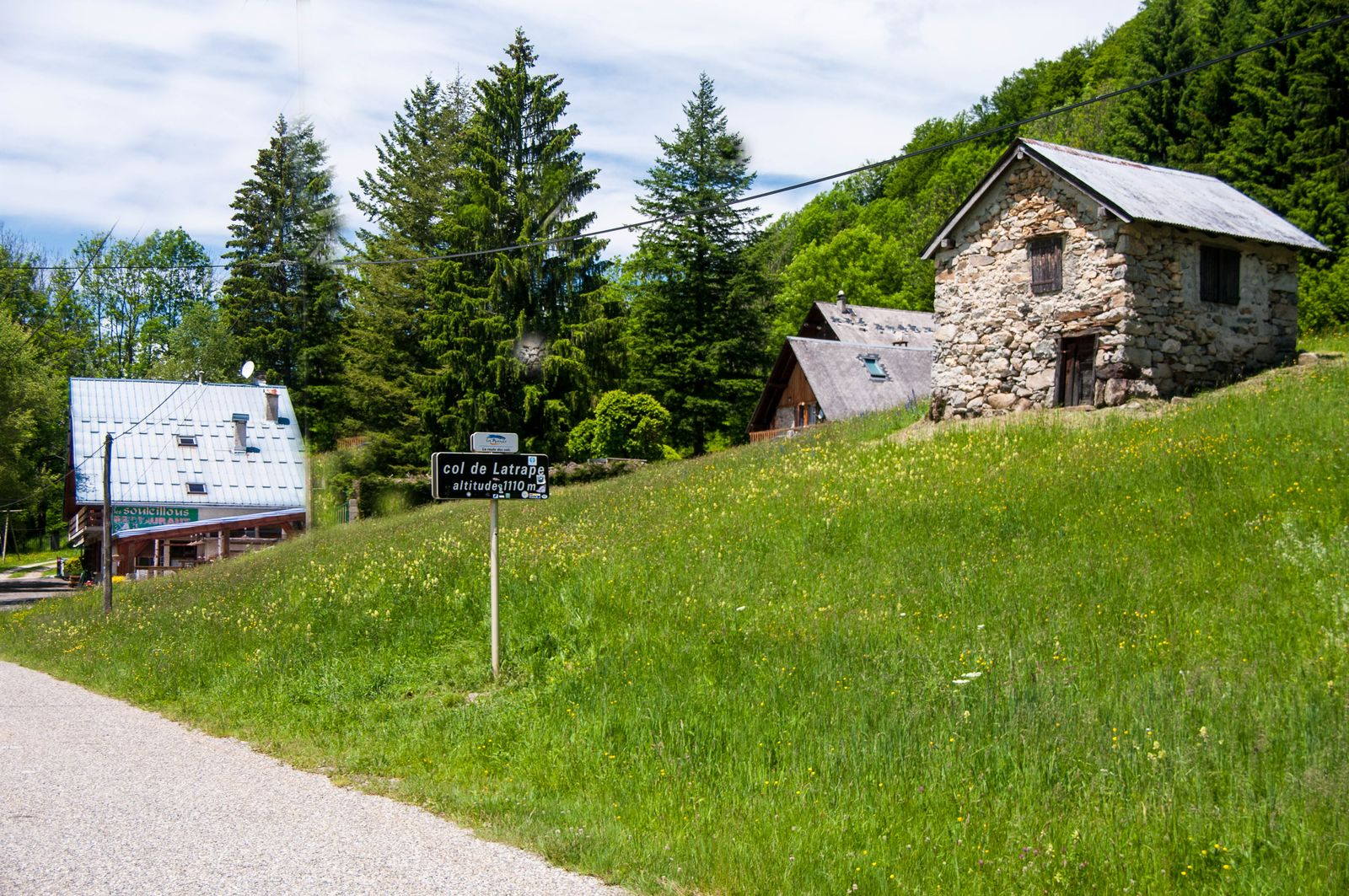

- Location within Pyrenees
- Elevation: 1,111 metres (3,645 ft)
- Traversed by: D8F

Third Approach
- Location: Ariège, France
- Range: Pyrenees
- Coordinates: 42°47′44″N 1°18′51″E

The Col de Latrape (elevation 1,111 m (3,645 ft)) is a mountain pass in the French Pyrenees in the department of Ariège, between the communities of Aulus-les-Bains (east) and Ustou (west).

== Details of climb ==
Starting from Aulus-les-Bains, the climb is 5.0 km (3.1 mi) long. Over this distance, the climb is 368 m (1,207 ft) (an average gradient of 7.4%), with the steepest sections being at 10.0%.

Starting from Sérac d'Ustou, the climb is 5.9 km (3.7 mi) long. Over this distance, the climb is 423 m (1,388 ft) (an average gradient of 7.2%), with the steepest section being at 11%.

== Appearances in Tour de France ==
The Col de Latrape was first used in the Tour de France in 1956, since when it has featured eight times, most recently in 2017, when the leader over the summit was Alessandro De Marchi.

Year	Stage	Category	Start	Finish	Leader at the summit
2017	13	1	Saint-Girons	Foix	Alessandro De Marchi (ITA)
2011	14	2	Saint-Gaudens	Plateau de Beille	Sandy Casar (FRA)
2004	13	2	Lannemezan	Plateau de Beille	Sylvain Chavanel (FRA)
2003	14	2	Saint-Girons	Loudenvielle	Christophe Mengin (FRA)
1995	14	3	Saint-Orens-de-Gameville	Guzet-Neige	Marco Pantani (ITA)
1988	14	2	Blagnac	Guzet-Neige	Robert Millar (GBR)
1984	11	2	Pau	Guzet-Neige	Jean-René Bernaudeau (FRA)
1956	13	3	Bagnères-de-Luchon	Toulouse	Charly Gaul (LUX)
