= List of spa towns in France =

The following is a list of spa towns in France.

- Aix-en-Provence
- Aix-les-Bains
- Allevard
- Amélie-les-Bains-Palalda
- Amnéville
- Ardèche
- Aulus-les-Bains
- Ax-les-Thermes
- Bad Niederbronn
- Bagnères-de-Bigorre
- Bagnères-de-Luchon
- Bagnoles
- Bagnoles de l'Orne
- Bagnols-les-Bains
- Bains-les-Bains
- Barbazan
- Barbotan-les-Thermes
- Bourbon-l'Archambault
- Bourbon-Lancy
- Bourbonne-les-Bains
- Cambo-les-Bains
- Challes-les-Eaux
- Châteauneuf-les-Bains
- Châtel-Guyon
- Chaudes-Aigues
- Contrexéville
- Dax
- Digne-les-Bains
- Divonne-les-Bains
- Eaux-Bonnes
- Eaux-Chaudes
- Enghien-les-Bains
- Eugénie-les-Bains
- Evaux-les-Bains
- Évian-les-Bains
- Jonzac
- Latoue
- La Bourboule
- Le Boulou
- Le Monêtier-les-Bains
- Lons-le-Saunier
- Luxeuil-les-Bains
- Luz-Saint-Sauveur
- Molitg-les-Bains
- Mont-Dore
- Néris-les-Bains
- Plombières-les-Bains
- Prats-de-Mollo-la-Preste
- Rennes-les-Bains
- Rochefort
- Royat
- Sail-les-Bains
- Saint-Amand-les-Eaux
- Saint-Lary-Soulan
- Saint-Nectaire
- Saint-Paul-lès-Dax
- Salies-de-Béarn
- Salies-du-Salat
- Saujon
- Thonon-les-Bains
- Ussat
- Uriage-les-Bains
- Vals-les-Bains
- Vernet-les-Bains
- Vichy
- Vittel

== See also ==
- List of spa towns
