= Barbazan, Haute-Garonne =

Barbazan
- Commune
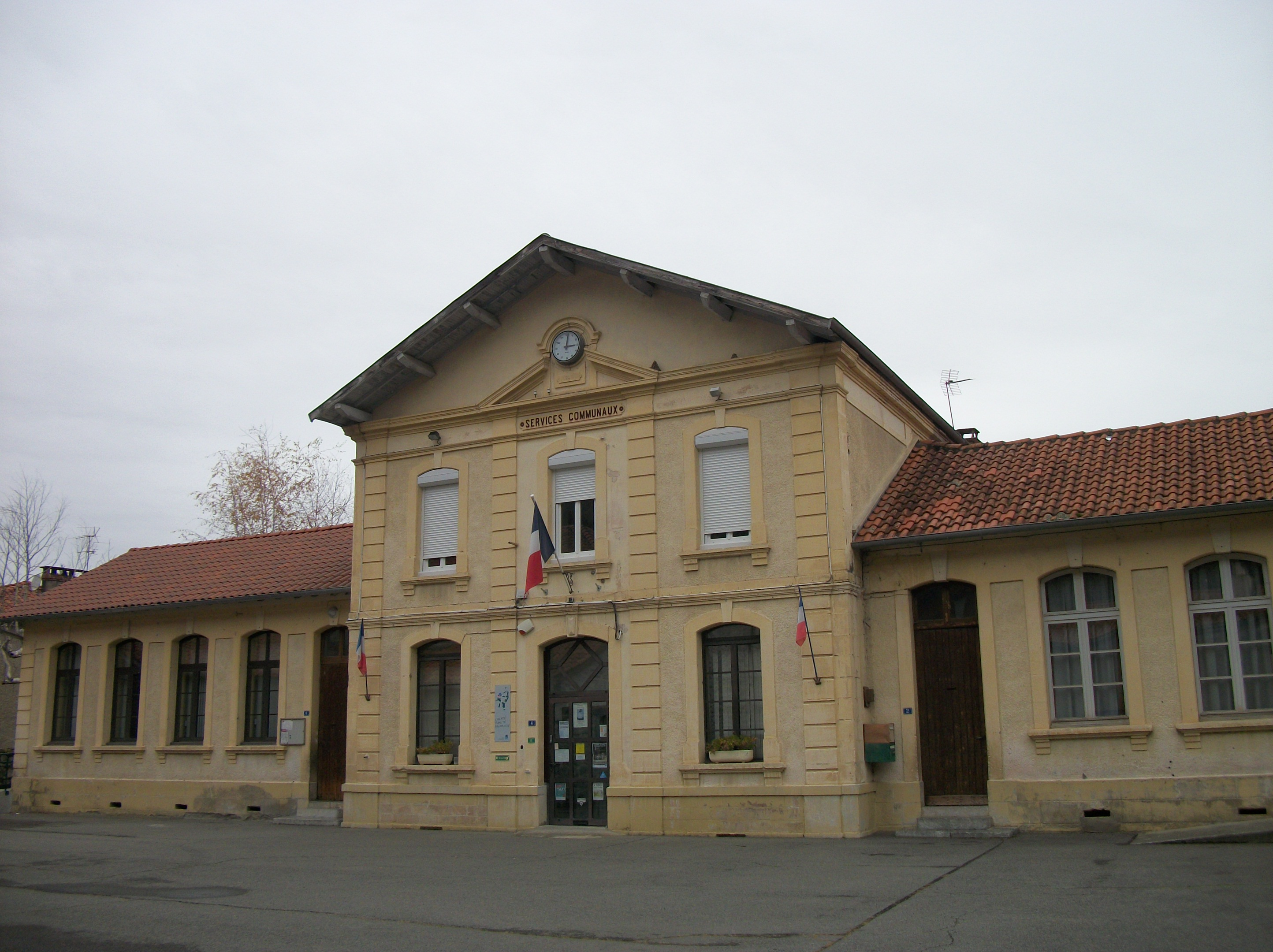
- The town hall in Barbazan

- Coat of arms
- Location of Barbazan
- Location within France Location within Occitanie
- Coordinates: 43°02′00″N 0°37′26″E
- Country: France
- Region: Occitania
- Department: Haute-Garonne
- Arrondissement: Saint-Gaudens
- Canton: Bagnères-de-Luchon
- Intercommunality: Pyrénées Haut-Garonnaises

Government
  - Mayor (2020–2026): Michelle Stradere
- Area^{1}: 6.05 km^{2} (2.34 sq mi)
- Elevation: 450 m (1,480 ft)
- Highest elevation: 890 m (2,920 ft)
- Lowest elevation: 439 m (1,440 ft)
- Population (2023): 512
  - Density: 84.6/km^{2} (219/sq mi)
- Time zone: UTC+01:00 (CET)
  - Summer (DST): UTC+02:00 (CEST)
- INSEE/Postal code: 31045 /31510
- ^{1} French Land Register data, which excludes lakes, ponds, glaciers > 1 km^{2} (0.386 sq mi or 247 acres) and river estuaries.

Barbazan (French pronunciation: [baʁbazɑ̃]; Occitan: Barbasan) is a commune in the Haute-Garonne department in the Occitanie region of south-western France.

== Geography ==
Barbazan is a Spa town in the Comminges region located some 13 km south-west of Saint-Gaudens and 12 km north of Cierp-Gaud. The western border of the commune is also the departmental border between Haute-Garonne and Hautes-Pyrénées. Access to the commune is by Route nationale N125 which comes from the end of the A645 autoroute and passes down the western side of the commune south to Ore. The D26E road comes from Labroquère in the north-west and passes through the north of the commune ending in the village. The D26 comes from Valcabrère in the west and passes through the village continuing to Sauveterre-de-Comminges in the east. The D33D and the D33L go south from the village to join the N125. The commune has extensive forests in the east with some farmland in the west.

The Garonne river forms most of the western border of the commune as it flows north, passing through Toulouse, to eventually join the Dordogne to form the Gironde estuary at Bordeaux. Lake Barbazan, north-west of the village at 452 m above sea level, is of glacial origin. It is surrounded by moraine deposits: sub-glacial moraine from Cumania and rocky outcrops of moraine west of the Lake. The Ruisseau de Corp flows west from the lake to join the Garonne.

=== Heraldry ===
| Arms of Barbazan | Blazon: Vert, 3 jets of water Argent issuant from a fountain with antique base of Or on a wave Argent mouvant from base; in chief parti per pale: at 1 Gules with 4 otelles Argent addorsed saltrirewise, at 2 Azure with a cross of Or. |

== Administration ==
List of Successive Mayors

Mayors from the French Revolution to 1937

| From | To | Name |
|---|---|---|
| 1792 | 1800 | Mathieu Monserbe |
| 1800 | 1809 | Joseph Dulac |
| 1809 | 1815 | Bertrand Monserie |
| 1815 | 1818 | Pierre Lapeyrade |
| 1818 | 1822 | Jean-Jacques Marie d'Astorg |
| 1822 | 1828 | Nicolas Bourbon |
| 1828 | 1832 | Jean-Marie Bon |
| 1832 | 1840 | Jean Dulac |
| 1840 | 1843 | Jean Pujole |
| 1843 | 1847 | Jean-Mathieu Descaillaux |
| 1847 | 1848 | Jean Mondon |
| 1848 | 1852 | Gilles Mondon |
| 1852 | 1871 | Jean-Louis Gilles Mondon |
| 1871 | 1890 | Théophile Dulac |
| 1890 | 1924 | Romain Dombernard |
| 1924 | 1937 | Mathieu Allemane |

Mayors from 1937

| From | To | Name |
|---|---|---|
| 1937 | 1944 | Baptiste Foucadet |
| 1944 | 1947 | André Casteix |
| 1947 | 1947 | Bertrand Fourcade |
| 1947 | 1957 | Pierre Pujole |
| 1957 | 1960 | Jacques Vollant |
| 1960 | 1972 | Paul Bertrand |
| 1972 | 1977 | Henri Fontagneres |
| 1977 | 1985 | Georges Guichard |
| 1985 | 1989 | Jean Serny |
| 1989 | 2014 | Henri Galy |
| 2014 | 2026 | Michelle Stradere |

== Demography ==
The inhabitants of the commune are known as Barbazanais or Barbazanaises in French.

Historical population

| Year | Pop. | ±% p.a. |
|---|---|---|
| 1793 | 425 | — |
| 1821 | 485 | +0.47% |
| 1846 | 555 | +0.54% |
| 1872 | 516 | −0.28% |
| 1901 | 431 | −0.62% |
| 1926 | 381 | −0.49% |
| 1946 | 371 | −0.13% |
| 1954 | 438 | +2.10% |
| 1962 | 525 | +2.29% |

| Year | Pop. | ±% p.a. |
|---|---|---|
| 1968 | 516 | −0.29% |
| 1975 | 406 | −3.37% |
| 1982 | 386 | −0.72% |
| 1990 | 351 | −1.18% |
| 1999 | 378 | +0.83% |
| 2007 | 445 | +2.06% |
| 2012 | 450 | +0.22% |
| 2017 | 490 | +1.72% |
| 2023 | 512 | +0.73% |

Source: EHESS and INSEE

== Sites and monuments ==
Barbazan has two sites that are registered as historical monuments:

- The Chateau of Bagen (1544)
- The Flower Garden in the Chateau of Bagen on the D26 road

Other sites of interest

- The Thermal baths
- The Lake
- The Church of Saint-Michel

== Notable people linked to the commune ==
- Jacques-Marie d'Astorg (1752-1822), Count of Astorg and Roquépine, Baron of Montégut, French soldier in the 18th and 19th centuries.

== See also ==
- Communes of the Haute-Garonne department
- List of spa towns in France
- Thermal baths
