= 2004 Tour de France, Stage 10 to Stage 20 =

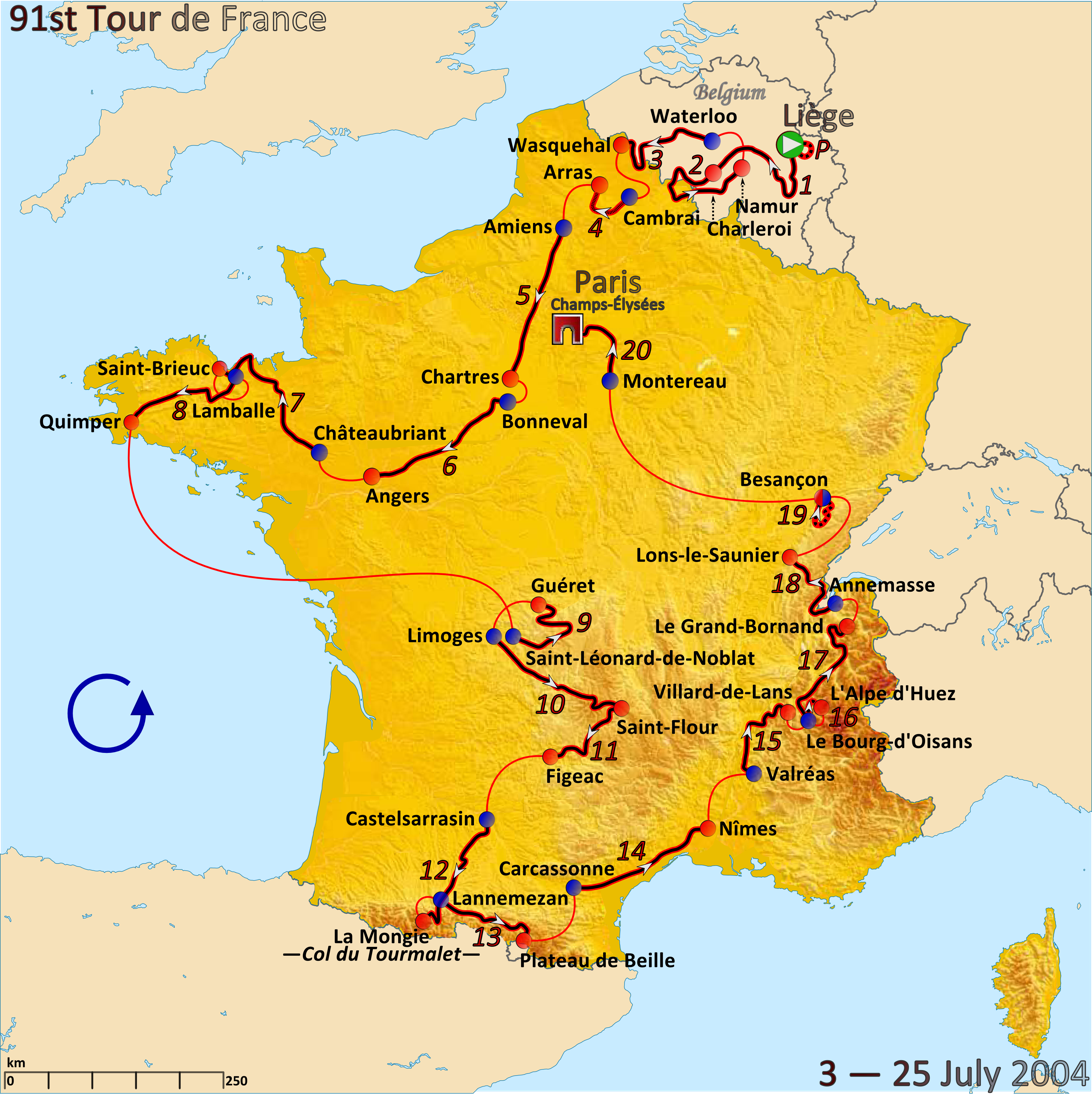
Route of the 2004 Tour de France

The 2004 Tour de France was the 91st edition of Tour de France, one of cycling's Grand Tours. The Tour began in Liège, Belgium with a prologue individual time trial on 3 July and Stage 10 occurred on 14 July with a hilly stage from Limoges. The race finished on the Champs-Élysées in Paris on 25 July.

== Stage 10 ==
14 July 2004 — Limoges to Saint-Flour, 237 km (147.3 mi)

This 237 km stage was the longest of the 2004 Tour and the first to feature some serious climbs. Cutting through the departments of Haute-Vienne, Corrèze, and Cantal, and so part of the Massif Central, the big climbs were the cat-1 Col du Pas de Peyrol (Le Puy Mary) and the cat-2's the Col de Néronne and the Col de Prat-de-Bouc. On Bastille Day the predominantly French crowd was willing a French stage win, a feat achieved thirteen times since 1947, the last being Laurent Jalabert in 2001. The day was calm, warm and sunny. 172 riders started the stage.

The race began with small attacks in the first few kilometres but the peloton kept control until around Linards, at 35 km. A group of four riders, including veteran climber Richard Virenque, managed to pull out a small lead, they were joined by seven other riders just before the first sprint, but their lead was just 20 seconds. After the small lead group swelled to eighteen riders US Postal came to the front of the peloton and all the escapees except Virenque and Axel Merckx (son of Eddy) were soon back in the main group. The determined duo slowly pulled away, extending their advantage to 60 seconds by the 50 km mark. Joly and Kroon tried to join them but fell short and after they returned to the peloton the pace of the main group fell slightly, USP reduced their efforts, and the two leaders pulled further ahead. After the second climb (Col de Lestards, 67 km raced, cat-3) they were almost four minutes ahead.

Virenque and Merckx pulled further ahead over the third climb and by the second intermediate sprint were 8'05" clear. At the summit of the Cote de Chalvignac (126.5 km raced) they had over nine minutes in hand. Brioches la Boulangere were doing most of the work at the front of the peloton. On the Col de Néronne the lead was 10'40", Virenque had taken maximum points on every climb.

On the ascent of the cat-1 Col du Pas de Peyrol, after 135 km together, Merckx was dropped by Virenque. His lead over the peloton was down to 9'00" and he had about half-a-minute over Merckx. On the descent there were two nasty crashes out of the peloton by Matthias Kessler and Sebastian Hinault.

Over the eighth summit (Col d'Entremont) Virenque had a minute over Merckx and had maintained his advantage over the peloton. On the final major summit, the Col de Prat de Bouc, with 31.5 km to the finish, Virenque led Merckx by over four minutes and had 7'45" over the rest. Merckx was caught by the peloton on the descent and then dropped by the peloton (he finished a minute down on the peloton).

Virenque held his lead, the peloton did not make a major effort to catch him, and he came in over five minutes ahead. He had been out in front for 202 km and raced the final 62 km alone. It was his seventh career Tour stage victory, his maximum points haul was enough to put him in the polka-dot jersey for the first time in 2004 and his win also jumped him 51 places in the classement général.

Stage 10 result

Rank	Rider	Team	Time
1	Richard Virenque (FRA)	Quick-Step–Davitamon	6h 00' 24"
2	Andreas Klöden (GER)	T-Mobile Team	+ 5' 19"
3	Erik Zabel (GER)	T-Mobile Team	+ 5' 19"
4	Francisco Mancebo (ESP)	Illes Balears	+ 5' 19"
5	Thomas Voeckler (FRA)	Brioches La Boulangère	+ 5' 19"
~~6~~	~~Lance Armstrong (USA)~~	~~U.S. Postal Service~~	~~+ 5' 19"~~
7	Georg Totschnig (AUT)	Gerolsteiner	+ 5' 19"
8	Kim Kirchen (LUX)	Fassa Bortolo	+ 5' 19"
9	Michele Scarponi (ITA)	Domina Vacanze	+ 5' 19"
10	Pietro Caucchioli (ITA)	Alessio–Bianchi	+ 5' 19"

General classification after stage 10

Rank	Rider	Team	Time
1	Thomas Voeckler (FRA)	Brioches La Boulangère	42h 42' 14"
2	Stuart O'Grady (AUS)	Cofidis – Le Crédit par Téléphone	+ 3' 00"
3	Sandy Casar (FRA)	Française des Jeux	+ 4' 13"
4	Richard Virenque (FRA)	Quick-Step–Davitamon	+ 6' 52"
5	Jakob Piil (DEN)	Team CSC	+ 7' 31"
~~6~~	~~Lance Armstrong (USA)~~	~~U.S. Postal Service~~	~~+ 9' 35"~~
7	Erik Zabel (GER)	T-Mobile Team	+ 9' 58"
8	José Azevedo (POR)	U.S. Postal Service	+ 10' 04"
9	José Enrique Gutiérrez (ESP)	Phonak Hearing Systems	+ 10' 09"
10	Francisco Mancebo (ESP)	Illes Balears	+ 10' 18"

== Stage 11 ==
15 July 2004 — Saint-Flour to Figeac, 164 km (101.9 mi)

This 164 km stage remained in hilly territory but featured no climbs as severe as Stage 10. There were just five categorised climbs, the largest being the cat-2 Côte de Montsalvy at 99.5 km. The day was warm, road-side temperatures reached as high as 45 °C and there was little wind.

After the usual early escape attempts the peloton split on the very first climb at 6.5 km, although they were soon back together. Very quickly after the regrouping Jens Voigt and Juan Antonio Flecha broke away, they were joined by four others, but never got further than 20 seconds ahead and soon rejoined the US Postal led peloton. Minutes after that group had been swept up seven more riders tried to get away, they were soon caught and again another four riders made an attack. This group grew to seven before being caught on the second climb, the Cote de Therondels.

On the short descent, after 56 km raced, David Moncoutié and Egoi Martínez made a break, they were soon joined by Flecha and the trio managed to push their lead above 30 seconds and then further. In the 15 km to the third climb they established a 1'50" gap. Their advantage reached 7'50" at 90 km raced, fell back over the fourth climb, the Cote de Montsalvy, before rising again to over eight minutes.

The leaders took an eight-minute advantage into the final 10 km and the attacks began from within the trio. Flecha had an attempt and was caught, but then Moncoutie broke away and the remaining pair didn't chase. His lead grew by 60 seconds in the next 4 km and he cruised over the line for his first Tour victory 2'15" ahead of his two chasers, who both looked decidedly jaded. Moncoutié is a native of the region and the first régionaux winner since 1974. The peloton came in six minutes after Moncoutié and there were no changes to the top ten.

Stage 11 result

Rank	Rider	Team	Time
1	David Moncoutié (FRA)	Cofidis – Le Crédit par Téléphone	3h 54' 58"
2	Juan Antonio Flecha (ESP)	Fassa Bortolo	+ 2' 15"
3	Egoi Martínez (ESP)	Euskaltel–Euskadi	+ 2' 17"
4	Thor Hushovd (NOR)	Crédit Agricole	+ 5' 58"
5	Erik Zabel (GER)	T-Mobile Team	+ 5' 58"
6	Robbie McEwen (AUS)	Lotto–Domo	+ 5' 58"
7	Paolo Bettini (ITA)	Quick-Step–Davitamon	+ 5' 58"
8	Danilo Hondo (GER)	Gerolsteiner	+ 5' 58"
~~9~~	~~Lance Armstrong (USA)~~	~~U.S. Postal Service~~	~~+ 5' 58"~~
10	Stuart O'Grady (AUS)	Cofidis – Le Crédit par Téléphone	+ 5' 58"

General classification after stage 11

Rank	Rider	Team	Time
1	Thomas Voeckler (FRA)	Brioches La Boulangère	46h 43' 10"
2	Stuart O'Grady (AUS)	Cofidis – Le Crédit par Téléphone	+ 3' 00"
3	Sandy Casar (FRA)	Française des Jeux	+ 4' 13"
4	Richard Virenque (FRA)	Quick-Step–Davitamon	+ 6' 52"
5	Jakob Piil (DEN)	Team CSC	+ 7' 43"
~~6~~	~~Lance Armstrong (USA)~~	~~U.S. Postal Service~~	~~+ 9' 35"~~
7	Erik Zabel (GER)	T-Mobile Team	+ 9' 58"
8	José Azevedo (POR)	U.S. Postal Service	+ 10' 04"
9	José Enrique Gutiérrez (ESP)	Phonak Hearing Systems	+ 10' 09"
10	Francisco Mancebo (ESP)	Illes Balears	+ 10' 18"

== Stage 12 ==
16 July 2004 — Castelsarrasin to La Mongie, 197.5 km (122.7 mi)

This 197.5 km stage was the first to enter the Pyrenees. The route had no categorised climbs until the 160 km mark. The two climbs were both cat-1, the Col d'Aspin was included in a stage for the 66th time and the finish was at La Mongie (third inclusion), a ski resort at the top of another cat-1 climb. There were expectations that Armstrong would make a move on this stage, as he had won a previous stage to La Mongie in 2002. It was another sunny, cloudless day at the start but as the riders approached the mountains there was heavy rain.

A break by four riders in the first two minutes was allowed to get away. Counter-attacks were swallowed up by the US Postal and Brioches la Boulangere led peloton, but the foursome built their lead over the long approach to the Col d'Aspin to a maximum of just over four minutes. With about 100 km raced the peloton started to cut into the leaders' advantage and caught them three km from the start of the ascent of the Col d'Aspin.

US Postal led the peloton up the mountain, setting a pace that dropped many non-climbers. There were several attacks on the ascent and the riders were led over the summit by Mickael Rasmussen, who had a 5" lead over Christophe Moreau, Virenque was third. Despite the wet road the descent was rapid and broke up the peloton.

The rain stopped as the riders approached the final climb. Rasmussen took a 30" lead into the ascent but he was soon caught by a group of eleven, including Armstrong and Mayo. Having dropped Ullrich, Armstrong was quick to attack himself and the group pulled away from Ullrich. Sastre was still ahead of the group and with 3 km to the finish he was chased by Armstrong, who was accompanied by Ivan Basso. Armstrong caught and dropped Sastre and led Basso under the 1 km mark. In the final metres Basso put on a spurt, Armstrong did not respond, and Basso won the stage. Mayo came in 1'09" down, Ullrich 2'30", and Tyler Hamilton 3'27". Other riders staggered in over the next 100 minutes. Thomas Voeckler finished 3'59" behind but stayed in yellow (he has now spent longer in yellow than any Frenchman since 1992), Armstrong rose to second in the classement général.

Stage 12 result

Rank	Rider	Team	Time
1	Ivan Basso (ITA)	Team CSC	5h 03' 58"
~~2~~	~~Lance Armstrong (USA)~~	~~U.S. Postal Service~~	~~s.t.~~
3	Andreas Klöden (GER)	T-Mobile Team	+ 20"
4	Francisco Mancebo (ESP)	Illes Balears	+ 24"
5	Carlos Sastre (ESP)	Team CSC	+ 33"
6	Óscar Pereiro (ESP)	Phonak Hearing Systems	+ 50"
7	Denis Menchov (RUS)	Illes Balears	+ 59"
8	Michele Scarponi (ITA)	Domina Vacanze	+ 1' 02"
9	Iban Mayo (ESP)	Euskaltel–Euskadi	+ 1' 03"
10	Santos González (ESP)	Phonak Hearing Systems	+ 1' 03"

General classification after stage 12

Rank	Rider	Team	Time
1	Thomas Voeckler (FRA)	Brioches La Boulangère	51h 51' 07"
~~2~~	~~Lance Armstrong (USA)~~	~~U.S. Postal Service~~	~~+ 5' 24"~~
3	Sandy Casar (FRA)	Française des Jeux	+ 5' 50"
4	Richard Virenque (FRA)	Quick-Step–Davitamon	+ 6' 20"
5	Andreas Klöden (GER)	T-Mobile Team	+ 6' 33"
6	Ivan Basso (ITA)	Team CSC	+ 6' 33"
7	Francisco Mancebo (ESP)	Illes Balears	+ 6' 43"
8	Jakob Piil (DEN)	Team CSC	+ 6' 53"
9	Santos González (ESP)	Phonak Hearing Systems	+ 7' 23"
10	Carlos Sastre (ESP)	Team CSC	+ 8' 11"

== Stage 13 ==
17 July 2004 — Lannemezan to Plateau de Beille, 205.5 km (127.7 mi)

This was the second day in the Pyrenees. The 205.5 km stage had five major climbs, including the 15.9 km hors categorie climb to the finish at Plateau-de-Beille, the first such climb on the 2004 Tour. The other main climbs were the Col de Portet d'Aspet, the Col de la Core, the Col de Latrape, and the Col d'Agnes. The Col d'Agnes actually has a steeper gradient than the final climb (average 8.2% to average 7.8%) but is shorter at 9.8 km. Many mountains on this stage have been included before, notably the Col du Portet d'Aspet, this is its 51st inclusion since 1910 including the tragic occasion in 1995 when Fabio Casartelli crashed on the descent and later died. On another bright and hot day 165 riders started the stage.

The usual early break, this time by fifteen riders, was quickly chased down by the US Postal team. Haimar Zubeldia was dropped early and abandoned the Tour, a short while later Denis Menchov abandoned and before the first climb Gerrit Glomser dropped out. Another smaller group quickly sprang away after the capture of the first break, and held a slim advantage for a few more kilometres before being swept up. Again there was another break, this time by Sylvain Chavanel and Jens Voigt. The pair broke away, and as the peloton slowed, built up a reasonable lead – heading the peloton by 3'06" over the first climb, with Michael Rasmussen caught in no-man's-land 70" behind the leaders.

On the second climb, the Col du Portet d'Aspet, Rasmussen caught and stayed with the two leaders and the three went over the summit with a lead of 3'50" over the peloton. A substantial group (a grupetto) were dropped on the ascent by the main peloton. As the riders passed through the feedzone Tyler Hamilton abandoned.

The trio extended their lead on the flatter part and had a 5'00" advantage over the Col de Core. On the fourth climb they pulled out a little further and the chasing peloton dropped many riders including Iban Mayo and Thomas Voeckler. On the Col d'Agnes Voigt and Rasmussen dropped Chavanel and in the twenty-strong chasing group the five US Postal riders started to push harder. At the summit the leading pair's advantage over the peloton had fallen to 3'40", Voeckler was a further minute back, with Mayo a surprising 14'05" adrift.

Over the Port de Lers Voigt stopped working and simply followed Rasmussen over the summit, 3'50" ahead. Behind them the chasers joined up, forming a thirty-strong group including Voeckler, who had fought his way back. At the start of the final climb Voigt and Rasmussen held an insufficient 3'10" lead.

On the final climb US Postal led the chasers. The group quickly started losing riders, again including Voeckler. By the time the gap had been cut to 1'30" the chasing group had shrunk to just eleven, notables were Armstrong, Ullrich, Leipheimer, Mancebo and stage 12's winner Basso. By the time Voight was caught, Armstrong's group was just four – himself, teammate José Azevedo, Georg Totschnig and Ivan Basso. Rasmussen was quickly caught too, but Armstrong powered on and shed Totschnig and both the previous leaders. Azevedo led the other two into the last 8 km before falling away, by 5 km to go the two leaders were 45" ahead of Totschnig (Azevedo was 1'40" behind). Basso led out the last kilometre but in the final 100 m Armstrong passed him for his first stage win of the 2004 Tour and his 19th career Tour victory. Ullrich came in 2'42" later, Voeckler was 13th at 4'42" and kept the yellow jersey by 22".

Stage 13 result

Rank	Rider	Team	Time
~~1~~	~~Lance Armstrong (USA)~~	~~U.S. Postal Service~~	~~6h 04' 38"~~
2	Ivan Basso (ITA)	Team CSC	s.t.
3	Georg Totschnig (AUT)	Gerolsteiner	+ 1' 05"
4	Andreas Klöden (GER)	T-Mobile Team	+ 1' 27"
5	Francisco Mancebo (ESP)	Illes Balears	+ 1' 27"
6	Jan Ullrich (GER)	T-Mobile Team	+ 2' 42"
7	José Azevedo (POR)	U.S. Postal Service	+ 2' 50"
8	Christophe Moreau (FRA)	Crédit Agricole	+ 2' 51"
9	Pietro Caucchioli (ITA)	Alessio–Bianchi	+ 2' 51"
10	Gilberto Simoni (ITA)	Saeco	+ 3' 43"

General classification after stage 13

Rank	Rider	Team	Time
1	Thomas Voeckler (FRA)	Brioches La Boulangère	58h 00' 27"
~~2~~	~~Lance Armstrong (USA)~~	~~U.S. Postal Service~~	~~+ 22"~~
3	Ivan Basso (ITA)	Team CSC	+ 1' 39"
4	Andreas Klöden (GER)	T-Mobile Team	+ 3' 18"
5	Francisco Mancebo (ESP)	Illes Balears	+ 3' 28"
6	Georg Totschnig (AUT)	Gerolsteiner	+ 6' 08"
7	José Azevedo (POR)	U.S. Postal Service	+ 6' 43"
8	Jan Ullrich (GER)	T-Mobile Team	+ 7' 01"
9	Pietro Caucchioli (ITA)	Alessio–Bianchi	+ 7' 59"
10	Sandy Casar (FRA)	Française des Jeux	+ 8' 29"

== Stage 14 ==
18 July 2004 — Carcassonne to Nîmes, 192.5 km (119.6 mi)

After the Pyrenees comes a 192.5 km stage without a single categorised climb. The flat stages after mountains often have long breakaway winners as the main competitors recuperate. On a hot and hazy day with a slight breeze 160 riders started the stage.

The race started with a flurry of attacks, all were quickly closed down – including a twenty-man break. US Postal and Voeckler's 'Bakery Boys' led the peloton. After 30 km raced a four strong attack built up a little lead, the group pushed their lead out to 60 seconds over the first sprint but were pulled back to barely 15" soon afterwards. With the leaders so close there were plenty of riders trying to cross the gap and they were caught at the 65 km mark by a Rabobank lead peloton.

There were a number of other attacks, including a twelve-man attempt, but Lotto and Quickstep closed them down, the overall pace was high – over 45 km/h average in the second hour. However, around 15:00, with 100 km raced, ten men made it away, coalescing from a number of smaller breaks – they were a sufficient mix of teams (nine!) and low places (the best placed was 43rd) that there was no team wanting to chase. The ten quickly pulled away, gaining a 2'50" advantage in the next 15 minutes of racing. After an hour in the lead and with 50 km to go their advantage was 10'50". The peloton was 'policed' by Brioches la Boulangere and the ten men kept working together into the final 15 kilometres, leading by 13'19".

As the finish approached, cooperation among the ten fell apart and a series of attacks and chases split and rejoined the group. With around 5 km to go Aitor Gonazalez attacked for a second time and tore away into a 15" lead as the others hesitated, only Nicolas Jalabert and Christophe Mengin chased and they couldn't catch him. Gonzalez won, Jalabert grabbed second and the others drifted in. The peloton came in 14'12" back, with sprinters points going down to 25th place there was a strongly contested sprint, with McEwen just beating Hushovd for 11th place and one extra point over his green jersey rival. The top ten in the classement général was completely unchanged. Monday, July 19, is a rest day before a return to mountains – the Alps.

Stage 14 result

Rank	Rider	Team	Time
1	Aitor González (ESP)	Fassa Bortolo	4h 18' 32"
2	Nicolas Jalabert (FRA)	Phonak Hearing Systems	+ 25"
3	Christophe Mengin (FRA)	Française des Jeux	+ 25"
4	Pierrick Fédrigo (FRA)	Crédit Agricole	+ 29"
5	Peter Wrolich (AUT)	Gerolsteiner	+ 31"
6	Marc Lotz (NED)	Rabobank	+ 31"
7	Igor González de Galdeano (ESP)	Liberty Seguros	+ 31"
8	Santiago Botero (COL)	T-Mobile Team	+ 37"
9	Iñigo Landaluze (ESP)	Euskaltel–Euskadi	+ 41"
10	Egoi Martínez (ESP)	Euskaltel–Euskadi	+ 43"

General classification after stage 14

Rank	Rider	Team	Time
1	Thomas Voeckler (FRA)	Brioches La Boulangère	62h 33' 11"
~~2~~	~~Lance Armstrong (USA)~~	~~U.S. Postal Service~~	~~+ 22"~~
3	Ivan Basso (ITA)	Team CSC	+ 1' 39"
4	Andreas Klöden (GER)	T-Mobile Team	+ 3' 18"
5	Francisco Mancebo (ESP)	Illes Balears	+ 3' 28"
6	Georg Totschnig (AUT)	Gerolsteiner	+ 6' 08"
7	José Azevedo (POR)	U.S. Postal Service	+ 6' 43"
8	Jan Ullrich (GER)	T-Mobile Team	+ 7' 01"
9	Pietro Caucchioli (ITA)	Alessio–Bianchi	+ 7' 59"
10	Sandy Casar (FRA)	Française des Jeux	+ 8' 29"

== Stage 15 ==
20 July 2004 — Valréas to Villard-de-Lans, 180.5 km (112.2 mi)

This 180.5 km stage was the first in the Alps, and it was all up or down. There were seven categorised climbs, including four in the final 50 km with the additional cat-2 rise to the finish. The biggest climbs were the 10.7 km of the cat-2 Col des Limouches, the 12 km climb of the cat-1 Col de l'Echarasson and the 10.3 km up the cat-2 Col de Chalimont. The day was hot and sunny as 158 riders started the stage (Mayo and Piil abandoned, Piil was injured while Mayo was simply disgusted with his form).

As on other mountain stages with a flat(ish) start an early break was allowed to get away. Nine riders led over the first two climbs, chasing them down split the peloton – leaving a sixty-strong group lagging a minute behind. After the breakaway was caught another sprang away – a group of, eventually, 15 riders led by over 3'30" on the third climb. The group included Stuart O'Grady who raced away to win the points of the second intermediate sprint.

On the long climb up the Col de l'Echarasson, while the leaders were slowly caught, Ullrich attempted his own break, leading Armstrong by 40" as he went over the summit. He pulled further away over the Col de Carri but as Jens Voigt dropped back from his break-away group to assist Ivan Basso in defending his 2nd overall spot against Ullrich's attack, Armstrong's group quickly caught Ullrich before the sixth climb. Rasmussen and Virenque were only 50" ahead.

Armstrong's group caught everyone, and chased down a break by Leipheimer, on the ascent of the Col de Chalimont. Thomas Voeckler was over seven minutes back. On the final climb to the finish the leading group was still nine strong, with 1 km to go it was down to Armstrong, Basso, Klöden, and Ullrich. In the final sprint Armstrong beat Basso, claiming his 20th stage victory and the yellow jersey. Voeckler came in 9'27" down.

Stage 15 result

Rank	Rider	Team	Time
~~1~~	~~Lance Armstrong (USA)~~	~~U.S. Postal Service~~	~~4h 40' 30"~~
2	Ivan Basso (ITA)	Team CSC	s.t.
3	Jan Ullrich (GER)	T-Mobile Team	+ 3"
4	Andreas Klöden (GER)	T-Mobile Team	+ 6"
5	Levi Leipheimer (USA)	Rabobank	+ 13"
6	Richard Virenque (FRA)	Quick-Step–Davitamon	+ 48"
7	Michael Rasmussen (DEN)	Rabobank	+ 49"
8	José Azevedo (POR)	U.S. Postal Service	+ 53"
9	Jens Voigt (GER)	Team CSC	+ 1' 04"
10	Carlos Sastre (ESP)	Team CSC	+ 1' 24"

General classification after stage 15

Rank	Rider	Team	Time
~~1~~	~~Lance Armstrong (USA)~~	~~U.S. Postal Service~~	~~67h 13' 43"~~
2	Ivan Basso (ITA)	Team CSC	+ 1' 25"
3	Andreas Klöden (GER)	T-Mobile Team	+ 3' 22"
4	Francisco Mancebo (ESP)	Illes Balears	+ 5' 39"
5	Jan Ullrich (GER)	T-Mobile Team	+ 6' 54"
6	José Azevedo (POR)	U.S. Postal Service	+ 7' 34"
7	Georg Totschnig (AUT)	Gerolsteiner	+ 8' 19"
8	Thomas Voeckler (FRA)	Brioches La Boulangère	+ 9' 28"
9	Pietro Caucchioli (ITA)	Alessio–Bianchi	+ 10' 10"
10	Levi Leipheimer (USA)	Rabobank	+ 10' 58"

== Stage 16 ==
21 July 2004 — Le Bourg-d'Oisans to Alpe d'Huez, 15.5 km (9.6 mi) (ITT)

This 15.5 km stage was an individual time trial, including the 13.9 km up the twenty-one hairpin bends of the famous hors categorie L'Alpe d'Huez. The mountain had been included in the Tour on over 20 occasions, first in 1952. The stage was dedicated to Italian cyclist Marco Pantani, who had died earlier in 2004. Pantani had set the ascent time record of 36' 50" in the 1995 Tour de France, measured from 13.8 km below the summit. Starting in reverse order of standings, 157 riders raced the stage. It was sunny and warm, with light cloud cover.

Lance Armstrong won, passing Ivan Basso on the road. The huge number of spectators, some estimated over 750,000, seemed to impede the later riders, particularly as the first part of the course was wholly open, and many riders found themselves spat on by their detractors as they struggled to beat their way through the crowd. It would later be revealed that Armstrong had received death threats the day before this stage – something that would have been all too easy to carry out given the open course. Although much looked forward to, the stage was regarded by many as something of a disappointment due to the unmanageability of the crowds.

Stage 16 result

Rank	Rider	Team	Time
~~1~~	~~Lance Armstrong (USA)~~	~~U.S. Postal Service~~	~~39' 41"~~
2	Jan Ullrich (GER)	T-Mobile Team	+ 1' 01"
3	Andreas Klöden (GER)	T-Mobile Team	+ 1' 41"
4	José Azevedo (POR)	U.S. Postal Service	+ 1' 45"
5	Santos González (ESP)	Phonak	+ 2' 11"
6	Giuseppe Guerini (ITA)	T-Mobile Team	+ 2' 11"
7	Vladimir Karpets (RUS)	Illes Balears–Banesto	+ 2' 15"
8	Ivan Basso (ITA)	Team CSC	+ 2' 23"
9	David Moncoutié (FRA)	Cofidis	+ 2' 23"
10	Carlos Sastre (ESP)	Team CSC	+ 2' 27"

General classification after stage 16

Rank	Rider	Team	Time
~~1~~	~~Lance Armstrong (USA)~~	~~U.S. Postal Service~~	~~67h 53' 24"~~
2	Ivan Basso (ITA)	Team CSC	+ 3' 48"
3	Andreas Klöden (GER)	T-Mobile Team	+ 5' 03"
4	Jan Ullrich (GER)	T-Mobile Team	+ 7' 55"
5	José Azevedo (POR)	U.S. Postal Service	+ 9' 19"
6	Francisco Mancebo (ESP)	Illes Balears–Banesto	+ 9' 20"
7	Georg Totschnig (AUT)	Gerolsteiner	+ 11' 34"
8	Carlos Sastre (ESP)	Team CSC	+ 13' 52"
9	Pietro Caucchioli (ITA)	Alessio–Bianchi	+ 14' 08"
10	Levi Leipheimer (USA)	Rabobank	+ 15' 04"

== Stage 17 ==
22 July 2004 — Le Bourg-d'Oisans to Le Grand-Bornand, 204.5 km (127.1 mi)

On this, the last big mountain stage, the drama started early on the Col de la Madeleine, the highest climb in the Tour, as a group led by Giberto Simoni was caught just before the summit by Richard Virenque, who gave Simoni a tight chase for the mountain points and for the five thousand Euro prize earmarked for the winner of that climb. Simoni managed to edge it out, though, taking the sprint.

As the stage wore on, US Postal led the peloton with typical skill, until the final climb, where the lead break consisted of Armstrong, Ullrich, Basso, Klöden, and Armstrong's support rider Floyd Landis. At the top of the final climb, Armstrong told Landis to go for the win, and Landis took off, but was successfully ridden down by Ullrich, Basso, and Klöden. Klöden took off for the win pulling out what seemed to be a decisive gap in the last kilometre, but Armstrong, determined to compensate for his teammate Landis's loss of the stage, put in a devastating final sprint and got past him at the line for another stage win, and yet more of an advantage over his rivals in the GC.

Stage 17 result

Rank	Rider	Team	Time
~~1~~	~~Lance Armstrong (USA)~~	~~U.S. Postal Service~~	~~6h 11' 52"~~
2	Andreas Klöden (GER)	T-Mobile Team	s.t.
3	Jan Ullrich (GER)	T-Mobile Team	+ 1"
4	Ivan Basso (ITA)	Team CSC	+ 1"
5	Floyd Landis (USA)	U.S. Postal Service	+ 13"
6	Axel Merckx (BEL)	Lotto–Domo	+ 1' 01"
7	Levi Leipheimer (USA)	Rabobank	+ 1' 01"
8	Carlos Sastre (ESP)	Team CSC	+ 1' 02"
9	Michael Rasmussen (DEN)	Rabobank	+ 1' 02"
10	Georg Totschnig (AUT)	Gerolsteiner	+ 1' 02"

General classification after stage 17

Rank	Rider	Team	Time
~~1~~	~~Lance Armstrong (USA)~~	~~U.S. Postal Service~~	~~74h 04' 56"~~
2	Ivan Basso (ITA)	Team CSC	+ 4' 09"
3	Andreas Klöden (GER)	T-Mobile Team	+ 5' 11"
4	Jan Ullrich (GER)	T-Mobile Team	+ 8' 08"
5	José Azevedo (POR)	U.S. Postal Service	+ 10' 41"
6	Francisco Mancebo (ESP)	Illes Balears	+ 11' 45"
7	Georg Totschnig (AUT)	Gerolsteiner	+ 12' 56"
8	Carlos Sastre (ESP)	Team CSC	+ 15' 14"
9	Levi Leipheimer (USA)	Rabobank	+ 16' 25"
10	Pietro Caucchioli (ITA)	Alessio–Bianchi	+ 16' 33"

== Stage 18 ==
23 July 2004 — Annemasse to Lons-le-Saunier, 166.5 km (103.5 mi)

This stage was 166.5 km and the last in the mountains, it featured only one substantial climb, the cat-2 Col de la Faucille. With the time trial of Stage 19 looming this was a perfect chance for some lower placed riders to get away. The weather was hot and humid with a little rain at the start. Just 147 riders started the stage.

Some early drama was provided when Italian rider Filippo Simeoni, who has claimed that a doctor with ties to Armstrong had told him how to take performance-enhancing drugs without being caught, tried to join an early (and, as it would turn out, successful) break. Armstrong himself chased him down – unusual for a team leader and yellow jersey, especially since Simeoni was no threat to Armstrong in the overall standings. Armstrong, taking upon himself the self-styled role of 'boss' or 'le patron' of the peloton in the tradition of others in the past such as Bernard Hinault, forced his will and stayed with the break until they got two minutes ahead, at which point the rest of the break asked Simeoni to leave, which he did, followed by Armstrong. Simeoni harshly criticized Armstrong in the press following the stage, while Armstrong maintained that he was protecting the interests of the peloton, and accused Simeoni of trying to destroy professional cycling.

Left alone, and with US Postal controlling the peloton, the rest of the break rapidly pulled away. They held a lead of up to 7 minutes until the third climb, after which they moved even further ahead. Their advantage peaked at around 12'00". Into the final 20 km the group of six began to split as the attacks came. With 10 km to the finish Mercado and Garcia-Acosta attacked and made it away, they worked together into the final kilometre, Mercado just winning the sprint – his first ever stage win. The peloton came in 11'29" down led by Thor Hushovd.

Stage 18 result

Rank	Rider	Team	Time
1	Juan Miguel Mercado (ESP)	Quick-Step–Davitamon	4h 04' 03"
2	José Vicente García Acosta (ESP)	Illes Balears	s.t.
3	Dmitriy Fofonov (KAZ)	Cofidis – Le Crédit par Téléphone	+ 11"
4	Sébastien Joly (FRA)	Crédit Agricole	+ 11"
5	Marc Lotz (NED)	Rabobank	+ 11"
6	Juan Antonio Flecha (ESP)	Fassa Bortolo	+ 11"
7	Thor Hushovd (NOR)	Crédit Agricole	+ 11' 29"
8	Robbie McEwen (AUS)	Lotto–Domo	+ 11' 29"
9	Danilo Hondo (GER)	Gerolsteiner	+ 11' 29"
10	Stuart O'Grady (AUS)	Cofidis – Le Crédit par Téléphone	+ 11' 29"

General classification after stage 18

Rank	Rider	Team	Time
~~1~~	~~Lance Armstrong (USA)~~	~~U.S. Postal Service~~	~~78h 20' 28"~~
2	Ivan Basso (ITA)	Team CSC	+ 4' 09"
3	Andreas Klöden (GER)	T-Mobile Team	+ 5' 11"
4	Jan Ullrich (GER)	T-Mobile Team	+ 8' 08"
5	José Azevedo (POR)	U.S. Postal Service	+ 10' 41"
6	Francisco Mancebo (ESP)	Illes Balears	+ 11' 45"
7	Georg Totschnig (AUT)	Gerolsteiner	+ 12' 56"
8	Carlos Sastre (ESP)	Team CSC	+ 15' 14"
9	Levi Leipheimer (USA)	Rabobank	+ 16' 25"
10	Pietro Caucchioli (ITA)	Alessio–Bianchi	+ 16' 33"

== Stage 19 ==
24 July 2004 — Besançon, 55 km (34.2 mi) (ITT)

The final time trial held less suspense this year than it sometimes does, since Armstrong already had such a commanding lead, but Armstrong came in saying he was racing to win. The biggest questions coming in, however, were whether Jan Ullrich would be able to race fast enough to get himself a podium spot, and whether Thomas Voeckler, who managed to hold the yellow jersey for ten days, despite numerous predictions he'd lose it well before that, would hold onto the lead in the young riders classification, which he held with a 45-second lead.

Starting with the last place rider, Jimmy Casper, and ending with Armstrong, the riders ran the loop in and out of Besançon. For most of the race, US Postal riders held the fastest time, with Viatceslav Ekimov setting an early fast time, eventually beaten by Bobby Julich. Julich was eventually beaten by Floyd Landis, who held the fastest time until the last few riders came in, with Kloden, Ullrich, and Armstrong all beating him. Armstrong had the fastest time, coming in a full minute over his nearest rider, Ullrich. Ullrich ran an impressive time trial, but wasn't able to pull ahead of Basso, and will almost certainly finish the Tour in 4th place.

Voeckler, meanwhile, finally had his luck run out, finishing six minutes behind his nearest rival for the white jersey, Vladimir Karpets, who came in 8th in the time trial.

Stage 19 result

Rank	Rider	Team	Time
~~1~~	~~Lance Armstrong (USA)~~	~~U.S. Postal Service~~	~~1h 06' 49"~~
2	Jan Ullrich (GER)	T-Mobile Team	+ 1' 01"
3	Andreas Klöden (GER)	T-Mobile Team	+ 1' 27"
4	Floyd Landis (USA)	U.S. Postal Service	+ 2' 25"
5	Bobby Julich (USA)	Team CSC	+ 2' 48"
6	Ivan Basso (ITA)	Team CSC	+ 2' 50"
7	Jens Voigt (GER)	Team CSC	+ 3' 19"
8	Vladimir Karpets (RUS)	Illes Balears	+ 3' 33"
9	José Luis Rubiera (ESP)	U.S. Postal Service	+ 3' 40"
10	José Azevedo (POR)	U.S. Postal Service	+ 3' 49"

General classification after stage 19

Rank	Rider	Team	Time
~~1~~	~~Lance Armstrong (USA)~~	~~U.S. Postal Service~~	~~79h 27' 17"~~
2	Andreas Klöden (GER)	T-Mobile Team	+ 6' 38"
3	Ivan Basso (ITA)	Team CSC	+ 6' 59"
4	Jan Ullrich (GER)	T-Mobile Team	+ 9' 09"
5	José Azevedo (POR)	U.S. Postal Service	+ 14' 30"
6	Francisco Mancebo (ESP)	Illes Balears	+ 18' 20"
7	Georg Totschnig (AUT)	Gerolsteiner	+ 18' 46"
8	Carlos Sastre (ESP)	Team CSC	+ 20' 10"
9	Levi Leipheimer (USA)	Rabobank	+ 20' 31"
10	Óscar Pereiro (ESP)	Phonak Hearing Systems	+ 23' 13"

== Stage 20 ==
25 July 2004 — Montereau-Fault-Yonne to Paris, 163 km (101.3 mi)

The largely ceremonial run into Paris held some drama this year due to the closeness of the green jersey competition, which Robbie McEwen led going in by a slim 11 points. With two intermediate sprints and the finish line in Paris, there were plenty of opportunities for Thor Hushovd to take the lead. The two intermediate sprints had no effect on the overall standings, with Hushovd taking one and McEwen taking the other. The final sprint sealed it for McEwen, however, as he finished fourth and Hushovd failed to finish in the top 10.

Early dramatics, however, were provided when Fillipo Simeoni made another attack at 1 km. He was pulled in by 8 km by the US Postal led peloton, and Armstrong did not make any personal effort to chase him down this time. He made three subsequent attacks throughout the stage, all unsuccessful.

Shortly after Simeoni's first attack, Jimmy Casper, the lanterne rouge, or last place rider, made an attack, shooting out ahead of Armstrong. Having gotten his lead, he removed a digital camera from the pocket of his jersey and snapped a picture of him leading Armstrong, then dropped back to the peloton. 2004 is the second year that Casper has finished the Tour de France, and the second year he won the lanterne rouge.

As the peloton reached Paris, a ten-man break including Axel Merckx and Thomas Voeckler got away, but was pulled back several laps further down the Champs-Élysées. Eventually, the stage was won with a solid sprint by Tom Boonen. Armstrong sat well back, losing ten seconds to his nearest rival, but staying in the yellow jersey by well over six minutes. This appeared at the time to represent an unprecedented sixth Tour de France win for Armstrong, but he was stripped of the 2004 title with all others following a 2012 doping investigation.

Stage 20 result

Rank	Rider	Team	Time
1	Tom Boonen (BEL)	Quick-Step–Davitamon	4h 08' 26"
2	Jean-Patrick Nazon (FRA)	Ag2r Prévoyance	s.t.
3	Danilo Hondo (GER)	Gerolsteiner	s.t.
4	Robbie McEwen (AUS)	Lotto–Domo	s.t.
5	Erik Zabel (GER)	T-Mobile Team	s.t.
6	Jimmy Casper (FRA)	Cofidis – Le Crédit par Téléphone	s.t.
7	Stuart O'Grady (AUS)	Cofidis – Le Crédit par Téléphone	s.t.
8	Baden Cooke (AUS)	Française des Jeux	s.t.
9	Massimiliano Mori (ITA)	Domina Vacanze	s.t.
10	Bram De Groot (NED)	Rabobank	s.t.

General classification after stage 20

Rank	Rider	Team	Time
~~1~~	~~Lance Armstrong (USA)~~	~~U.S. Postal Service~~	~~83h 36' 02"~~
2	Andreas Klöden (GER)	T-Mobile Team	+ 6' 19"
3	Ivan Basso (ITA)	Team CSC	+ 6' 40"
4	Jan Ullrich (GER)	T-Mobile Team	+ 8' 50"
5	José Azevedo (POR)	U.S. Postal Service	+ 14' 30"
6	Francisco Mancebo (ESP)	Illes Balears	+ 18' 01"
7	Georg Totschnig (AUT)	Gerolsteiner	+ 18' 27"
8	Carlos Sastre (ESP)	Team CSC	+ 19' 51"
9	Levi Leipheimer (USA)	Rabobank	+ 20' 12"
10	Óscar Pereiro (ESP)	Phonak Hearing Systems	+ 22' 54"
