= Château de Mirabat =

Ruined castle in the Ariège département of France

Coordinates: 42.8448°N 1.2119°E

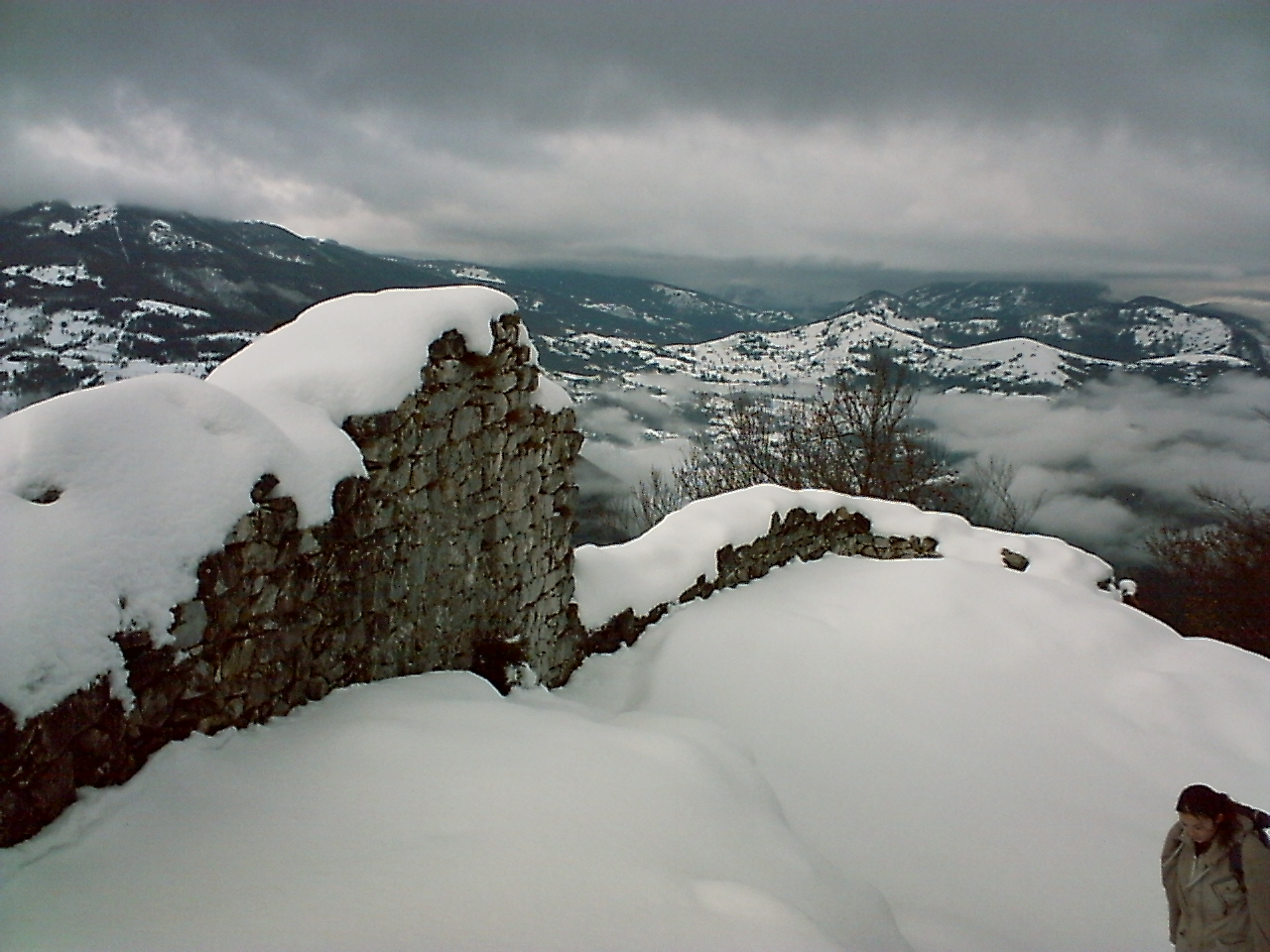
Chateau de Mirabat

The Château de Mirabat (Occitan: Castèl de Mirabat) is a ruined castle dating from before the Middle Ages in the communes of Seix, Oust and Ustou in the Ariège département of France.

== History ==
In excavation at Mirabat, a shard of Roman amphora was found at the bottom of a water tank.

It is the oldest of the Ariege's castles and one of the oldest castles in the Pyrenees. It was probably preceded by a "fire tower" built on the personal orders of Charlemagne. Mirabat was probably built to cope with a possible invasion of the Spanish Moors who passed through the pass of Salau, in sight of the castle. It became a garrison of the Viscount of Couserans in the 12th century to strengthen the frontier.

== Architecture ==
The castle was a garrison evidenced by its size and location. It could serve as a grouping of people and there was no stately home. The legendary Mirabat Cave is allows access to the Château de La Garde below. It contained a golden bell that sounded the alarm at the approach of danger. It is a simple cavity that leads to a vertical well after 8 m and after 30 m the course ends with a small passage too narrow for the passage of a man.

== Name and location ==
"Mirabat" is derived from the Occitan language mira abat, meaning to "look down". The choice of this strategic location was to monitor two routes leading from Spain, the Ustou and Martérat valleys, and the Salat valley from the pass of Salau. The castle overlooks the village of Seix.

== Castle defensive system ==
The castle is part of an exceptionally rare defensive system associated with the Château de La Garde. The castle was constructed at a very early date: it was in ruins in the 14th century. Its walls are built of white marble.

== Property ==
The property of the state and the commune, it has been listed since 1995 as a monument historique by the French Ministry of Culture.

== See also ==
- List of castles in France
