= Château de Latoue =

Castle in Occitania, France

Coordinates: 43°10′1″N 0°47′15″E

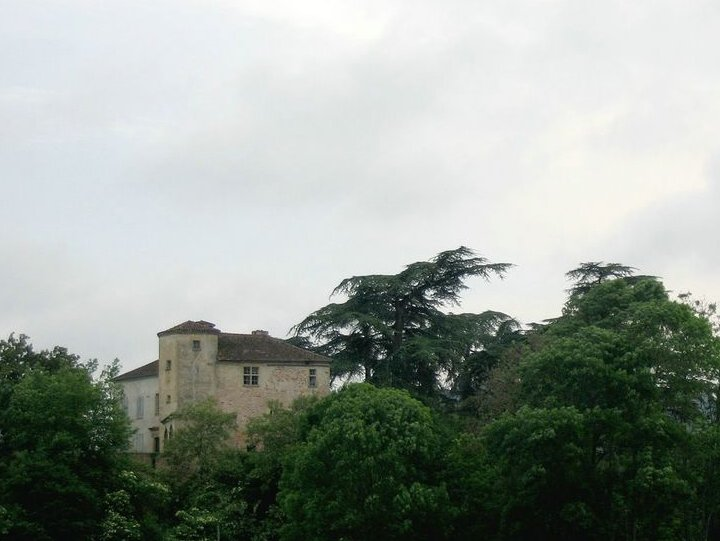
Castle de Latoue

The Château de Latoue is a castle in the commune of Latoue in the Haute-Garonne département of France. Construction began in the 11th century, with major additions and alterations in the 13th, 16th, and 18th centuries.

The castle is privately owned and it has been listed since 1979 as a monument historique by the French Ministry of Culture.

== See also ==
- List of castles in France
