= Seix =

Commune in Occitanie, France

- Commune
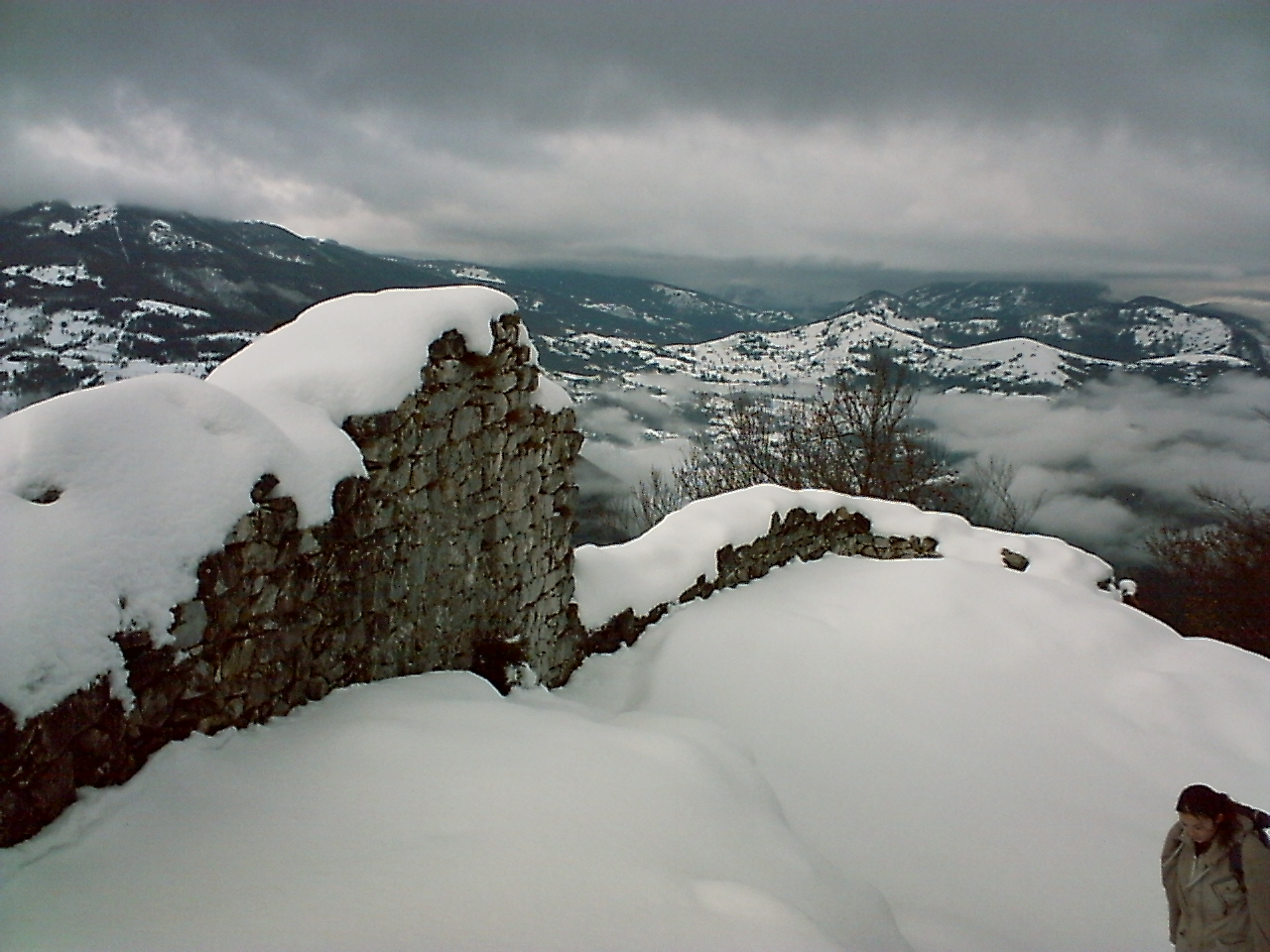
- Château de Mirabat

- Coat of arms
- Location of Seix
- Location within France Location within Occitanie
- Coordinates: 42°51′55″N 1°12′05″E
- Country: France
- Region: Occitania
- Department: Ariège
- Arrondissement: Saint-Girons
- Canton: Couserans Est

Government
  - Mayor (2020–2026): Hélène Nirascou
- Area^{1}: 86.78 km^{2} (33.51 sq mi)
- Elevation: 512 m (1,680 ft)
- Highest elevation: 2,838 m (9,311 ft)
- Lowest elevation: 495 m (1,624 ft)
- Population (2023): 762
  - Density: 8.78/km^{2} (22.7/sq mi)
- Time zone: UTC+01:00 (CET)
  - Summer (DST): UTC+02:00 (CEST)
- INSEE/Postal code: 09285 /09140
- ^{1} French Land Register data, which excludes lakes, ponds, glaciers > 1 km^{2} (0.386 sq mi or 247 acres) and river estuaries.

Seix (French pronunciation: [sɛks]; Occitan: Sèish) is a commune in the southwestern French department of Ariège.

== Population ==
Inhabitants of Seix are called Seixois in French.

Historical population
Year	Pop.	±% p.a.
1968	1,032	—
1975	1,009	−0.32%
1982	953	−0.81%
1990	806	−2.07%
1999	697	−1.60%
2007	806	+1.83%
2012	755	−1.30%
2017	702	−1.45%
2023	762	+1.38%
Source: INSEE

== Sights ==
- The Château de Mirabat, a Middle Ages castle, known to be in ruins in the 14th century, is in the communes of Seix, Oust and Ustou. Situated on the western end of the ridge of Mirabat, it looks directly over the town, and dominates the three valleys providing approaches to the north or south. It was once linked to a smaller fortification lower down on the southern slope which was possibly an intermediate 'barracks'. The castle was commissioned by Charlemagne (Charles Magna, or 'King Charles', of the 'Carol-ingian' dynasty that was to rule France for many years, having deposed the long haired 'Merovingian' dynasty of before) at the turn of the 10th century. Raiding south into more barbarous lands, he needed to protect his lines of communication and possible retreat, this pass through the mountains being a key link, and possible 'bottleneck'. It would almost certainly have served as a signal station also. A previous less informed expedition, returning through the western Pyrenees region, had become strung out on the march and was ransacked and destroyed by the tough mountain inhabitants. Built (and possibly garrisoned) by the townsfolk, they were thereafter made 'free men' by the King in gratitude for their service. It was almost certainly a wooden structure in the beginning, being upgraded to stone maybe a century later, as its importance increased entering the Feudal period. Much of the shape, and a metre or so of the wall, still survives nearly a millennium later.

== See also ==
- Communes of the Ariège department
