= Valcabrère =

- Commune
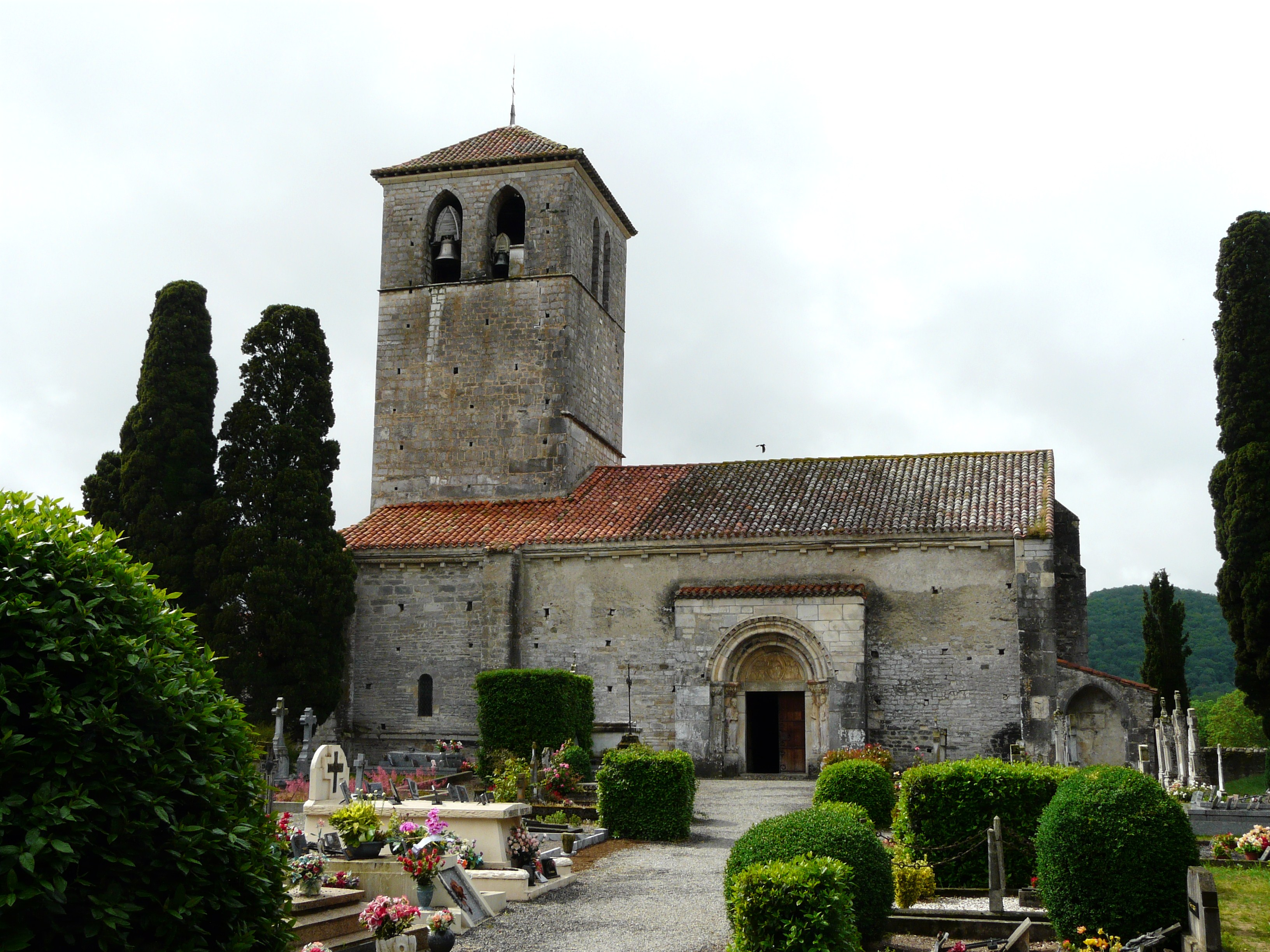
- The church in Valcabrère
- Location of Valcabrère
- Location within France Location within Occitanie
- Coordinates: 43°02′02″N 0°34′57″E
- Country: France
- Region: Occitania
- Department: Haute-Garonne
- Arrondissement: Saint-Gaudens
- Canton: Bagnères-de-Luchon

Government
  - Mayor (2020–2026): Jean Verdier
- Area^{1}: 1.61 km^{2} (0.62 sq mi)
- Elevation: 436 m (1,430 ft)
- Highest elevation: 471 m (1,545 ft)
- Lowest elevation: 424 m (1,391 ft)
- Population (2023): 151
  - Density: 93.8/km^{2} (243/sq mi)
- Time zone: UTC+01:00 (CET)
  - Summer (DST): UTC+02:00 (CEST)
- INSEE/Postal code: 31564 /31510
- ^{1} French Land Register data, which excludes lakes, ponds, glaciers > 1 km^{2} (0.386 sq mi or 247 acres) and river estuaries.

Valcabrère (French pronunciation: [valkabʁɛʁ]; Occitan: Vathcrabèra) is a commune in the Haute-Garonne department in southwestern France.

== Population ==
Historical population
Year	Pop.	±% p.a.
1968	105	—
1975	95	−1.42%
1982	120	+3.39%
1990	130	+1.01%
1999	139	+0.75%
2007	157	+1.53%
2012	146	−1.44%
2017	143	−0.41%
2023	151	+0.91%
Source: INSEE

== See also ==
- Communes of the Haute-Garonne department
