= Latoue =

- Commune
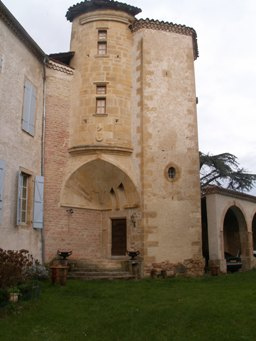
- Chateau
- Location of Latoue
- Location within France Location within Occitanie
- Coordinates: 43°10′12″N 0°47′11″E
- Country: France
- Region: Occitania
- Department: Haute-Garonne
- Arrondissement: Saint-Gaudens
- Canton: Cazères
- Intercommunality: CC Cœur et Coteaux du Comminges

Government
  - Mayor (2020–2026): Pierre Bosc
- Area^{1}: 17.62 km^{2} (6.80 sq mi)
- Elevation: 350 m (1,150 ft)
- Highest elevation: 488 m (1,601 ft)
- Lowest elevation: 333 m (1,093 ft)
- Population (2023): 310
  - Density: 18/km^{2} (46/sq mi)
- Time zone: UTC+01:00 (CET)
  - Summer (DST): UTC+02:00 (CEST)
- INSEE/Postal code: 31278 /31800
- ^{1} French Land Register data, which excludes lakes, ponds, glaciers > 1 km^{2} (0.386 sq mi or 247 acres) and river estuaries.

Latoue (Occitan: Tatouatge) is a village and commune in the Haute-Garonne department of southwestern France. It is best known for the castle that dominates the village.

== Population ==
Historical population
Year	Pop.	±% p.a.
1968	379	—
1975	327	−2.09%
1982	323	−0.18%
1990	294	−1.17%
1999	284	−0.38%
2007	299	+0.65%
2012	329	+1.93%
2017	323	−0.37%
2023	310	−0.68%
Source: INSEE

== Sights ==
The Château de Latoue is a castle first built in the 12th century, with major additions and alterations in the 13th, 16th, and 18th centuries. Privately owned, it has been listed as a historic site by the French Ministry of Culture since 1979.

== See also ==
- Communes of the Haute-Garonne department
