= Lac d'Izourt =

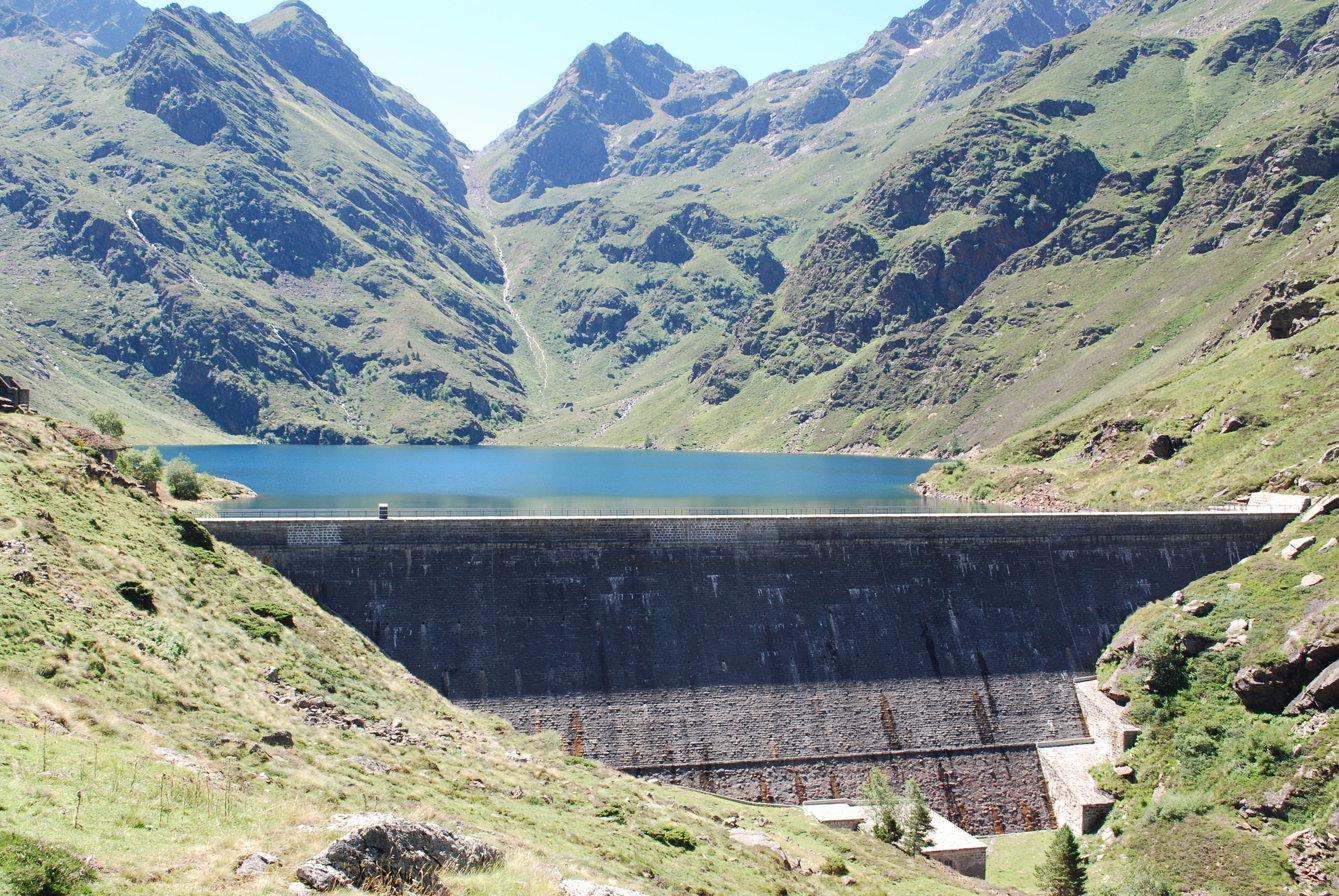

- Location within France
- Location: Ariège
- Coordinates: 42°41′17″N 01°29′52″E
- Type: reservoir
- Catchment area: 14.9 km^{2} (5.8 mi^{2})
- Basin countries: France
- Max. length: 990 m (3,250 ft)
- Max. width: 485 m (1,591 ft)
- Surface area: 0.33 km^{2} (0.13 sq mi)
- Water volume: 7,900,000 m^{3} (280,000,000 ft^{3})
- Surface elevation: 1,645 m (5,397 ft)

Lac d'Izourt is an artificial reservoir in the French Pyrenees, located in the upper Vicdessos valley in the Ariège department, France. At an elevation of 1,645 m, it has a surface area of 0.33 km^{2}.

The dam was built on the Artiès stream and as of 2026, is operated by Électricité de France.

The construction of this reservoir was intended to supply hydroelectric power to a station at Pradières, located downstream at an elevation of 1,176 meters.

The natural lake is a dimictic lake, with two periods of mixing a year, and was formed by glacial retreat. The natural lake existed before the construction of the dam.

== Construction of the dam ==
The dam was built between 1937 and 1940, with 349 workers participating in the construction project, including 108 French, 107 Italian, 39 Spanish, 18 Andorrans, 2 Poles and 1 Swiss.

Barracks were built from stone to house these foreign workers, the remains of which are still visible today.

On 24 March 1939, a particularly severe storm struck the region, with the piled up snow causing two buildings to collapse. This killed 31 workers, 29 of which were Italian.

The reservoir was filled with water in May 1940.
