= Oust, Ariège =

Commune in Occitanie, France

Oust
- Commune
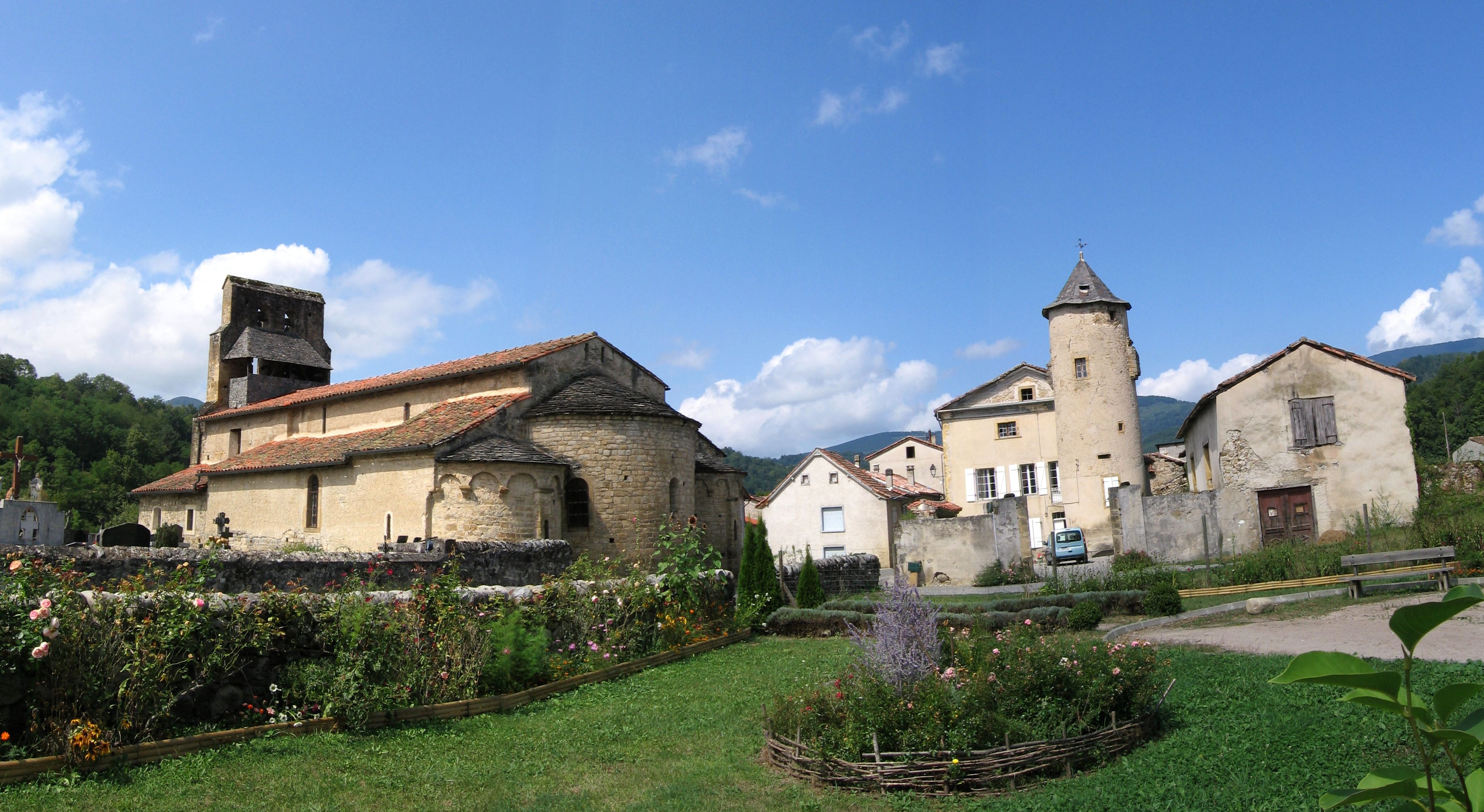
- Vic d'Oust
- Location of Oust
- Location within France Location within Occitanie
- Coordinates: 42°52′33″N 1°12′57″E
- Country: France
- Region: Occitania
- Department: Ariège
- Arrondissement: Saint-Girons
- Canton: Couserans Est
- Intercommunality: Couserans-Pyrénées

Government
  - Mayor (2021–2026): Richard de Meritens de Villeneuve
- Area^{1}: 18.97 km^{2} (7.32 sq mi)
- Elevation: 501 m (1,644 ft)
- Highest elevation: 1,494 m (4,902 ft)
- Lowest elevation: 480 m (1,570 ft)
- Population (2023): 583
  - Density: 30.7/km^{2} (79.6/sq mi)
- Time zone: UTC+01:00 (CET)
  - Summer (DST): UTC+02:00 (CEST)
- INSEE/Postal code: 09223 /09140
- ^{1} French Land Register data, which excludes lakes, ponds, glaciers > 1 km^{2} (0.386 sq mi or 247 acres) and river estuaries.

Oust (French pronunciation: [ust]; Occitan: Ost) is a commune in the Ariège department in southwestern France.

== Population ==
Inhabitants of Oust are called Oustois in French.

Historical population
Year	Pop.	±% p.a.
1968	441	—
1975	581	+4.02%
1982	503	−2.04%
1990	449	−1.41%
1999	515	+1.54%
2007	531	+0.38%
2012	547	+0.60%
2017	545	−0.07%
2023	583	+1.13%
Source: INSEE

== Sights ==
- The Château de Mirabat, a medieval castle, known to be in ruins in the 14th century, is in the communes of Seix, Oust and Ustou.

== See also ==
- Communes of the Ariège department
