= Ustou =

Commune in Occitanie, France

- Commune
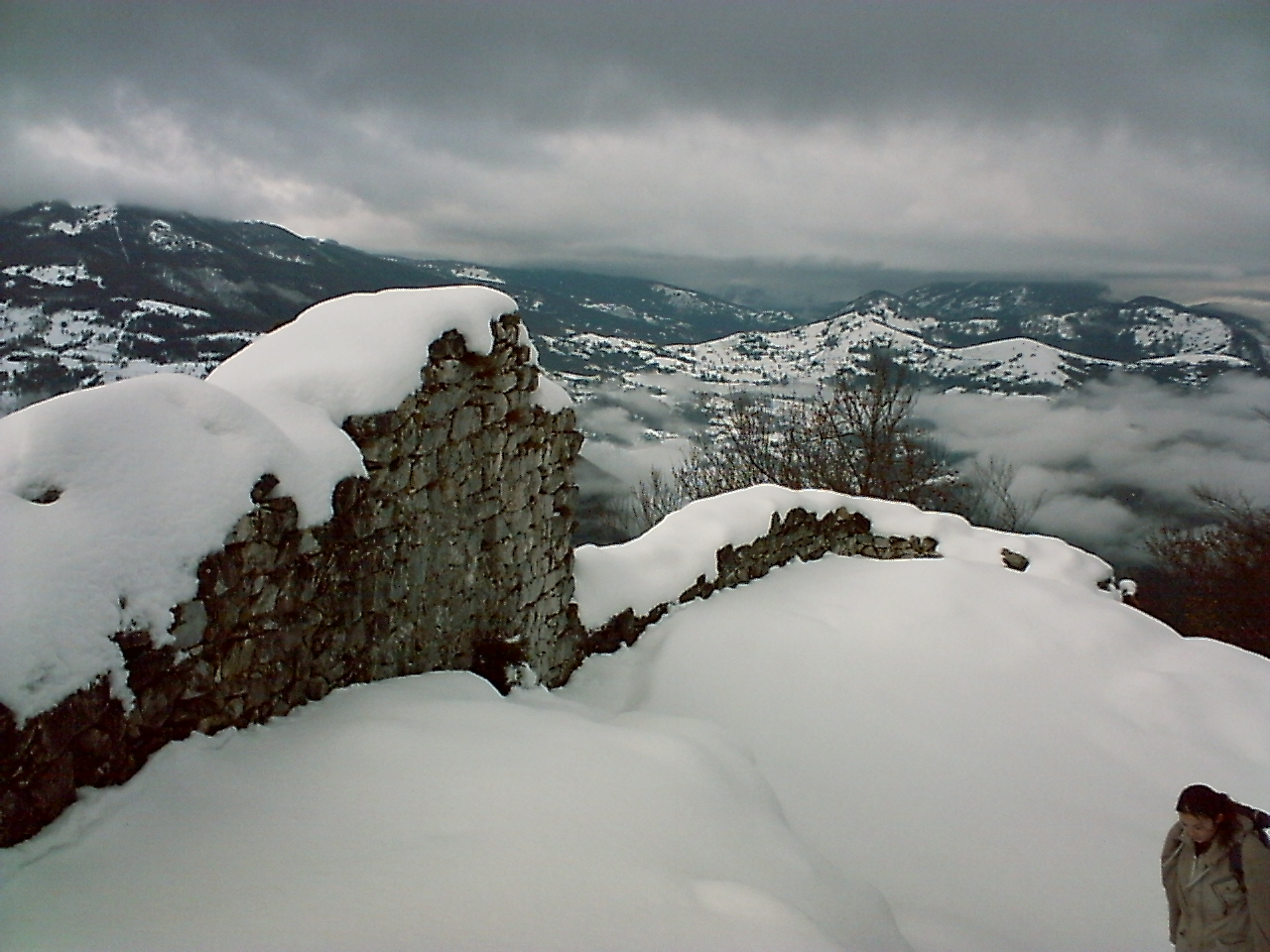
- Ruins of the chateau of Mirabat
- Location of Ustou
- Location within France Location within Occitanie
- Coordinates: 42°47′59″N 1°15′52″E
- Country: France
- Region: Occitania
- Department: Ariège
- Arrondissement: Saint-Girons
- Canton: Couserans Est

Government
  - Mayor (2020–2026): Alain Servat
- Area^{1}: 98.34 km^{2} (37.97 sq mi)
- Elevation: 746 m (2,448 ft)
- Highest elevation: 2,803 m (9,196 ft)
- Lowest elevation: 560 m (1,840 ft)
- Population (2023): 281
  - Density: 2.86/km^{2} (7.40/sq mi)
- Time zone: UTC+01:00 (CET)
  - Summer (DST): UTC+02:00 (CEST)
- INSEE/Postal code: 09322 /09140
- ^{1} French Land Register data, which excludes lakes, ponds, glaciers > 1 km^{2} (0.386 sq mi or 247 acres) and river estuaries.

Ustou (French pronunciation: [ystu]; Occitan: Uston) is a commune in the Ariège department in southwestern France.

The commune of Ustou comprises several villages: Saint-Lizier, Le Trein, Sérac; and numerous hamlets, including: Escots, Bieille, Rouze.

== Population ==
Inhabitants of Ustou are called Ustouens in French.

Historical population
Year	Pop.	±% p.a.
1968	502	—
1975	428	−2.25%
1982	520	+2.82%
1990	351	−4.79%
1999	299	−1.77%
2007	351	+2.02%
2012	324	−1.59%
2017	301	−1.46%
2023	281	−1.14%
Source: INSEE

== Sights ==
- The Château de Mirabat, a Middle Ages castle, known to be in ruins in the 14th century, is in the communes of Seix, Oust and Ustou.

== See also ==
- Communes of the Ariège department
