= Col du Grand Cucheron =

Mountain pass in the French Alps

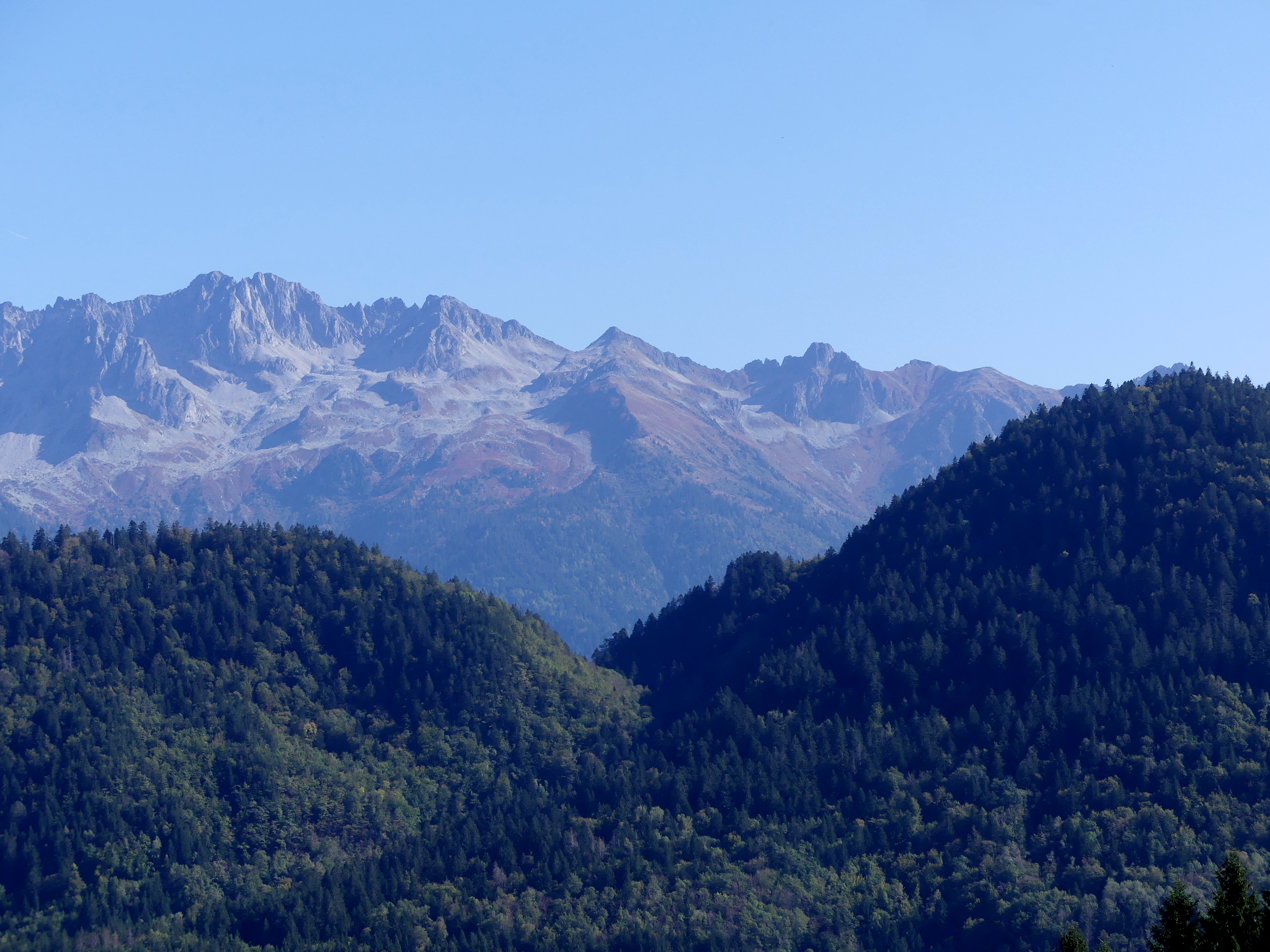
- View of the pass and Lauzière mountain range

- Location within Alps
- Elevation: 1,188 m (3,898 ft)
- Traversed by: D207

Third Approach
- Location: Savoie, France
- Range: Alps
- Coordinates: 45°29′24″N 6°14′53″E

Col du Grand Cucheron, at an elevation of 1,188 metres (3,898 ft), is a mountain pass in the Alps in the department of Savoie in France. The pass crosses the northern end of the Belledonne massif, connecting the Maurienne and Isère valleys. The climb to the col was used on Stage 12 of the 2012 Tour de France.

== Cycle racing ==
=== Details of the climbs ===
From Les Granges (near Le Pontet) (west) the ascent is 4.01 kilometres (2.49 mi) long. Over this distance, the elevation changes by 314 metres (1,030 ft) at an average gradient of 7.7 percent.

From La Corbière (near Saint-Pierre-de-Belleville) (east), the climb is 11.6 kilometres (7.2 mi) long, gaining 805 metres (2,641 ft) at an average of 6.9 percent. This was the direction from which the col was climbed in the 2012 Tour de France.

The climb can also be accessed from Aiguebelle (northeast) from where the route is 16 kilometres (9.9 mi) at an average of 6.1 percent, gaining 870 metres (2,850 ft). This route connects with that from La Corbière just after passing through Saint-Georges-des-Hurtières.

=== Appearances in Tour de France ===
The pass was first included in the Tour de France in 1972 and has since featured three times, most recently in 2012. It is generally ranked as a Category 2 climb. It was crossed on Stage 12 of the 2012 tour, between Saint-Jean-de-Maurienne and Annonay-Davézieux, approaching from the direction of Saint-Pierre-de-Belleville.

Year	Stage	Category	Start	Finish	Leader at the summit
2012	12	1	Saint-Jean-de-Maurienne	Annonay-Davézieux	Robert Kišerlovski (CRO)
1998	16	2	Vizille	Albertville	Stéphane Heulot (FRA)
1983	17	2	La Tour-du-Pin	L'Alpe d'Huez	Serge Demierre (SUI)
1972	14b	2	Valloire	Aix-les-Bains	Eddy Merckx (BEL)
