= 2012 Tour de France, Stage 11 to Stage 20 =

Stage 11 to Stage 20 of the 2012 Tour de France

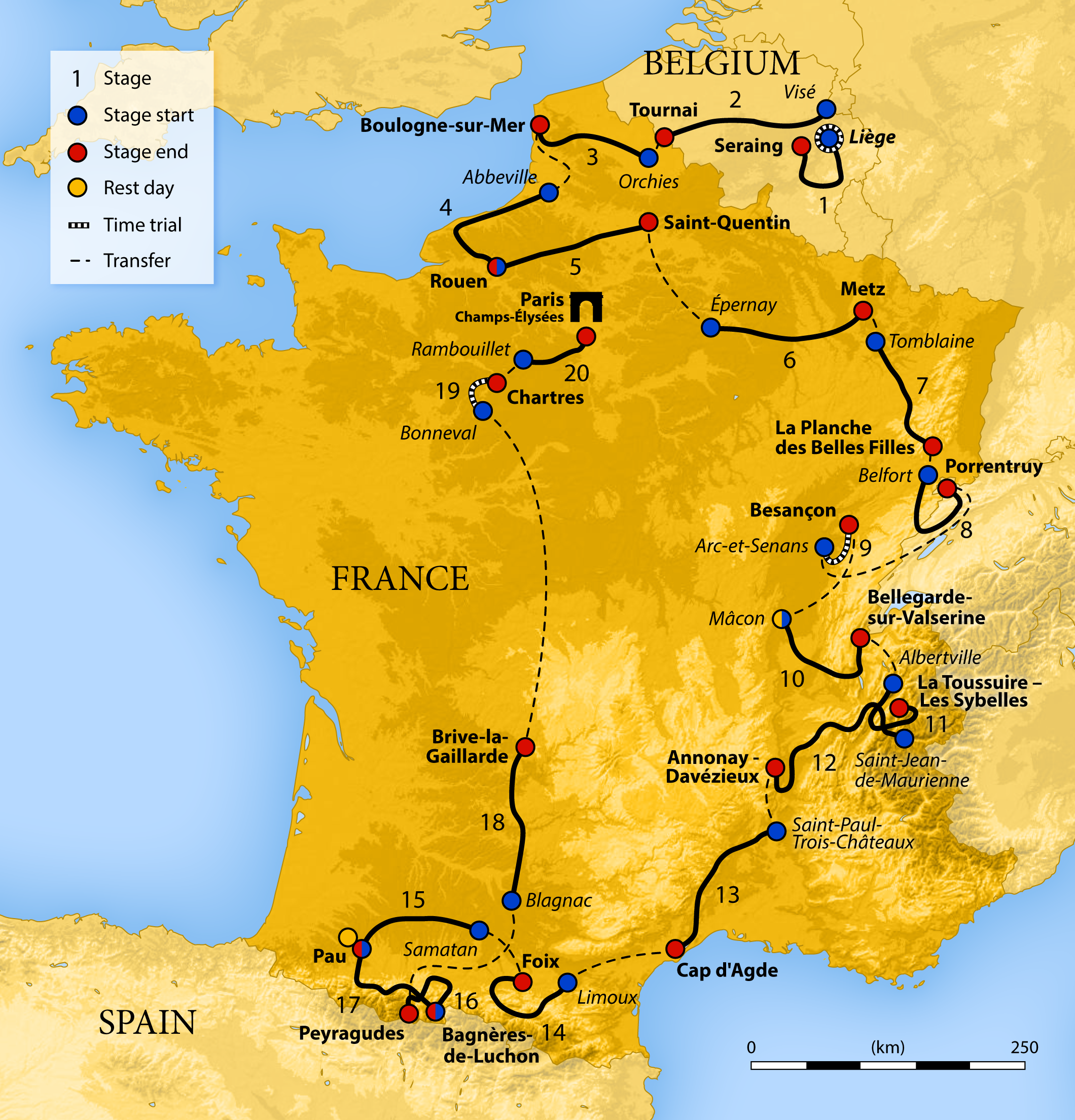
Overview of the stages; black lines represent distances covered in the individual stages, while dashed lines are the distances covered in transfers between the stages.

Stage 11 of the 2012 Tour de France was contested on 12 July and the race concluded with Stage 20 on 22 July. The second half of the race was situated entirely within France; starting with a mountain stage from Albertville to La Toussuire-Les Sybelles – incorporating two hors catégorie climbs during the stage – before the customary race-concluding stage finish on the Champs-Élysées in Paris.

Following his victory in the ninth stage individual time trial, Team Sky rider Bradley Wiggins held the lead into the second half of the race. He maintained his race lead throughout the second half of the race, holding a lead of 2 minutes and 5 seconds – transpiring from stage 9 – until the race's final individual time trial, held on the penultimate day of the race. Wiggins won the stage by 1 minute and 16 seconds ahead of his team-mate Chris Froome, and Wiggins ultimately held his lead into Paris the following day to win the race overall by 3 minutes and 21 seconds, to become the first rider from Great Britain to win a Grand Tour race. Froome finished second, while the final podium was completed by former Vuelta a España winner Vincenzo Nibali, riding for the Liquigas–Cannondale team, who was the only other rider to finish within 10 minutes of Wiggins' final overall time.

Only Wiggins' team-mate Mark Cavendish was able to win more than one stage during the second half of the race, winning two of the final three stages including a fourth consecutive final stage victory in Paris. This victory allowed him to become the most prolific sprinter at the Tour de France with 23 stage victories, surpassing the record of 22 which had been held for 48 years by France's André Darrigade. Three French riders – Pierre Rolland, Pierrick Fédrigo and Thomas Voeckler – each took a stage victory during the second half of the race, with Voeckler's victory in the queen stage helping in part for him to become the eventual winner of the mountains classification. Other stage victories were taken by David Millar, André Greipel, Luis León Sánchez and Alejandro Valverde.

During the fourteenth stage of the race, Wiggins neutralised the peloton on the descent from the Mur de Péguère climb, after carpet tacks were found to be responsible for around thirty punctures on the climb itself. Among those delayed was the defending champion Cadel Evans, who suffered three punctures on the climb and had lost around two minutes before Wiggins called a truce in the main field, allowing the breakaway to finish the stage over eighteen minutes clear of the pack. Following the raid of the Cofidis team hotel during the first rest day, the second rest day was marked by a positive drugs test by RadioShack–Nissan rider Fränk Schleck, the third-placed rider from the 2011 race. Schleck quit the race after traces of xipamide, a banned sulfonamide diuretic drug, were found in the A-sample of his urine, and was later confirmed by the B-sample.

== Classification standings ==
Legend (Note: Jerseys appearing in the table on the left of the page indicate those worn by the cyclist during the particular stage, while those appearing in the table on the right of the page indicate those awarded to the cyclist after the stage.)
Yellow jersey	Denotes the leader of the general classification	Green jersey	Denotes the leader of the points classification
Polka dot jersey	Denotes the leader of the mountains classification	White jersey	Denotes the leader of the young rider classification
Jersey with a yellow background on the number bib.	Denotes the leader of the team classification (Note: The bibs are designated to all remaining riders within the leading team.)	Jersey with a red background on the number bib.	Denotes the winner of the combativity award

== Stage 11 ==
12 July 2012 — Albertville to La Toussuire-Les Sybelles, 148 km (92.0 mi)

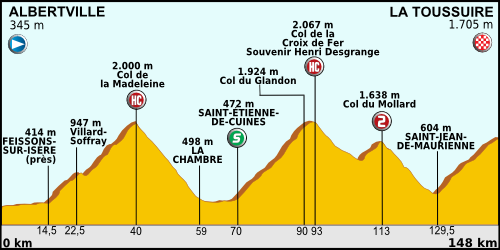
Stage eleven profile

The stage was spent entirely in the Alps with two hors catégorie climbs – the Col de la Madeleine after 40 km (24.9 mi) and the Col de la Croix de Fer after 93 km (57.8 mi); both of which had summits at 2,000 m (6,562 ft) or higher – before the finish at La Toussuire-Les Sybelles. The Col de la Croix de Fer was the highest point reached in the Alps in the 2012 Tour, so the leader across the summit would win the Souvenir Henri Desgrange. The finish was a first-category climb of 18 km (11.2 mi) at an average gradient of 6.1%. Much like the previous day, a large breakaway was formed after several different groups advanced clear of the main field as they approached the first climb of the day, at the Col de la Madeleine.

In total, there were 28 riders in the group at one point; at the top of the climb, the pace picked up and the group splintered into several mini-groups as Omega Pharma–Quick-Step's Peter Velits scored the maximum points on offer for the climb, followed closely by Astana rider Fredrik Kessiakoff. Velits and Kessiakoff pulled out a 45-second advantage on the descent, but eight riders eventually bridged the gap and rejoined the duo before the Col de la Croix de Fer. Team Europcar had two riders in the group, with Christophe Kern setting the pace for team-mate Pierre Rolland, and the tempo was again splitting the group up. Back in the peloton, young rider classification leader Tejay van Garderen (BMC Racing Team) attacked on the climb, as the benchmark for a later move by his team-mate Cadel Evans. They acquired a 30-second lead at one point before Team Sky brought Bradley Wiggins back up to them. Kessiakoff just bettered Rolland for the mountains points atop the Col de la Croix de Fer, with the peloton around two minutes behind.

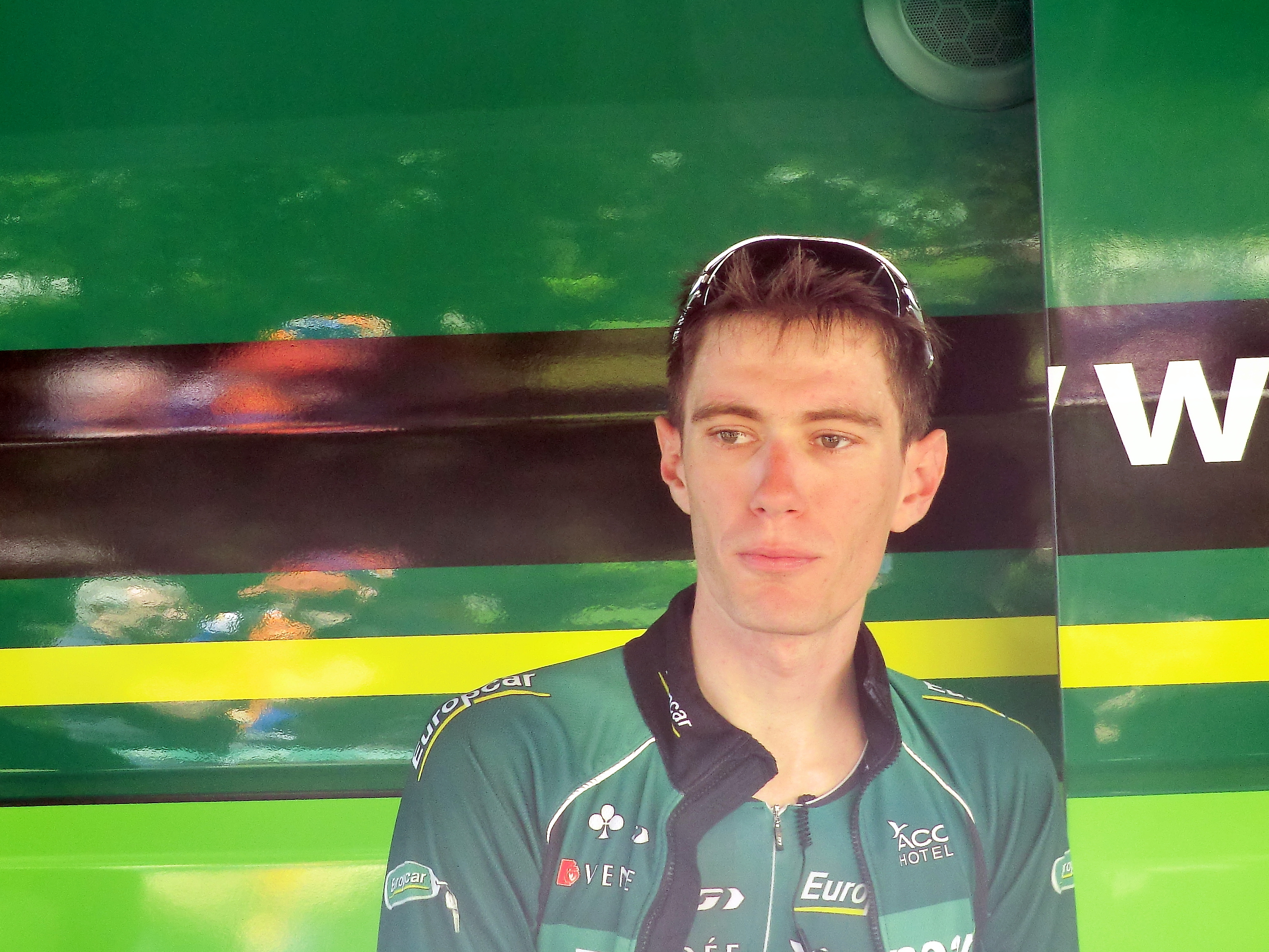
Team Europcar's Pierre Rolland (pictured in 2013), the winner of the eleventh stage

The group containing Wiggins and other overall contenders dropped a minute further back on the early parts of the Col du Mollard, where the breakaway consisted of Velits, Rolland, Saxo Bank–Tinkoff Bank's Chris Anker Sørensen and Robert Kišerlovski of Astana, with Movistar Team's Vasil Kiryienka later joining up. Rolland crashed on the descent from the climb, having taken first place points over the summit, while Sørensen was in difficulty to stay with the lead. Liquigas–Cannondale rider Vincenzo Nibali tried to breach the peloton on two occasions on the final climb, catching up with Lotto–Belisol's Jurgen Van den Broeck who had escaped with eighth stage winner, FDJ–BigMat's Thibaut Pinot. Evans cracked on the climb, losing time to Wiggins, team-mate Chris Froome and other contenders. Froome put Wiggins into difficulty at one point, but backed the pace down via his team radio. Up front, Rolland was the last remaining rider of the breakaway, and soloed to his second Tour stage win, and his team's second stage win in a row. Pinot led the yellow jersey group across the line almost a minute down, while Evans lost almost 90 seconds on Wiggins, Froome and Nibali, who filled the top three places overall at the conclusion of the stage.

Stage 11 result
Rank	Rider	Team	Time
1	Pierre Rolland (FRA)	Team Europcar	4h 43' 54"
2	Thibaut Pinot (FRA)	FDJ–BigMat	+ 55"
3	Chris Froome (GBR)	Team Sky	+ 55"
4	Jurgen Van den Broeck (BEL)	Lotto–Belisol	+ 57"
5	Vincenzo Nibali (ITA)	Liquigas–Cannondale	+ 57"
6	Bradley Wiggins (GBR)	Team Sky	+ 57"
7	Chris Anker Sørensen (DEN)	Saxo Bank–Tinkoff Bank	+ 1' 08"
8	Janez Brajkovič (SLO)	Astana	+ 1' 58"
9	Vasil Kiryienka (BLR)	Movistar Team	+ 2' 13"
10	Fränk Schleck (LUX)	RadioShack–Nissan	+ 2' 23"

General classification after stage 11
Rank	Rider	Team	Time
1	Bradley Wiggins (GBR)	Team Sky	48h 43' 53"
2	Chris Froome (GBR)	Team Sky	+ 2' 05"
3	Vincenzo Nibali (ITA)	Liquigas–Cannondale	+ 2' 23"
4	Cadel Evans (AUS)	BMC Racing Team	+ 3' 19"
5	Jurgen Van den Broeck (BEL)	Lotto–Belisol	+ 4' 48"
6	Haimar Zubeldia (ESP)	RadioShack–Nissan	+ 6' 15"
7	Tejay van Garderen (USA)	BMC Racing Team	+ 6' 57"
8	Janez Brajkovič (SLO)	Astana	+ 7' 30"
9	Pierre Rolland (FRA)	Team Europcar	+ 8' 31"
10	Thibaut Pinot (FRA)	FDJ–BigMat	+ 8' 51"

== Stage 12 ==
13 July 2012 — Saint-Jean-de-Maurienne to Annonay–Davézieux, 226 km (140.4 mi)

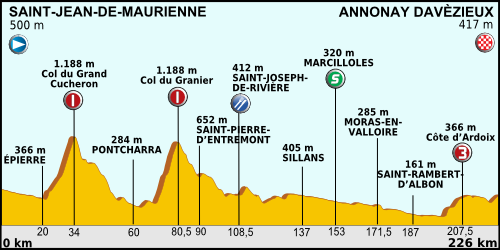
Stage twelve profile

With a parcours of 226 km (140.4 mi), the twelfth stage was the longest of the Tour; the race left the Alps but only after a pair of first-category climbs – the 1,188 m (3,898 ft) Col du Grand Cucheron and the 1,134 m (3,720 ft) Col du Granier – in the first 80 km (49.7 mi), although there was also a third-category climb of the Côte d'Ardoix within the final 20 km (12.4 mi), before the finish in Annonay-Davézieux. As had been the case in the previous two stages, there was another large breakaway group that set the tempo outside of the peloton in the early running. At its maximum, the group contained nineteen riders, but it had been reduced to eleven by the time the group reached the foot of the opening climb, the Col du Grand Cucheron.

Robert Kišerlovski of Astana took the maximum points on offer for the climb, to help protect the lead of the classification, held by team-mate Fredrik Kessiakoff. Cofidis rider David Moncoutié tried to bridge the gap to reach the lead group, but crashed heavily on the descent from the climb. He had to abandon the race with abrasions. Kišerlovski also took maximum points on the Col du Granier, which made Kessiakoff's lead safe for another day. After reaching the mid-stage feeding zone in Saint-Joseph-de-Rivière, the lead group split and five riders – David Millar of Garmin–Sharp, Ag2r–La Mondiale rider Jean-Christophe Péraud, Euskaltel–Euskadi's Egoi Martínez, Kišerlovski and Cyril Gautier, looking to give Team Europcar a third win in a row – accelerated away to a near 13-minute lead at its maximum. With none of the riders being in overall contention, the peloton let the group go and decided not to chase them down before the finish.

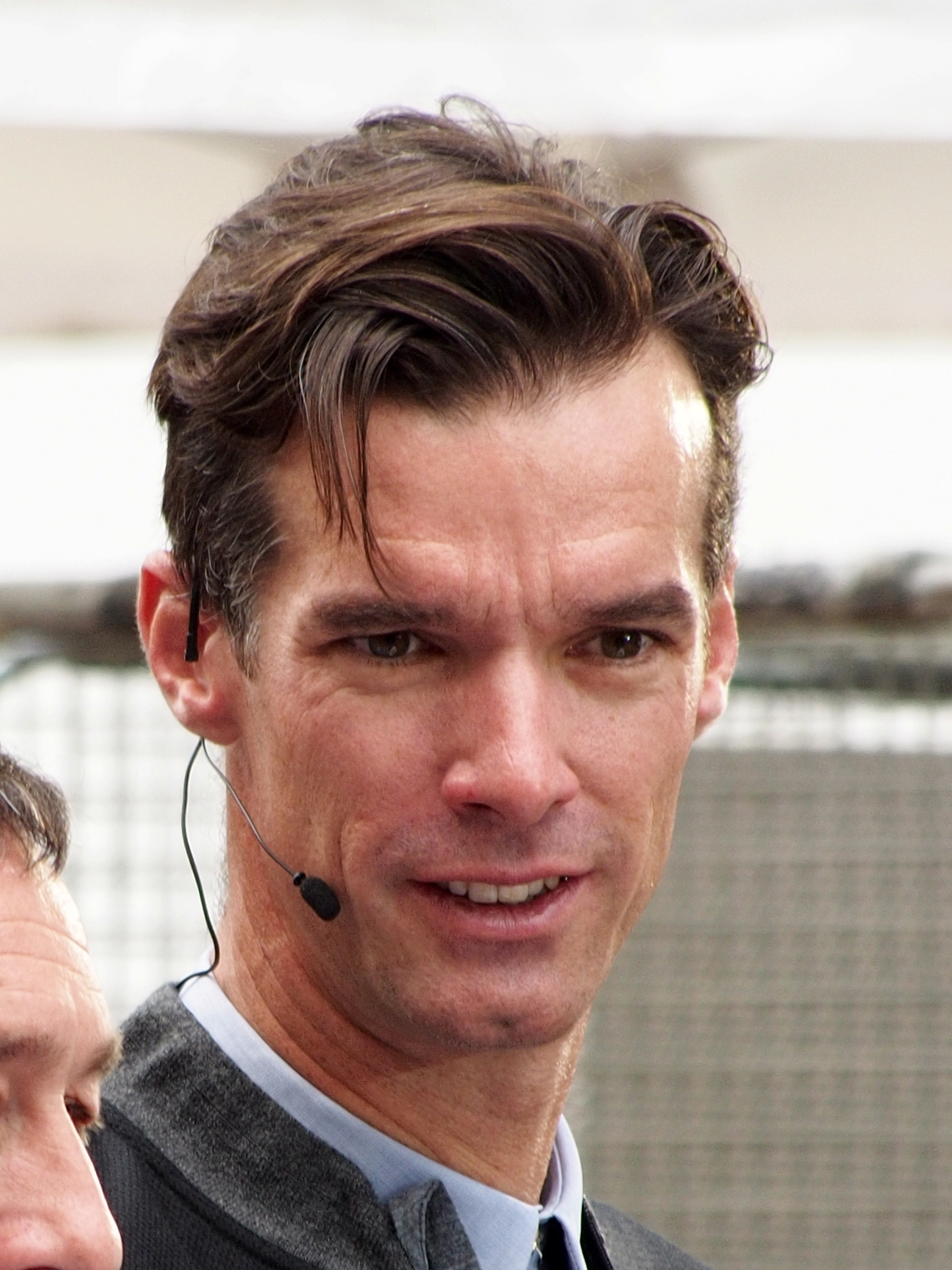
Stage twelve winner, David Millar of Garmin–Sharp (pictured in 2014)

None of the quintet attacked each other, and they remained as one into the final 5 km (3.1 mi) of the stage. Kišerlovski played his hand first, launching an attack with 3.5 km (2.2 mi) remaining, but Péraud closed down the move almost immediately; a secondary move took Martínez and Gautier out of the equation for the stage victory. Péraud accelerated again and Millar latched onto his wheel with Kišerlovski unable to follow the pair. Millar took the front inside the final 1 km (0.6 mi), but Péraud remained on his wheel until just before 200 m (660 ft) to go; he launched his attack, but Millar beat him to the line for his fourth individual stage victory at the Tour – his first since 2003 – and the fourth different British rider to take a stage win at the 2012 Tour. The peloton was led across the line almost eight minutes down by the top two in the points classification, Orica–GreenEDGE's Matthew Goss and Liquigas–Cannondale's Peter Sagan. Sagan protested the sprint finish of Goss, feeling that he had impeded him in the closing metres. Race officials agreed with Sagan and demoted Goss to seventh – helped in part by a one-second time gap between them and the rest of the field – and penalised him 30 points in the classification, and 30 seconds overall.

Stage 12 result
Rank	Rider	Team	Time
1	David Millar (GBR)	Garmin–Sharp	5h 42' 46"
2	Jean-Christophe Péraud (FRA)	Ag2r–La Mondiale	+ 0"
3	Egoi Martínez (ESP)	Euskaltel–Euskadi	+ 5"
4	Cyril Gautier (FRA)	Team Europcar	+ 5"
5	Robert Kišerlovski (CRO)	Astana	+ 5"
6	Peter Sagan (SVK)	Liquigas–Cannondale	+ 7' 53"
7	Matthew Goss (AUS)	Orica–GreenEDGE	+ 7' 53"
8	Sébastien Hinault (FRA)	Ag2r–La Mondiale	+ 7' 54"
9	Cadel Evans (AUS)	BMC Racing Team	+ 7' 54"
10	Luca Paolini (ITA)	Team Katusha	+ 7' 54"

General classification after stage 12
Rank	Rider	Team	Time
1	Bradley Wiggins (GBR)	Team Sky	54h 34' 33"
2	Chris Froome (GBR)	Team Sky	+ 2' 05"
3	Vincenzo Nibali (ITA)	Liquigas–Cannondale	+ 2' 23"
4	Cadel Evans (AUS)	BMC Racing Team	+ 3' 19"
5	Jurgen Van den Broeck (BEL)	Lotto–Belisol	+ 4' 48"
6	Haimar Zubeldia (ESP)	RadioShack–Nissan	+ 6' 15"
7	Tejay van Garderen (USA)	BMC Racing Team	+ 6' 57"
8	Janez Brajkovič (SLO)	Astana	+ 7' 30"
9	Pierre Rolland (FRA)	Team Europcar	+ 8' 31"
10	Thibaut Pinot (FRA)	FDJ–BigMat	+ 8' 51"

== Stage 13 ==
14 July 2012 — Saint-Paul-Trois-Châteaux to Cap d'Agde, 217 km (134.8 mi)

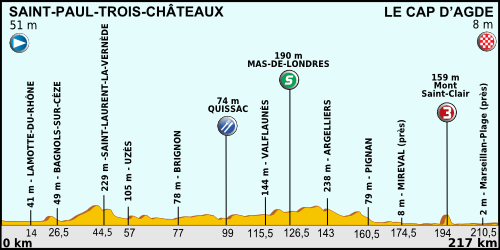
Stage thirteen profile

This transitional stage took the Tour to the Mediterranean. The day's only categorised climb over Mont-Saint-Clair at Sète and the wind off the sea were two potential disruptions to the race in the final 28 km (17.4 mi) of the stage. For the celebration of Bastille Day, the breakaway had extensive French representation, with five of the eight-rider move – Cofidis rider Samuel Dumoulin, FDJ–BigMat's Mathieu Ladagnous, Jimmy Engoulvent of Saur–Sojasun, Maxime Bouet (Ag2r–La Mondiale) and Jérôme Pineau, representing the Omega Pharma–Quick-Step team – from the country. The group was rounded out by Pablo Urtasun of Euskaltel–Euskadi, Saxo Bank–Tinkoff Bank's Michael Mørkøv and Argos–Shimano rider Roy Curvers.

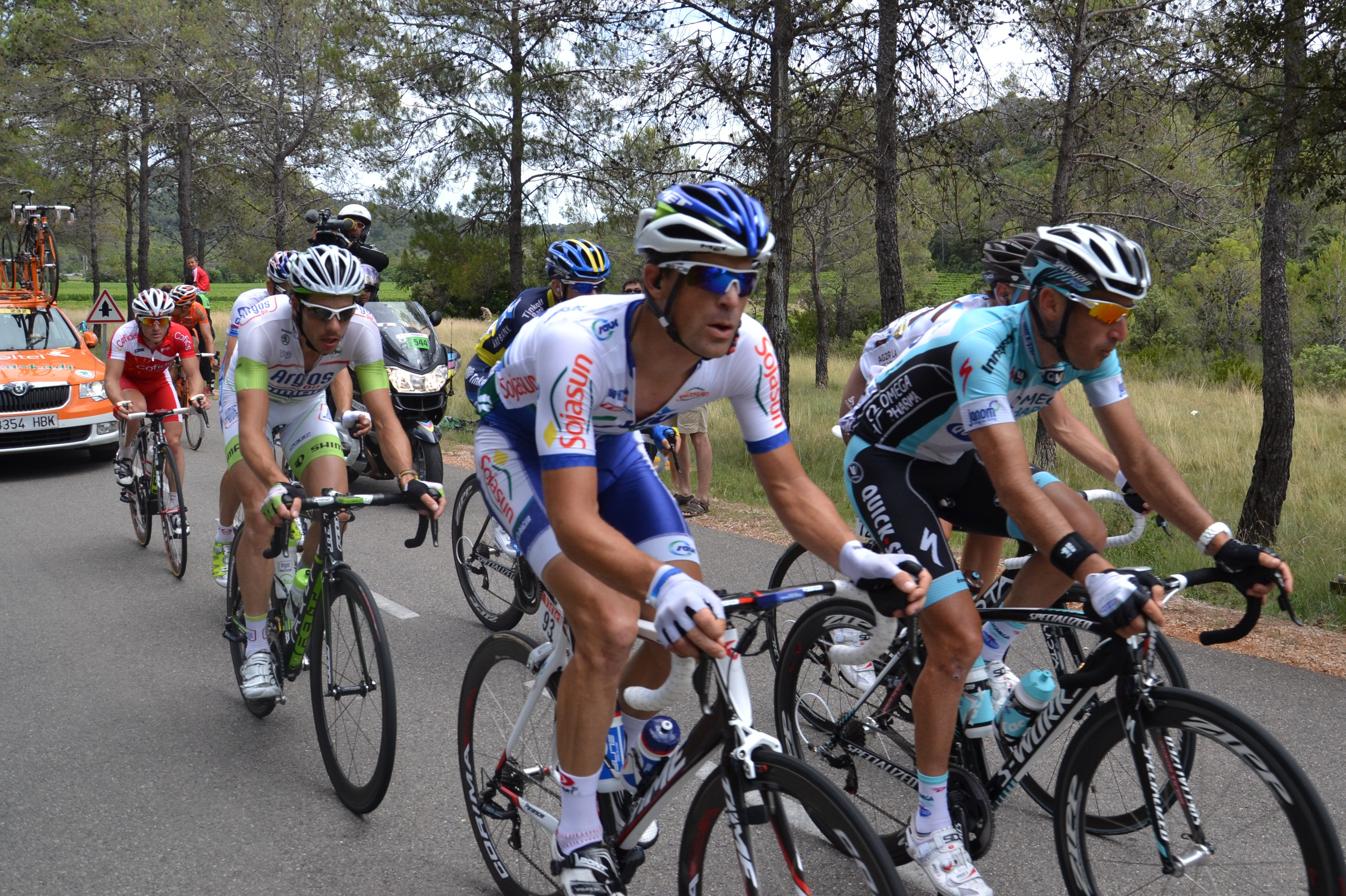
The day's breakaway at Pic Saint-Loup just over halfway into the stage. Jérôme Pineau leads Jimmy Engoulvent, Maxime Bouet, Roy Curvers, Michael Mørkøv, Mathieu Ladagnous, Samuel Dumoulin and Pablo Urtasun.

The octet made their escape in the opening 20 km (12.4 mi) of the stage, and their advantage eventually stemmed to a maximum of almost 10 minutes at the 35 km (21.7 mi) mark, before Orica–GreenEDGE sent riders forward to the front of the peloton in order to bring the gap down. Urtasun led the group across the line at the stage's intermediate sprint point in Mas-de-Londres, but behind, points classification leader Peter Sagan (Liquigas–Cannondale) was able to launch his sprint for the line before Orica–GreenEDGE's sprinter Matthew Goss did so, and extended his lead in the standings as a result. Pineau looked to go clear with 65 km (40.4 mi) to go, but his move was anticipated by Mørkøv, before he attacked of his own accord. Mørkøv held a one-minute advantage over his former breakaway companions all the way to the foot of the Mont-Saint-Clair, but the peloton were able to close the advantage to them all before the summit of the climb.

BMC Racing Team's Cadel Evans and Lotto–Belisol rider Jurgen Van den Broeck both attacked on the Mont-Saint-Clair, and their accelerated pace ripped the peloton apart, with many riders falling off the back of the peloton. Around 25 riders remained in the lead group, with only Sagan and Van Den Broeck's team-mate André Greipel out of the sprinters making the group. Further moves came from Astana rider Alexander Vinokourov, Michael Albasini of Orica–GreenEDGE, and Rabobank's Luis León Sánchez, but they were closed down by Lotto–Belisol – looking after Greipel for the finish – and Team Sky for race leader Bradley Wiggins. Wiggins led out team-mate Edvald Boasson Hagen for the sprint, but Greipel launched his own off his wheel and managed to fend off a quick-finishing Sagan to take his third stage win of the Tour by half a wheel, the first such feat by a German rider since Erik Zabel in 2001.

Stage 13 result
Rank	Rider	Team	Time
1	André Greipel (GER)	Lotto–Belisol	4h 57' 59"
2	Peter Sagan (SVK)	Liquigas–Cannondale	+ 0"
3	Edvald Boasson Hagen (NOR)	Team Sky	+ 0"
4	Sébastien Hinault (FRA)	Ag2r–La Mondiale	+ 0"
5	Daryl Impey (RSA)	Orica–GreenEDGE	+ 0"
6	Julien Simon (FRA)	Saur–Sojasun	+ 0"
7	Marco Marcato (ITA)	Vacansoleil–DCM	+ 0"
8	Philippe Gilbert (BEL)	BMC Racing Team	+ 0"
9	Peter Velits (SVK)	Omega Pharma–Quick-Step	+ 0"
10	Danilo Hondo (GER)	Lampre–ISD	+ 0"

General classification after stage 13
Rank	Rider	Team	Time
1	Bradley Wiggins (GBR)	Team Sky	59h 32' 32"
2	Chris Froome (GBR)	Team Sky	+ 2' 05"
3	Vincenzo Nibali (ITA)	Liquigas–Cannondale	+ 2' 23"
4	Cadel Evans (AUS)	BMC Racing Team	+ 3' 19"
5	Jurgen Van den Broeck (BEL)	Lotto–Belisol	+ 4' 48"
6	Haimar Zubeldia (ESP)	RadioShack–Nissan	+ 6' 15"
7	Tejay van Garderen (USA)	BMC Racing Team	+ 6' 57"
8	Janez Brajkovič (SLO)	Astana	+ 7' 30"
9	Pierre Rolland (FRA)	Team Europcar	+ 8' 31"
10	Thibaut Pinot (FRA)	FDJ–BigMat	+ 8' 51"

== Stage 14 ==
15 July 2012 — Limoux to Foix, 191 km (118.7 mi)

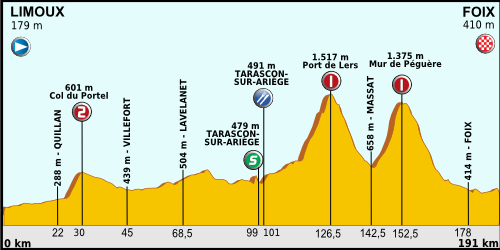
Stage fourteen profile

The race entered the lower Pyrenees with two first-category climbs; the 1,517 m (4,977 ft) Port de Lers and the Mur de Péguère, reaching an elevation of 1,375 m (4,511 ft). The Mur de Péguère was featuring for the first time in the Tour de France; with sections of the climb in excess of 16%. Small attacks set the course of the early running of the stage, with the field remaining as a whole for the first hour of racing after the attacks were closed down shortly after. It was not until a quarter of the way through the stage – some 50 km (31.1 mi) in – that a move was allowed to be established on the road, when eleven riders went clear including the points classification leader Peter Sagan of Liquigas–Cannondale, who was looking to extend his points advantage over his rivals André Greipel (Lotto–Belisol) and Orica–GreenEDGE rider Matthew Goss.

By the time that Sagan had crossed over the intermediate sprint line first, at Tarascon-sur-Ariège, the leaders' advantage was already over thirteen minutes, and was increasing by the kilometre due to the wet conditions on the roads. At the Port de Lers, the eleven riders were fifteen minutes clear when Cyril Gautier (Team Europcar) developed a problem with his bike and had to stop for a change of equipment, losing around 40 seconds to his ten companions. He would not bridge back to them, and ultimately lost fourteen minutes to them by the stage finish. Rabobank's Luis León Sánchez attacked on the Mur de Péguère, with only Philippe Gilbert (BMC Racing Team), Euskaltel–Euskadi rider Gorka Izagirre and Sandy Casar of FDJ–BigMat able to follow originally. Sagan later brought himself back up to the group, before Casar pulled a few seconds clear over the summit.

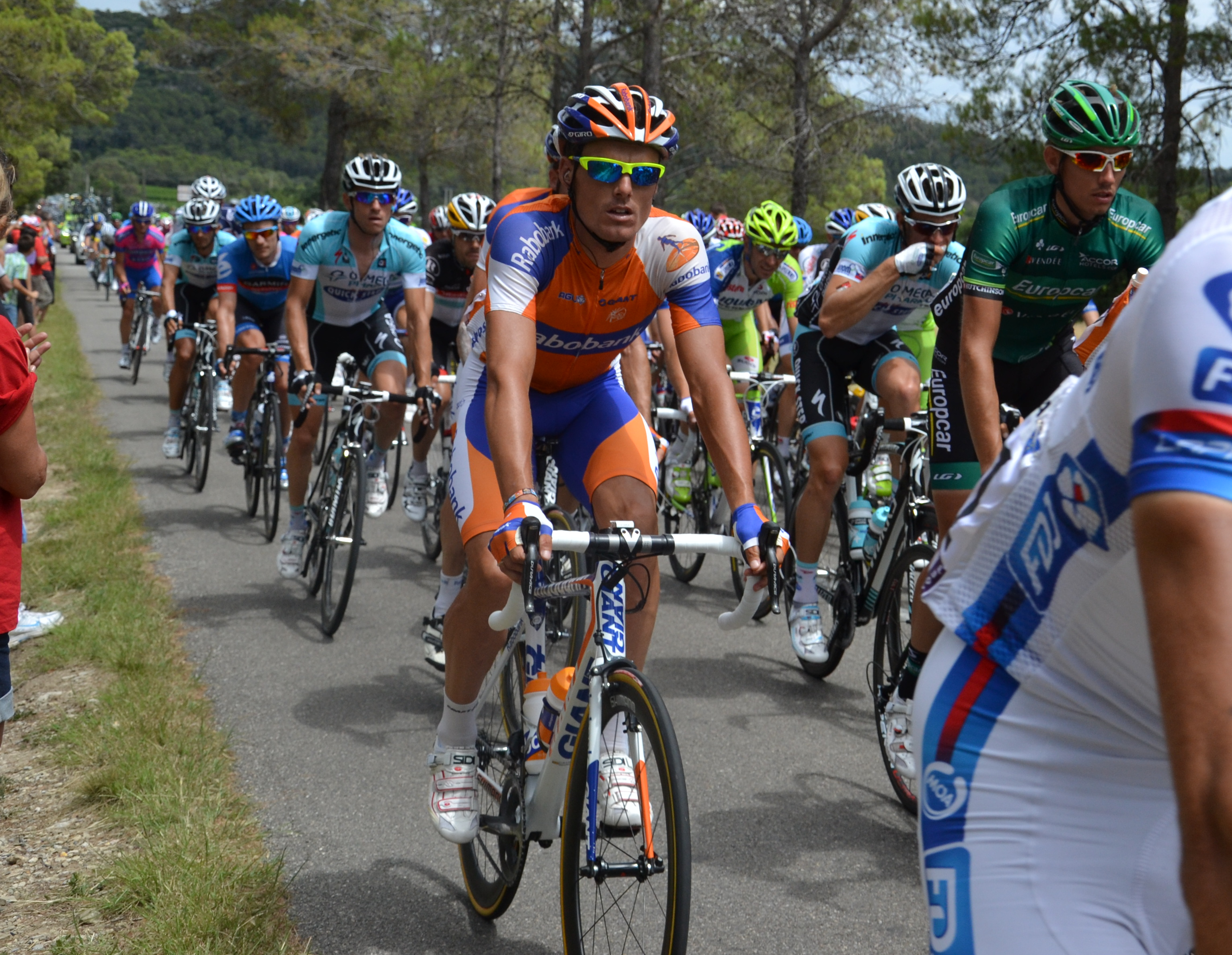
Luis León Sánchez of Rabobank (pictured in the previous stage) was the victor of stage fourteen

At the summit of the climb, carpet tacks were thrown onto the road causing as many as thirty riders to puncture, including Gilbert's team-mates Cadel Evans and Steve Cummings, while race leader Bradley Wiggins (Team Sky) changed his bike as a precaution. As a result, Wiggins called a temporary halt to the racing on the descent. At this time, Pierre Rolland (Team Europcar) attacked and gained a two-minute margin over the peloton, but a combination of the tempo set by Lotto–Belisol and Liquigas–Cannondale, and Rolland realising the situation behind – later apologising for his actions – meant that he was brought back to the field, and they continued to slowly roll towards the finish in Foix. At the front, Sánchez attacked with around 11.5 km (7.1 mi) remaining, and eventually soloed his way to a fourth career stage victory at the Tour. Sagan led home a group of four riders almost a minute behind, while the peloton eventually crossed the line over eighteen minutes behind Sánchez.

Stage 14 result
Rank	Rider	Team	Time
1	Luis León Sánchez (ESP)	Rabobank	4h 50' 29"
2	Peter Sagan (SVK)	Liquigas–Cannondale	+ 47"
3	Sandy Casar (FRA)	FDJ–BigMat	+ 47"
4	Philippe Gilbert (BEL)	BMC Racing Team	+ 47"
5	Gorka Izagirre (ESP)	Euskaltel–Euskadi	+ 47"
6	Sérgio Paulinho (POR)	Saxo Bank–Tinkoff Bank	+ 2' 51"
7	Sébastien Minard (FRA)	Ag2r–La Mondiale	+ 2' 51"
8	Martin Velits (SVK)	Omega Pharma–Quick-Step	+ 3' 49"
9	Eduard Vorganov (RUS)	Team Katusha	+ 4' 51"
10	Steven Kruijswijk (NED)	Rabobank	+ 4' 53"

General classification after stage 14
Rank	Rider	Team	Time
1	Bradley Wiggins (GBR)	Team Sky	64h 41' 16"
2	Chris Froome (GBR)	Team Sky	+ 2' 05"
3	Vincenzo Nibali (ITA)	Liquigas–Cannondale	+ 2' 23"
4	Cadel Evans (AUS)	BMC Racing Team	+ 3' 19"
5	Jurgen Van den Broeck (BEL)	Lotto–Belisol	+ 4' 48"
6	Haimar Zubeldia (ESP)	RadioShack–Nissan	+ 6' 15"
7	Tejay van Garderen (USA)	BMC Racing Team	+ 6' 57"
8	Janez Brajkovič (SLO)	Astana	+ 7' 30"
9	Pierre Rolland (FRA)	Team Europcar	+ 8' 31"
10	Thibaut Pinot (FRA)	FDJ–BigMat	+ 8' 51"

== Stage 15 ==
16 July 2012 — Samatan to Pau, 158.5 km (98.5 mi)

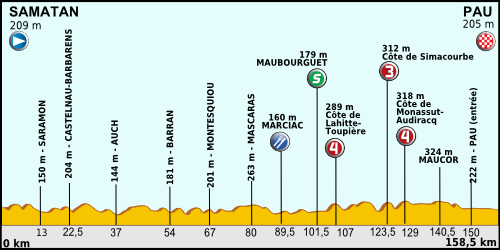
Stage fifteen profile

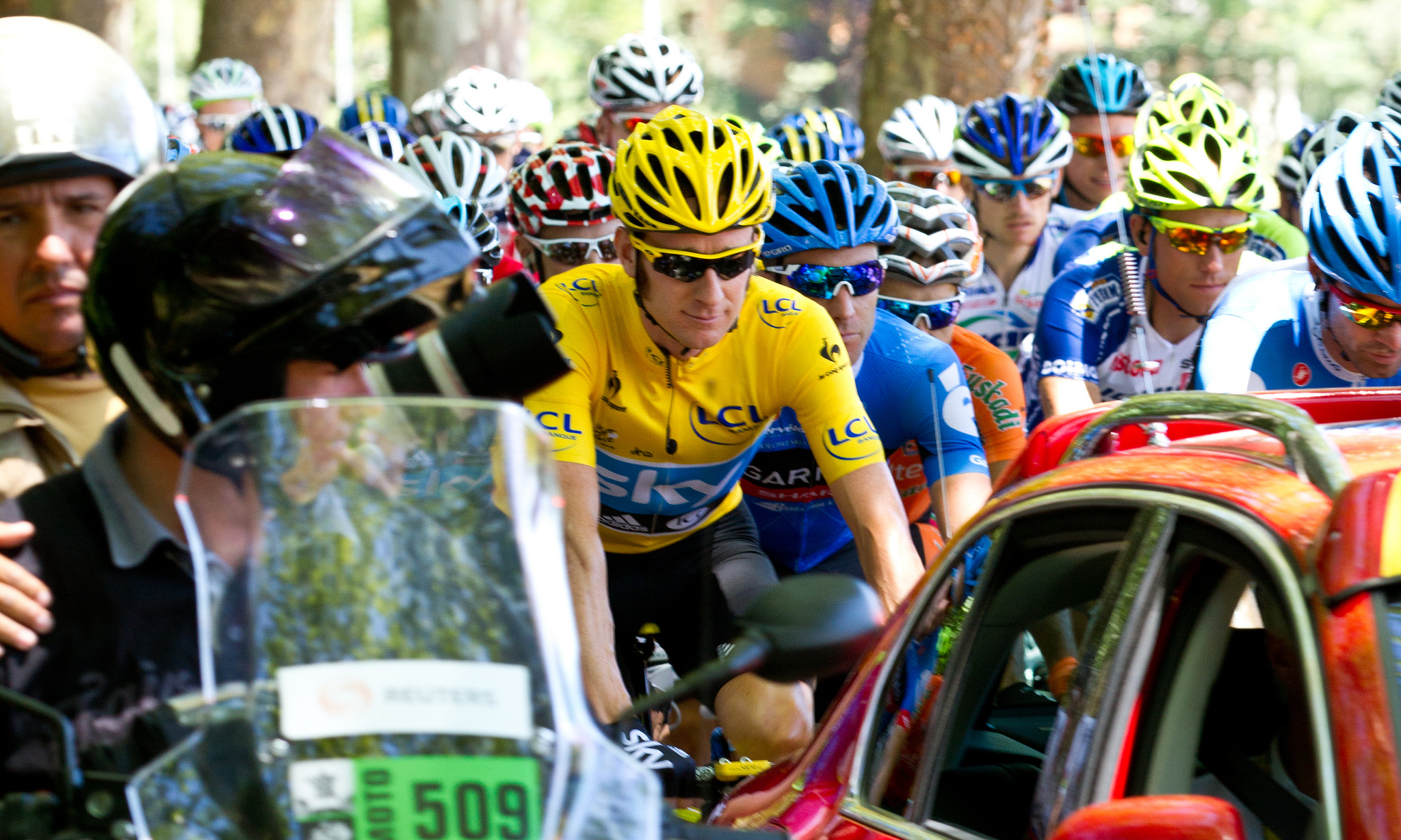
Bradley Wiggins (Team Sky) wearing the race leader's yellow jersey at the start of the stage in Samatan

The stage ran through the foothills of the Pyrenees, in the Gers and Pyrénées-Atlantiques departments. There were three minor climbs in the final third of the stage, which was expected to suit the remaining sprinters. Like the previous day, small attacks set the course of the early running of the stage, with the field remaining as a whole for the first hour of racing after the attacks were unsuccessful. The most prominent of these was a five-rider move, involving Omega Pharma–Quick-Step's Bert Grabsch, Garmin–Sharp rider David Millar, Andriy Hryvko of Astana, Rui Costa (Movistar Team) and Yukiya Arashiro, representing Team Europcar. The peloton did not allow them to gain an advantage of more than 30 seconds, and they were eventually brought back to the main field at the 60 km (37.3 mi) mark.

Another five-rider group formed immediately thereafter, consisting of Christian Vande Velde (Garmin–Sharp), Arashiro's team-mate Thomas Voeckler, FDJ–BigMat's Pierrick Fédrigo, Cofidis rider Samuel Dumoulin and Dries Devenyns of Omega Pharma–Quick-Step. Saxo Bank–Tinkoff Bank rider Nicki Sørensen chased the quintet down for around 20 km (12.4 mi), and eventually made the group a sextet, after his team set the tempo in the main field for a while. The peloton had reduced the gap to the leaders to around five minutes at one point, but eventually decided to allow the breakaway to battle it out for stage honours. Voeckler took maximum points on all three categorised climbs prior to the closing 10 km (6.2 mi), before Sørensen launched the first sustained attacks prior to the finish. However, Fédrigo and Vande Velde gained some ground with their attack at 6.5 km (4.0 mi) to go, and they contested the sprint in Pau; Vande Velde tried to launch his sprint first, but Fédrigo saw the move and remained in front, to take his second stage win in Pau – after a previous victory in 2010 – and fourth of his career. The remaining members of the breakaway came in before the main field, with Lotto–Belisol's André Greipel leading them home 11' 50" down on Fédrigo.

Stage 15 result
Rank	Rider	Team	Time
1	Pierrick Fédrigo (FRA)	FDJ–BigMat	3h 40' 15"
2	Christian Vande Velde (USA)	Garmin–Sharp	+ 0"
3	Thomas Voeckler (FRA)	Team Europcar	+ 12"
4	Nicki Sørensen (DEN)	Saxo Bank–Tinkoff Bank	+ 12"
5	Dries Devenyns (BEL)	Omega Pharma–Quick-Step	+ 21"
6	Samuel Dumoulin (FRA)	Cofidis	+ 1' 08"
7	André Greipel (GER)	Lotto–Belisol	+ 11' 50"
8	Tyler Farrar (USA)	Garmin–Sharp	+ 11' 50"
9	Peter Sagan (SVK)	Liquigas–Cannondale	+ 11' 50"
10	Kris Boeckmans (BEL)	Vacansoleil–DCM	+ 11' 50"

General classification after stage 15
Rank	Rider	Team	Time
1	Bradley Wiggins (GBR)	Team Sky	68h 33' 21"
2	Chris Froome (GBR)	Team Sky	+ 2' 05"
3	Vincenzo Nibali (ITA)	Liquigas–Cannondale	+ 2' 23"
4	Cadel Evans (AUS)	BMC Racing Team	+ 3' 19"
5	Jurgen Van den Broeck (BEL)	Lotto–Belisol	+ 4' 48"
6	Haimar Zubeldia (ESP)	RadioShack–Nissan	+ 6' 15"
7	Tejay van Garderen (USA)	BMC Racing Team	+ 6' 57"
8	Janez Brajkovič (SLO)	Astana	+ 7' 30"
9	Pierre Rolland (FRA)	Team Europcar	+ 8' 31"
10	Thibaut Pinot (FRA)	FDJ–BigMat	+ 8' 51"

== Stage 16 ==
18 July 2012 — Pau to Bagnères-de-Luchon, 197 km (122.4 mi)

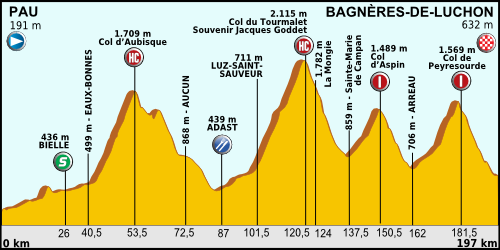
Stage sixteen profile

After the second and final rest day, the race entered the high mountains with the queen stage crossing two hors catégorie climbs – the Col d'Aubisque and the Col du Tourmalet – followed by the first-category climbs of the Col d'Aspin and the Col de Peyresourde, completing the so-called "Circle of Death", before dropping down to the finish in Bagnères-de-Luchon. The first rider over the Tourmalet – the highest point reached in both the Pyrenees and the 2012 Tour as a whole at 2,115 m (6,939 ft) – received the Souvenir Jacques Goddet.

Almost forty riders – around a quarter of the race's peloton at the start of the stage – made it into the early breakaway after around 25 km (15.5 mi), including three riders in the lower reaches of the top twenty placings overall, mountains classification leader Fredrik Kessiakoff (Astana) and stage-winners Thomas Voeckler of Team Europcar and FDJ–BigMat rider Pierrick Fédrigo. Voeckler and Kessiakoff led the group over the top of the Col d'Aubisque, with the group remaining together until the foot of the Col du Tourmalet. Here, the group started to fragment after Garmin–Sharp's Dan Martin accelerated with Kessiakoff and Rabobank's Laurens ten Dam in tow. BMC Racing Team rider George Hincapie, Chris Anker Sørensen of Saxo Bank–Tinkoff Bank and Saur–Sojasun's Brice Feillu later joined the group up front, but only Voeckler and Feillu remained together at the top of the climb, where Voeckler further cut into Kessiakoff's polka-dot jersey lead. The peloton crossed the summit around ten minutes later.

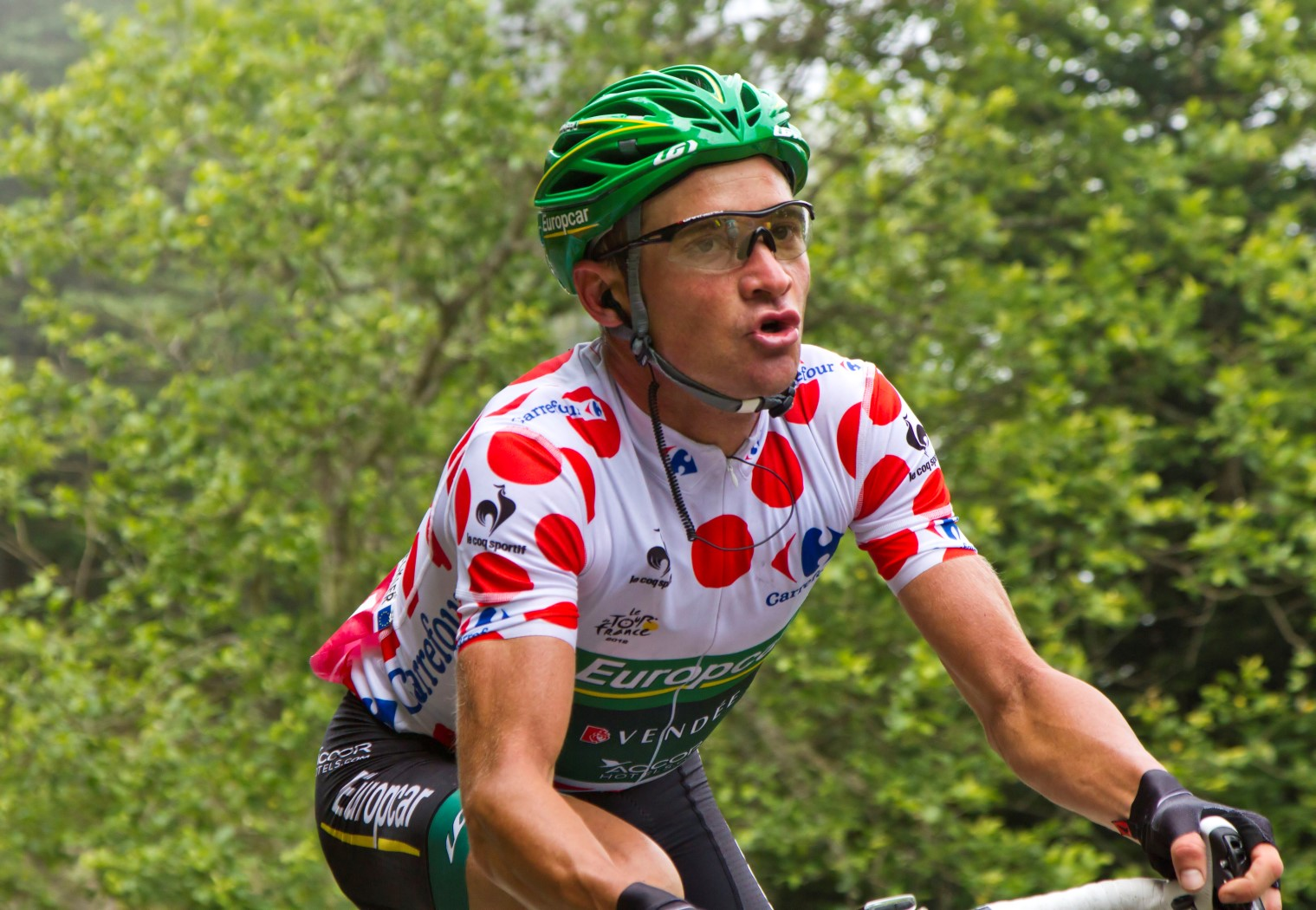
Team Europcar rider Thomas Voeckler (pictured in the next stage) took the polka dot jersey as the leader of the mountains classification, holding it until the conclusion of the Tour.

Voeckler and Feillu had an advantage of almost two minutes at the bottom of the Col d'Aspin, while Martin – on his own after being the last to be dropped by the French pairing out front – was joined by Hincapie and six other riders. With added pressure from Sørensen and RadioShack–Nissan rider Jens Voigt, Kessiakoff was dropped by the group, and aided the efforts for Voeckler to take the lead in the mountains classification. Back in the peloton, the tempo set by Liquigas–Cannondale and Team Sky was reducing the numbers in the group, and eventually, BMC Racing Team's Cadel Evans lost contact on the climb. However, with team-mates around him, he was able to rejoin the group before the final climb of the Col de Peyresourde. A third of the way up the climb, Voeckler left his companion Feillu behind, and set off on a solo attack. Evans again fell off the back of the group, as Vincenzo Nibali (Liquigas–Cannondale) decided to make a preliminary attack on his rivals, Team Sky's Bradley Wiggins and Chris Froome.

Wiggins and Froome were able to make their way back up to Nibali, sandwiching him with Froome on the front and Wiggins at the back of the trio. Voeckler cemented his mountains classification lead by reaching the summit of the Col de Peyresourde first, with the remaining riders of the breakaway spread out between him and the group of Wiggins, Froome and Nibali. Sørensen trailed Voeckler by a minute-and-a-half. Nibali attacked twice more on the steepest part of the climb, but Wiggins shadowed the move and kept himself up with Nibali. At the front, Voeckler descended towards the finish in Bagnères-de-Luchon with a 1' 40" lead over Sørensen, and held the lead to the end for his second stage win of the race, and repeated his 2010 stage victory in the town. Sørensen remained 1' 40" behind in second, while Euskaltel–Euskadi rider Gorka Izagirre bested Alexander Vinokourov (Astana) for third place. Nibali, Wiggins and Froome came in seven minutes after Voeckler, while Evans lost almost five minutes to the trio, falling from fourth to seventh in the general classification behind Lotto–Belisol rider Jurgen Van den Broeck, RadioShack–Nissan's Haimar Zubeldia and his own team-mate Tejay van Garderen. Cofidis rider Jan Ghyselinck finished four seconds outside the stage's cutoff time, but he was given a reprieve by the comissaires to continue in the Tour, making him the new lanterne rouge.

Stage 16 result
Rank	Rider	Team	Time
1	Thomas Voeckler (FRA)	Team Europcar	5h 35' 02"
2	Chris Anker Sørensen (DEN)	Saxo Bank–Tinkoff Bank	+ 1' 40"
3	Gorka Izagirre (ESP)	Euskaltel–Euskadi	+ 3' 22"
4	Alexander Vinokourov (KAZ)	Astana	+ 3' 22"
5	Brice Feillu (FRA)	Saur–Sojasun	+ 3' 58"
6	Jens Voigt (GER)	RadioShack–Nissan	+ 4' 18"
7	Dan Martin (IRE)	Garmin–Sharp	+ 6' 08"
8	Simone Stortoni (ITA)	Lampre–ISD	+ 6' 08"
9	Giampaolo Caruso (ITA)	Team Katusha	+ 6' 08"
10	Laurens ten Dam (NED)	Rabobank	+ 6' 11"

General classification after stage 16
Rank	Rider	Team	Time
1	Bradley Wiggins (GBR)	Team Sky	74h 15' 32"
2	Chris Froome (GBR)	Team Sky	+ 2' 05"
3	Vincenzo Nibali (ITA)	Liquigas–Cannondale	+ 2' 23"
4	Jurgen Van den Broeck (BEL)	Lotto–Belisol	+ 5' 46"
5	Haimar Zubeldia (ESP)	RadioShack–Nissan	+ 7' 13"
6	Tejay van Garderen (USA)	BMC Racing Team	+ 7' 55"
7	Cadel Evans (AUS)	BMC Racing Team	+ 8' 06"
8	Janez Brajkovič (SLO)	Astana	+ 9' 09"
9	Pierre Rolland (FRA)	Team Europcar	+ 10' 10"
10	Thibaut Pinot (FRA)	FDJ–BigMat	+ 11' 43"

== Stage 17 ==
19 July 2012 — Bagnères-de-Luchon to Peyragudes, 143.5 km (89.2 mi)

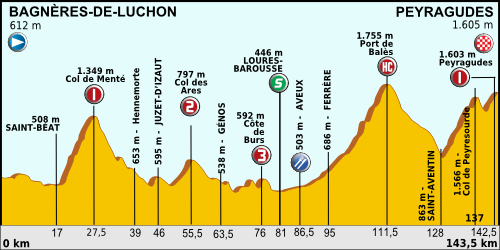
Stage seventeen profile

The final day in the mountains saw the race cross the first-category Col de Menté and the second-category Col des Ares before reaching the last hors catégorie climb of the Tour, the Port de Balès. The race then dropped down, before returning over the uncategorised Col de Peyresourde – crossing the summit for the second consecutive day – followed by a summit finish at the Peyragudes ski resort. With a scheduled parcours of 143.5 km (89.2 mi), the stage was the shortest of the mountain stages of the 2012 Tour.

Small attacks set the course of the early running of the stage, with the field remaining as a whole for the first half-hour of racing after several attacks were closed down before a gap could be established. It was not until the Col de Menté that the early foundations of a breakaway were laid with the two mountains classification combatants, Team Europcar's Thomas Voeckler and Fredrik Kessiakoff of Astana again battling it out for points; Voeckler prevailed ahead of Kessiakoff. The two riders were also a part of a seven-rider breakaway that formed on the descent from the climb. The group was also bolstered for a time by Liquigas–Cannondale rider Vincenzo Nibali, third place in the general classification behind Team Sky duo Bradley Wiggins and Chris Froome, but he eventually sat up from the group as the breakaway was not likely to be given an advantage if Nibali was in the group.

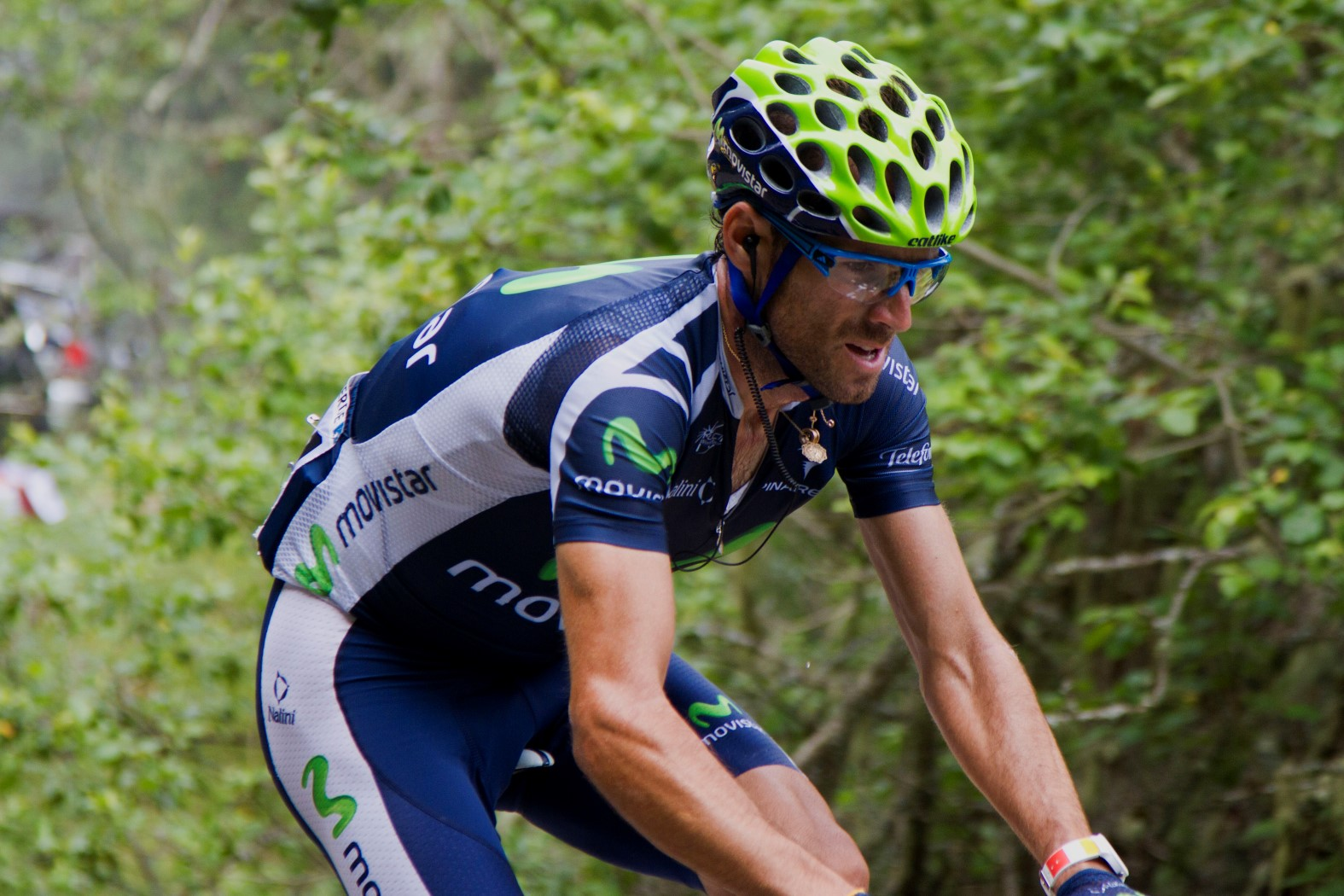
Movistar Team's Alejandro Valverde, as he soloed to the summit finish at the Peyragudes ski resort to win the stage

A ten-rider chase group formed behind the leaders, and eventually joined up with them around halfway through the stage. Voeckler bettered Kessiakoff at the Côte de Burs, to extend his lead in the classification; the peloton were around three minutes behind, but closing gradually. Following a move by a pair of Euskaltel–Euskadi riders, Rui Costa (Movistar Team) attacked out of the group as a set-up for his team leader Alejandro Valverde, who followed his move several kilometres later. Costa paced him for a time before Valverde went clear on his own, and built up a 35-second lead at the summit of the Port de Balès, while the peloton had closed by half a minute to trail him by around two-and-a-half minutes. The peloton caught the group of chasers including Voeckler, Omega Pharma–Quick-Step rider Levi Leipheimer and Blel Kadri of Ag2r–La Mondiale, on the descent with only Valverde remaining ahead as they hit the Col de Peyresourde.

For the second ascent of the Col de Peyresourde during the race, the riders would take the climb in the opposite direction from what they had done on the previous day, before a slight descent and then the final climb to Peyragudes. Valverde held a lead of 1' 20" at the top of the uncategorised pass, with only a handful of riders remaining with the group of the maillot jaune, including the top four in the general classification. Valverde was holding his own off the front, and the gap was fluctuating between 1' 20" and 1' 30" for several kilometres as they neared the summit, which came at the flamme rouge point. Lotto–Belisol's Jurgen Van den Broeck tried to attack, but was pulled back by the Froome and Wiggins tandem, which then accelerated away from their rivals and set off after Valverde. Ultimately, they came up short due to Froome having to wait three times for Wiggins as the race leader was several metres behind his domestique on certain parts of the climb. Valverde achieved his fourth career stage victory at the Tour, nineteen seconds ahead of Froome and Wiggins, who in turn extended their advantage over the rest of the field.

Stage 17 result
Rank	Rider	Team	Time
1	Alejandro Valverde (ESP)	Movistar Team	4h 12' 11"
2	Chris Froome (GBR)	Team Sky	+ 19"
3	Bradley Wiggins (GBR)	Team Sky	+ 19"
4	Thibaut Pinot (FRA)	FDJ–BigMat	+ 22"
5	Pierre Rolland (FRA)	Team Europcar	+ 26"
6	Jurgen Van den Broeck (BEL)	Lotto–Belisol	+ 26"
7	Vincenzo Nibali (ITA)	Liquigas–Cannondale	+ 37"
8	Tejay van Garderen (USA)	BMC Racing Team	+ 54"
9	Chris Horner (USA)	RadioShack–Nissan	+ 1' 02"
10	Dan Martin (IRL)	Garmin–Sharp	+ 1' 11"

General classification after stage 17
Rank	Rider	Team	Time
1	Bradley Wiggins (GBR)	Team Sky	78h 28' 02"
2	Chris Froome (GBR)	Team Sky	+ 2' 05"
3	Vincenzo Nibali (ITA)	Liquigas–Cannondale	+ 2' 41"
4	Jurgen Van den Broeck (BEL)	Lotto–Belisol	+ 5' 53"
5	Tejay van Garderen (USA)	BMC Racing Team	+ 8' 30"
6	Cadel Evans (AUS)	BMC Racing Team	+ 9' 57"
7	Haimar Zubeldia (ESP)	RadioShack–Nissan	+ 10' 11"
8	Pierre Rolland (FRA)	Team Europcar	+ 10' 17"
9	Janez Brajkovič (SLO)	Astana	+ 11' 00"
10	Thibaut Pinot (FRA)	FDJ–BigMat	+ 11' 46"

== Stage 18 ==
20 July 2012 — Blagnac to Brive-la-Gaillarde, 222.5 km (138.3 mi)

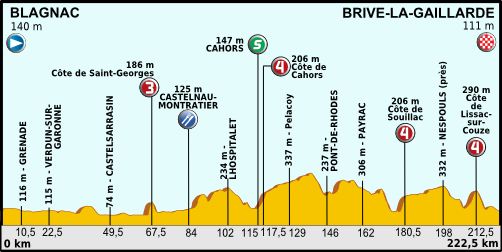
Stage eighteen profile

Despite being ranked a "flat stage", there were four ranked climbs during the day which had the potential to produce a successful break from the peloton. In the early kilometres of the stage, a group of six riders instigated the first breakaway of the day, but after the peloton allowed them to create an advantage on the roads, they were brought back to the confines of the peloton not long later. There was then an uneventful period in the action, with no major attacks going off the front, until the first categorised climb of the day, at the Côte de Saint-Georges.

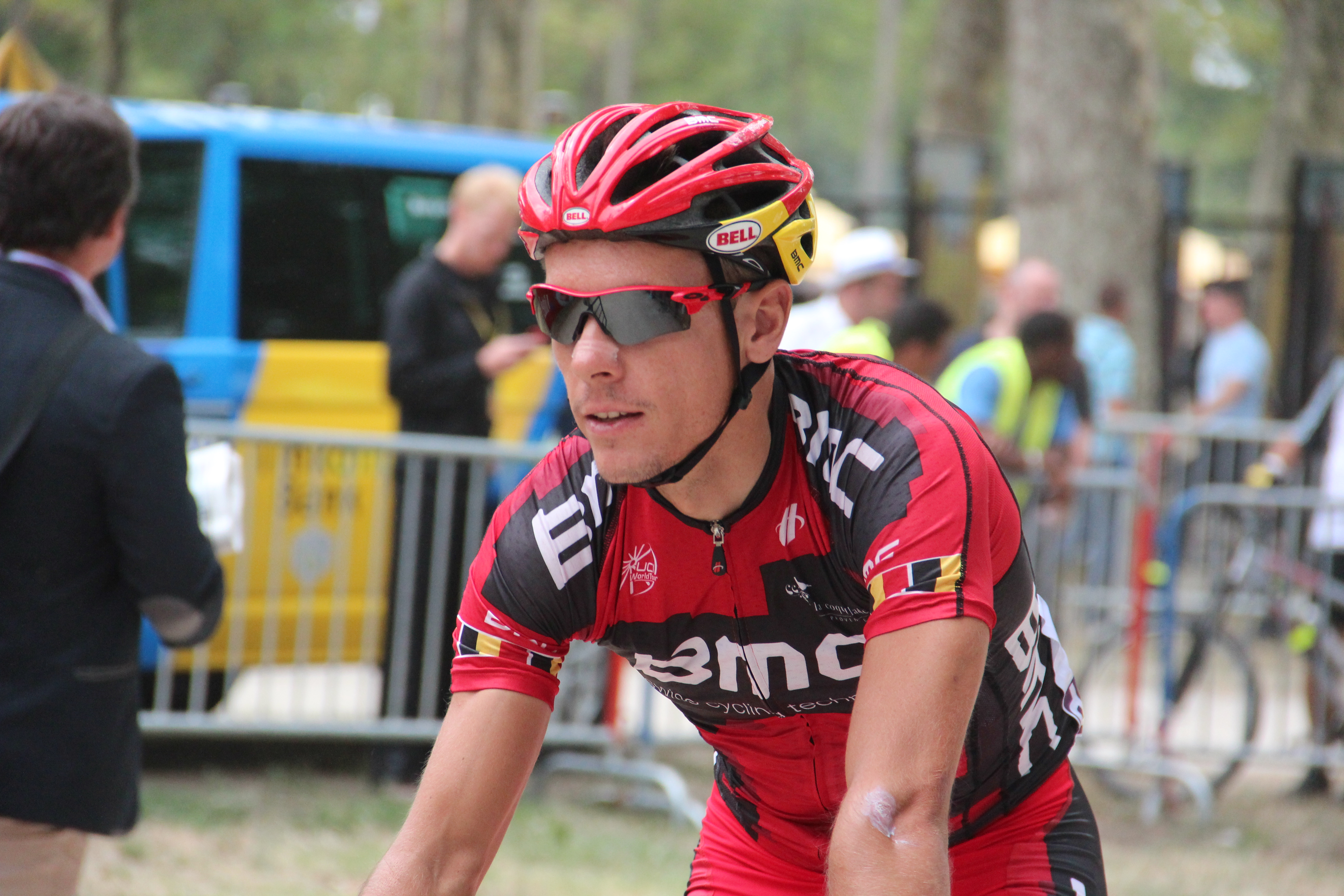
BMC Racing Team's Philippe Gilbert prior to the stage. During the stage, Gilbert had to be restrained, after falling to the ground when a dog ran in front of the peloton.

On the climb itself, Saxo Bank–Tinkoff Bank rider Nick Nuyens and Team Europcar's Yukiya Arashiro attacked up the hill, before they were joined by fourteen other riders to create the second major breakaway of the day's stage. The best-placed rider amongst the group was Rui Costa of the Movistar Team – just under half an hour behind the race leader Bradley Wiggins of Team Sky – who was fresh from his set-up work for team-mate Alejandro Valverde the previous day. Around halfway through the stage, the advantage between the sixteen leaders and the main field reached its highest point of the day, at the 3' 30" mark, before BMC Racing Team and Ag2r–La Mondiale set the tempo to start bringing the leaders back to the peloton. In the peloton, several riders fell to the ground after a dog ran into their path, slowing the pace as a whole. Among those involved was BMC Racing Team's Philippe Gilbert, who had to be restrained when back on his feet. Liquigas–Cannondale sent their riders forward to set the pace on the front of the group in the hopes of setting Peter Sagan up for a fourth stage victory of the race, and the gap reduced under two minutes inside of 50 km (31.1 mi) remaining.

At the head of the race, Garmin–Sharp's David Millar attacked on the Côte de Souillac, where moves from Arashiro and Wiggins' team-mate Edvald Boasson Hagen followed not long later. Five riders – Lotto–Belisol rider Adam Hansen, Alexander Vinokourov of Astana, Nuyens, Luca Paolini (Team Katusha) and FDJ–BigMat's Jérémy Roy – came together at the bottom of the Côte de Lissac-sur-Couze, before Nuyens and Roy were dropped on the climb. They were replaced in the group by Ag2r–La Mondiale's Nicolas Roche, RadioShack–Nissan rider Andreas Klöden and Luis León Sánchez of Rabobank, with the six riders remaining together off the front into the finishing straight in Brive-la-Gaillarde. Roche and Sánchez attacked for the line, but both riders were usurped by the finish of Team Sky sprinter Mark Cavendish following a lead-out from Boasson Hagen. Cavendish went around the outside of the pairing and took his 22nd Tour stage victory on the line, matching the tallies of Lance Armstrong, (Note: In June 2012, the United States Anti-Doping Agency (USADA) accused Lance Armstrong with to doping and trafficking of drugs. Armstrong filed a lawsuit, but a judge ruled in favour of USADA. He was charged in August 2012, and he did not challenge the USADA allegations. On 22 October 2012, the Union Cycliste Internationale (UCI) upheld USADA's decision; all results earned from August 1998 were forfeited, including his seven overall Tour victories and twenty of his twenty-two stage victories.) and André Darrigade for fourth place in the all-time Tour stage wins list, and tying Darrigade's record for victories by a sprinter. Orica–GreenEDGE's Matthew Goss and Sagan also managed to get ahead of Sánchez and Roche in the closing stages, for second and third places respectively, but were around ten lengths behind Cavendish at the finish.

Stage 18 result
Rank	Rider	Team	Time
1	Mark Cavendish (GBR)	Team Sky	4h 54' 12"
2	Matthew Goss (AUS)	Orica–GreenEDGE	+ 0"
3	Peter Sagan (SVK)	Liquigas–Cannondale	+ 0"
4	Luis León Sánchez (ESP)	Rabobank	+ 0"
5	Nicolas Roche (IRL)	Ag2r–La Mondiale	+ 0"
6	Tyler Farrar (USA)	Garmin–Sharp	+ 0"
7	Borut Božič (SLO)	Astana	+ 0"
8	Sébastien Hinault (FRA)	Ag2r–La Mondiale	+ 0"
9	Daryl Impey (RSA)	Orica–GreenEDGE	+ 0"
10	Samuel Dumoulin (FRA)	Cofidis	+ 0"

General classification after stage 18
Rank	Rider	Team	Time
1	Bradley Wiggins (GBR)	Team Sky	83h 22' 18"
2	Chris Froome (GBR)	Team Sky	+ 2' 05"
3	Vincenzo Nibali (ITA)	Liquigas–Cannondale	+ 2' 41"
4	Jurgen Van den Broeck (BEL)	Lotto–Belisol	+ 5' 53"
5	Tejay van Garderen (USA)	BMC Racing Team	+ 8' 30"
6	Cadel Evans (AUS)	BMC Racing Team	+ 9' 57"
7	Haimar Zubeldia (ESP)	RadioShack–Nissan	+ 10' 11"
8	Pierre Rolland (FRA)	Team Europcar	+ 10' 17"
9	Janez Brajkovič (SLO)	Astana	+ 11' 00"
10	Thibaut Pinot (FRA)	FDJ–BigMat	+ 11' 46"

== Stage 19 ==
21 July 2012 — Bonneval to Chartres, 53.5 km (33.2 mi), (ITT)

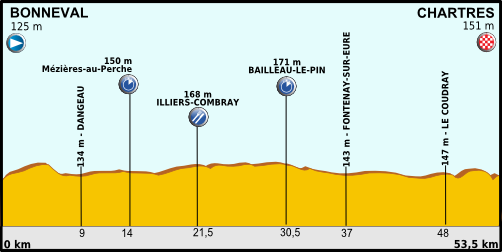
Stage nineteen profile

The penultimate stage of the Tour was the final individual time trial with good roads into the centre of the city of Chartres. With other noted specialists within the time trial discipline having already abandoned the race, the top two riders in the general classification – Team Sky pairing Bradley Wiggins and Chris Froome – were expected to be the favourites for the stage, having finished first and second in the ninth stage time trial. As was customary of time trial stages, the riders set off in reverse order from where they were ranked in the general classification at the end of the previous stage. Thus, Jimmy Engoulvent of Saur–Sojasun, who, in 153rd place, trailed overall leader Wiggins by 3 hours, 49 minutes and 9 seconds, was the first rider to set off on the stage.

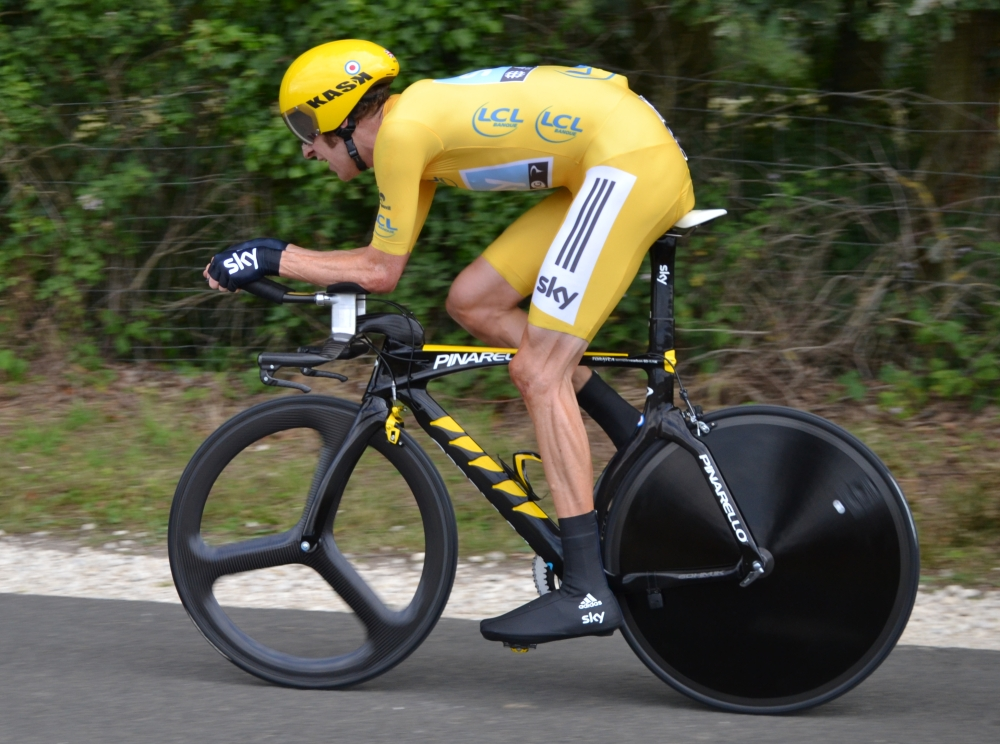
Race leader Bradley Wiggins won his second stage of the race, beating Team Sky team-mate Chris Froome by one minute and sixteen seconds.

Engoulvent recorded a time of 1 hour, 12 minutes and 49 seconds for the course as he was first to reach the line; but his lead was short-lived as several minutes later, Cofidis rider Julien Fouchard went round the course over two minutes quicker than the time of Engoulvent. Garmin–Sharp's Johan Vansummeren was the first rider to record a time below 1 hour and 10 minutes with a time of 1 hour, 9 minutes and 24 seconds, before Argos–Shimano rider Patrick Gretsch recorded a time almost three minutes quicker, having passed the two riders that started directly before him – at one-minute intervals – on the course, and another on the finish line. Gretsch's time held for a considerable amount of time – around 2 hours – and was ultimately good enough for him to place sixth in the final stage results. It was not until the 88th rider to start the course that his time was beaten. Luis León Sánchez of Rabobank set the best time at each of the three intermediate time-checks along the 53.5 km (33.2 mi) parcours and eventually crossed the finish line in a time of 1 hour, 6 minutes and 3 seconds, to surpass Gretsch's time by thirty-eight seconds.

The Spanish national champion's time held right into the final riders to take to the course, now at three-minute intervals for the last 14 riders. BMC Racing Team's Tejay van Garderen, the holder of the white jersey for the young rider classification leader, went beneath Sánchez's time at the first split, but faded on the rest of the course and eventually finished 44 seconds outside of his time in third place. He had already passed his team-mate Cadel Evans, who had started three minutes ahead, on course, and the Boulder, Colorado native later dedicated his performance to the victims of the shooting in nearby Aurora. Only Froome and Wiggins beat the time of van Garderen at the first time-point, with Wiggins beating Froome by a dozen seconds; Wiggins continued to extend his lead on course, holding a 54-second buffer at the second time-check, and 1' 15" at the third. Froome crossed the line in a time of 1 hour, 5 minutes and 29 seconds to beat Sánchez's time by 34 seconds, but Wiggins achieved his second stage win of the race, adding one second to his advantage between the third time-check and the finish; punching the air as he crossed the finish line. The only change in positions for the general classification inside the top ten was Evans being passed for sixth place by RadioShack–Nissan's Haimar Zubeldia – despite nearly hitting a barrier during his pass through the course – by a margin of eight seconds.

Stage 19 result
Rank	Rider	Team	Time
1	Bradley Wiggins (GBR)	Team Sky	1h 04' 13"
2	Chris Froome (GBR)	Team Sky	+ 1' 16"
3	Luis León Sánchez (ESP)	Rabobank	+ 1' 50"
4	Peter Velits (SVK)	Omega Pharma–Quick-Step	+ 2' 02"
5	Richie Porte (AUS)	Team Sky	+ 2' 25"
6	Patrick Gretsch (GER)	Argos–Shimano	+ 2' 28"
7	Tejay van Garderen (USA)	BMC Racing Team	+ 2' 34"
8	Vasil Kiryienka (BLR)	Movistar Team	+ 2' 46"
9	Rein Taaramäe (EST)	Cofidis	+ 2' 50"
10	Jérémy Roy (FRA)	FDJ–BigMat	+ 3' 05"

General classification after stage 19
Rank	Rider	Team	Time
1	Bradley Wiggins (GBR)	Team Sky	84h 26' 31"
2	Chris Froome (GBR)	Team Sky	+ 3' 21"
3	Vincenzo Nibali (ITA)	Liquigas–Cannondale	+ 6' 19"
4	Jurgen Van den Broeck (BEL)	Lotto–Belisol	+ 10' 15"
5	Tejay van Garderen (USA)	BMC Racing Team	+ 11' 04"
6	Haimar Zubeldia (ESP)	RadioShack–Nissan	+ 15' 43"
7	Cadel Evans (AUS)	BMC Racing Team	+ 15' 51"
8	Pierre Rolland (FRA)	Team Europcar	+ 16' 31"
9	Janez Brajkovič (SLO)	Astana	+ 16' 38"
10	Thibaut Pinot (FRA)	FDJ–BigMat	+ 17' 17"

== Stage 20 ==
22 July 2012 — Rambouillet to Paris (Champs-Élysées), 120 km (74.6 mi)

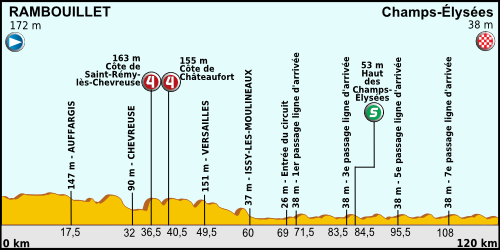
Stage twenty profile

The Tour concluded with the now-customary stage finish on the Champs-Élysées in Paris. The stage had an easy start – with two fourth-category climbs 5 km (3.1 mi) apart, inside the first third of the stage – before eight high-speed laps, followed by the finish, which was expected to result in a sprint for the line. In keeping with tradition, the final stage began at a slow pace, and was a largely ceremonial procession through the suburbs of Paris. Shortly after the riders reached the circuit in the centre of the city, racing began in earnest, and after various unsuccessful attempts, the main break was initiated by Jens Voigt (RadioShack–Nissan) and Lampre–ISD's Danilo Hondo with around 40 km (24.9 mi) to go.

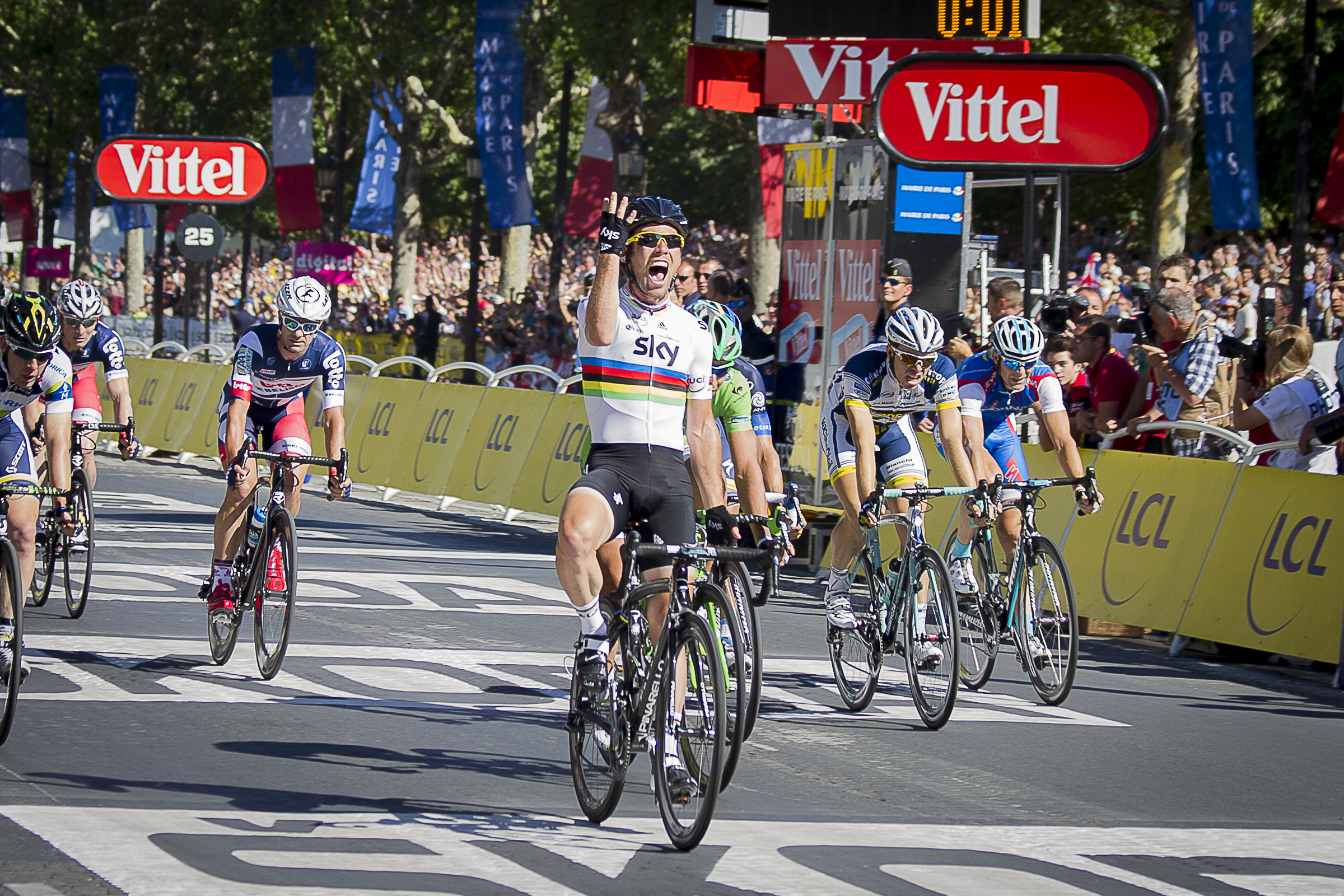
Team Sky's Mark Cavendish crossing the finish line to take his fourth consecutive victory in the Champs-Élysées stage

Hondo led the field across the final intermediate sprint point of the race, with Voigt just behind. Hondo did not remain out front however, as Voigt was eventually joined by ten other riders to form the breakaway, with their advantage eventually reaching a maximum of around thirty seconds in the closing stages. Hondo later crashed on the final lap, along with Ag2r–La Mondiale rider Mikaël Cherel, but both riders eventually remounted to finish the stage. As the peloton closed down the leaders' advantage, mainly through the work of Team Sky, Liquigas–Cannondale and Saxo Bank–Tinkoff Bank, the breakaway lost members, until they were all caught with 3 km (1.9 mi) remaining. The lead-out train for Mark Cavendish (Team Sky), which included race leader Wiggins, held the lead of the race through the final corners, and he won the final stage for the fourth successive year, becoming the first incumbent world champion to win on the Champs-Élysées. His 23rd stage victory allowed him to move into fourth place on the all-time Tour stage wins list, while the leaders of the four classifications finished in the peloton to secure their victories, and the traditional prize-giving was made shortly after the race.

Stage 20 result
Rank	Rider	Team	Time
1	Mark Cavendish (GBR)	Team Sky	3h 08' 07"
2	Peter Sagan (SVK)	Liquigas–Cannondale	+ 0"
3	Matthew Goss (AUS)	Orica–GreenEDGE	+ 0"
4	Juan José Haedo (ARG)	Saxo Bank–Tinkoff Bank	+ 0"
5	Kris Boeckmans (BEL)	Vacansoleil–DCM	+ 0"
6	Greg Henderson (NZL)	Lotto–Belisol	+ 0"
7	Borut Božič (SLO)	Astana	+ 0"
8	André Greipel (GER)	Lotto–Belisol	+ 0"
9	Edvald Boasson Hagen (NOR)	Team Sky	+ 0"
10	Jimmy Engoulvent (FRA)	Saur–Sojasun	+ 0"

Final general classification
Rank	Rider	Team	Time
1	Bradley Wiggins (GBR)	Team Sky	87h 34' 47"
2	Chris Froome (GBR)	Team Sky	+ 3' 21"
3	Vincenzo Nibali (ITA)	Liquigas–Cannondale	+ 6' 19"
4	Jurgen Van den Broeck (BEL)	Lotto–Belisol	+ 10' 15"
5	Tejay van Garderen (USA)	BMC Racing Team	+ 11' 04"
6	Haimar Zubeldia (ESP)	RadioShack–Nissan	+ 15' 41"
7	Cadel Evans (AUS)	BMC Racing Team	+ 15' 49"
8	Pierre Rolland (FRA)	Team Europcar	+ 16' 26"
9	Janez Brajkovič (SLO)	Astana	+ 16' 33"
10	Thibaut Pinot (FRA)	FDJ–BigMat	+ 17' 17"

== Notes and references ==
=== Sources ===
- "Race regulations" (PDF). Tour de France. Amaury Sport Organisation. 2015. Archived from the original (PDF) on 14 July 2015.
