= Davézieux =

- Commune
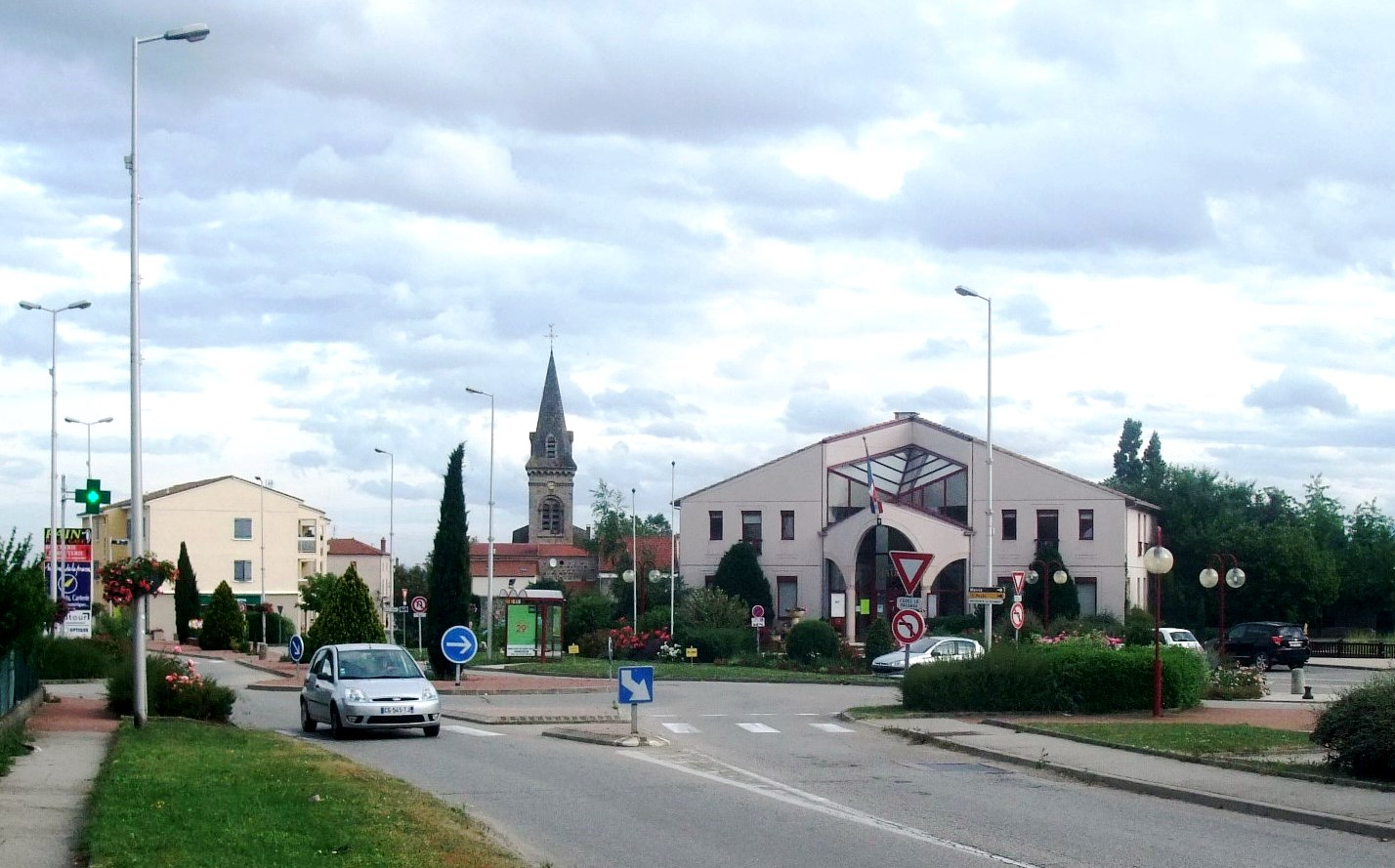
- The town hall and the centre of Davézieux

- Coat of arms
- Location of Davézieux
- Location within France Location within Auvergne-Rhône-Alpes
- Coordinates: 45°15′21″N 4°42′29″E
- Country: France
- Region: Auvergne-Rhône-Alpes
- Department: Ardèche
- Arrondissement: Tournon-sur-Rhône
- Canton: Annonay-1
- Intercommunality: Annonay Rhône Agglo

Government
  - Mayor (2020–2026): Gilles Dufaud
- Area^{1}: 5.59 km^{2} (2.16 sq mi)
- Elevation: 440 m (1,440 ft)
- Highest elevation: 458 m (1,503 ft)
- Lowest elevation: 352 m (1,155 ft)
- Population (2023): 3,205
  - Density: 573/km^{2} (1,480/sq mi)
- Time zone: UTC+01:00 (CET)
  - Summer (DST): UTC+02:00 (CEST)
- INSEE/Postal code: 07078 /07430
- ^{1} French Land Register data, which excludes lakes, ponds, glaciers > 1 km^{2} (0.386 sq mi or 247 acres) and river estuaries.

Davézieux (French pronunciation: [davezjø]; Occitan: Davesiu) is a commune in the Ardèche department in southern France.

== Population ==
Historical population
Year	Pop.	±% p.a.
1968	1,191	—
1975	1,309	+1.36%
1982	1,776	+4.45%
1990	2,371	+3.68%
1999	2,629	+1.15%
2007	2,801	+0.80%
2012	3,032	+1.60%
2017	3,162	+0.84%
2023	3,205	+0.23%
Source: INSEE

== See also ==
- Communes of the Ardèche department
