= Aper =

Aper may refer to:

== People ==
- Aper (grammarian), 1st century Greek grammarian
- Marcus Aper, 1st century Roman orator
- Trosius Aper, 2nd century Roman grammarian and Latin tutor to Marcus Aurelius
- Gaius Septimius Severus Aper (ca. 175–211/212), Roman consul
- Lucius Flavius Aper (d. 284), Roman soldier, acting governor and Praetorian prefect
- Aprus of Toul (d. 507), bishop of Toul
- Aprus of Sens (fl. 7th century), French saint
- Aper Aku (1938–1988), Nigerian politician
- Khnko Aper, pen name of Armenian writer and poet Atabek Khnkoyan (1870–1935)

== Music ==
- The Apers, a Dutch pop punk band

== Other ==
- Apir, a traditional folding hand fan of the Maranao people of the Philippines.

== See also ==
- Aprus (disambiguation)
