= Arrondissement of Saint-Jean-de-Maurienne =

Coordinates: 45°16′22″N 6°20′54″E

Saint-Jean-de-Maurienne
- Arrondissement
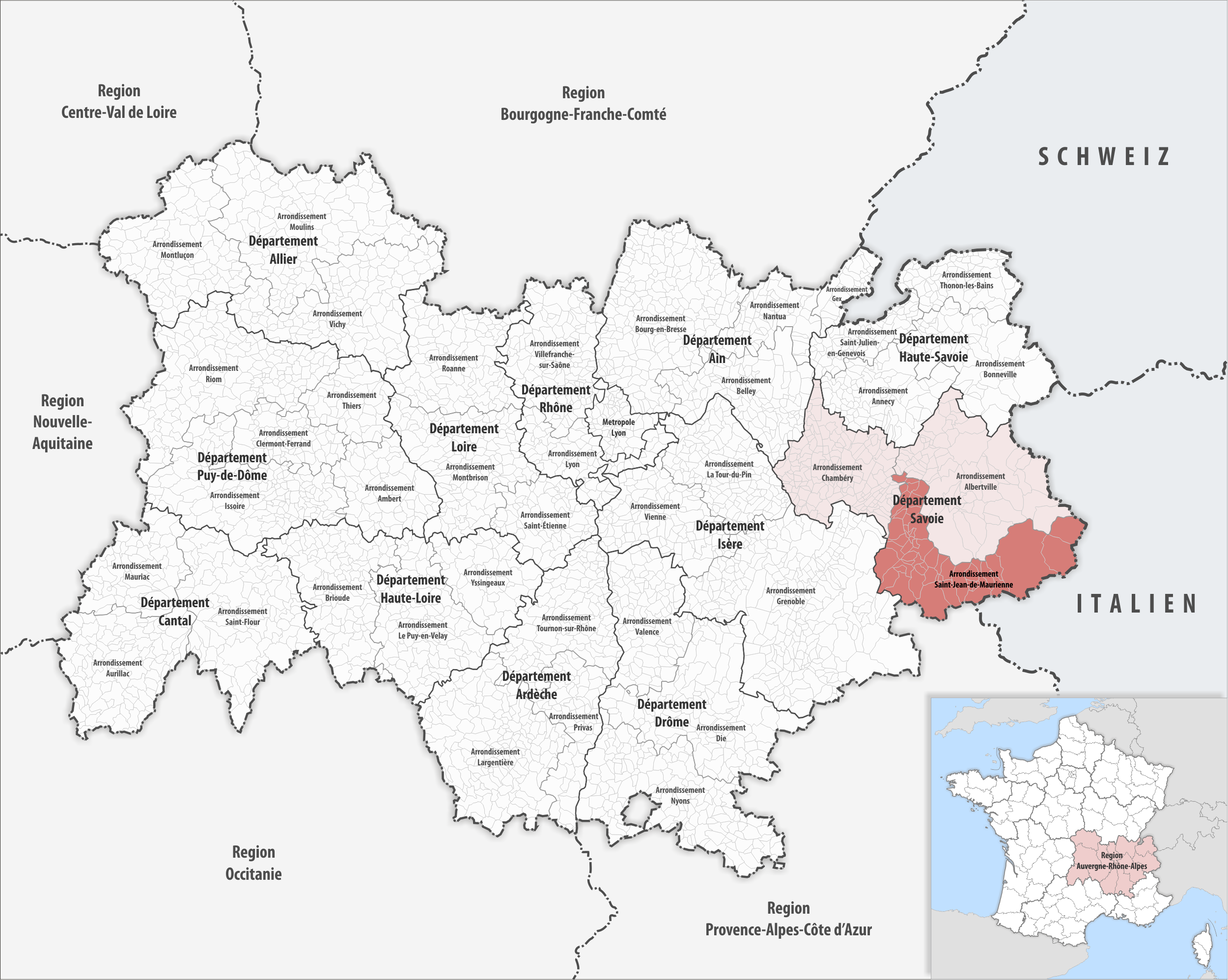
- Location within the region Auvergne-Rhône-Alpes
- Country: France
- Region: Auvergne-Rhône-Alpes
- Department: Savoie
- No. of communes: {{{nbcomm}}}
- Area: 1,976.0 km^{2} (762.9 sq mi)
- Population (2023): 42,710
  - Density: 21.61/km^{2} (55.98/sq mi)
- INSEE code: 733

The arrondissement of Saint-Jean-de-Maurienne is an arrondissement of France in the Savoie department in the Auvergne-Rhône-Alpes region. It has 53 communes. Its population is 42,689 (2021), and its area is 1,976.0 km^{2} (762.9 sq mi). The area corresponds to the former province of Maurienne.

== Composition ==
The 53 communes of the arrondissement of Saint-Jean-de-Maurienne, and their INSEE codes, are:

- Aiton (73007)
- Albiez-Montrond (73013)
- Albiez-le-Jeune (73012)
- Argentine (73019)
- Aussois (73023)
- Avrieux (73026)
- Bessans (73040)
- Bonneval-sur-Arc (73047)
- Bonvillaret (73049)
- La Chambre (73067)
- La Chapelle (73074)
- Les Chavannes-en-Maurienne (73083)
- Épierre (73109)
- Fontcouverte-la-Toussuire (73116)
- Fourneaux (73117)
- Freney (73119)
- Jarrier (73138)
- Modane (73157)
- Montgilbert (73168)
- Montricher-Albanne (73173)
- Montsapey (73175)
- Montvernier (73177)
- Notre-Dame-du-Cruet (73189)
- Orelle (73194)
- Saint-Alban-d'Hurtières (73220)
- Saint-Alban-des-Villards (73221)
- Saint-André (73223)
- Saint-Avre (73224)
- Saint-Colomban-des-Villards (73230)
- Saint-Etienne-de-Cuines (73231)
- Saint-François-Longchamp (73235)
- Saint-Georges-d'Hurtières (73237)
- Saint-Jean-d'Arves (73242)
- Saint-Jean-de-Maurienne (73248)
- Saint-Julien-Mont-Denis (73250)
- Saint-Léger (73252)
- Saint-Martin-d'Arc (73256)
- Saint-Martin-de-la-Porte (73258)
- Saint-Martin-sur-la-Chambre (73259)
- Saint-Michel-de-Maurienne (73261)
- Saint-Pancrace (73267)
- Saint-Pierre-de-Belleville (73272)
- Saint-Rémy-de-Maurienne (73278)
- Saint-Sorlin-d'Arves (73280)
- Sainte-Marie-de-Cuines (73255)
- La Tour-en-Maurienne (73135)
- Val-Cenis (73290)
- Val-d'Arc (73212)
- Valloire (73306)
- Valmeinier (73307)
- Villarembert (73318)
- Villargondran (73320)
- Villarodin-Bourget (73322)

== History ==
The arrondissement of Saint-Jean-de-Maurienne was created in 1860.

As a result of the reorganisation of the cantons of France which came into effect in 2015, the borders of the cantons are no longer related to the borders of the arrondissements. The cantons of the arrondissement of Saint-Jean-de-Maurienne were, as of January 2015:

1. Aiguebelle
2. La Chambre
3. Lanslebourg-Mont-Cenis
4. Modane
5. Saint-Jean-de-Maurienne
6. Saint-Michel-de-Maurienne
