= Jarrier =

Jarrier Zharyé (Savoyard)
- Commune
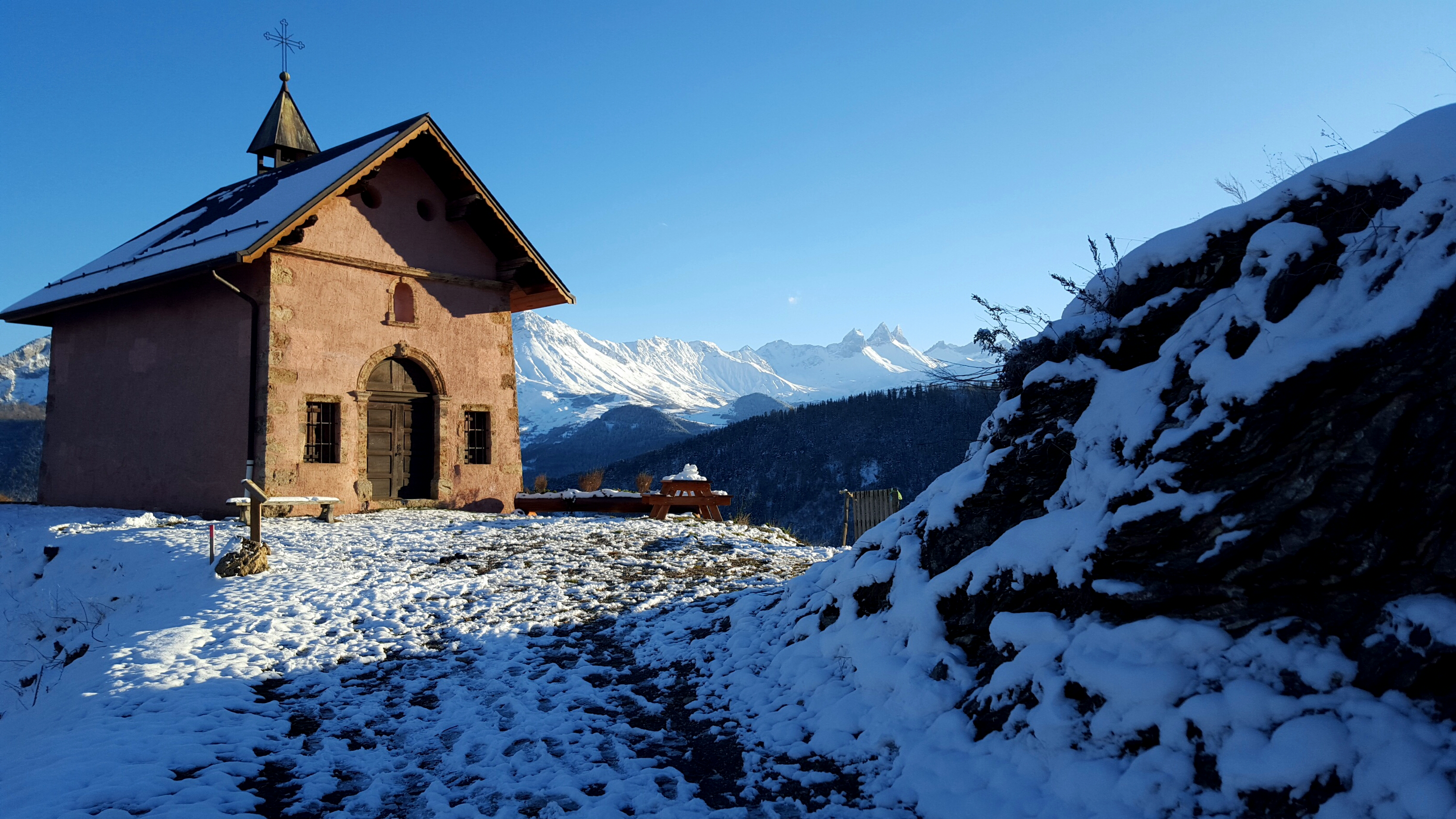
- The Saint-Roch Chapel in 2015
- Location of Jarrier
- Location within France Location within Auvergne-Rhône-Alpes
- Coordinates: 45°16′52″N 6°19′03″E
- Country: France
- Region: Auvergne-Rhône-Alpes
- Department: Savoie
- Arrondissement: Saint-Jean-de-Maurienne
- Canton: Saint-Jean-de-Maurienne

Government
  - Mayor (2020–2026): Marc Picton
- Area^{1}: 17.79 km^{2} (6.87 sq mi)
- Highest elevation: 2,173 m (7,129 ft)
- Lowest elevation: 760 m (2,490 ft)
- Population (2023): 506
  - Density: 28.4/km^{2} (73.7/sq mi)
- Time zone: UTC+01:00 (CET)
  - Summer (DST): UTC+02:00 (CEST)
- INSEE/Postal code: 73138 /73300
- ^{1} French Land Register data, which excludes lakes, ponds, glaciers > 1 km^{2} (0.386 sq mi or 247 acres) and river estuaries.

Jarrier (French pronunciation: [ʒaʁje]; Savoyard: Zharyé) is a commune in the Savoie department in the Auvergne-Rhône-Alpes region in south-eastern France.

== Geography ==
=== Climate ===
According to a 2010 study by the French National Centre for Scientific Research, the commune is situated in a "mountain climate". In 2020, Météo-France published its own typology of French climates in which it categorized the commune's climate as a mountain climate or mountain margins climate within the Northern Alps climate region.

From 1971 to 2000, the average annual temperature was 8.3 °C (46.9 °F), with an annual range of 17.4 °C (63.3 °F). The average annual rainfall was 1,156 millimetres (45.5 in), with 9.7 days of rainfall in January and 8.9 days of rainfall in July.

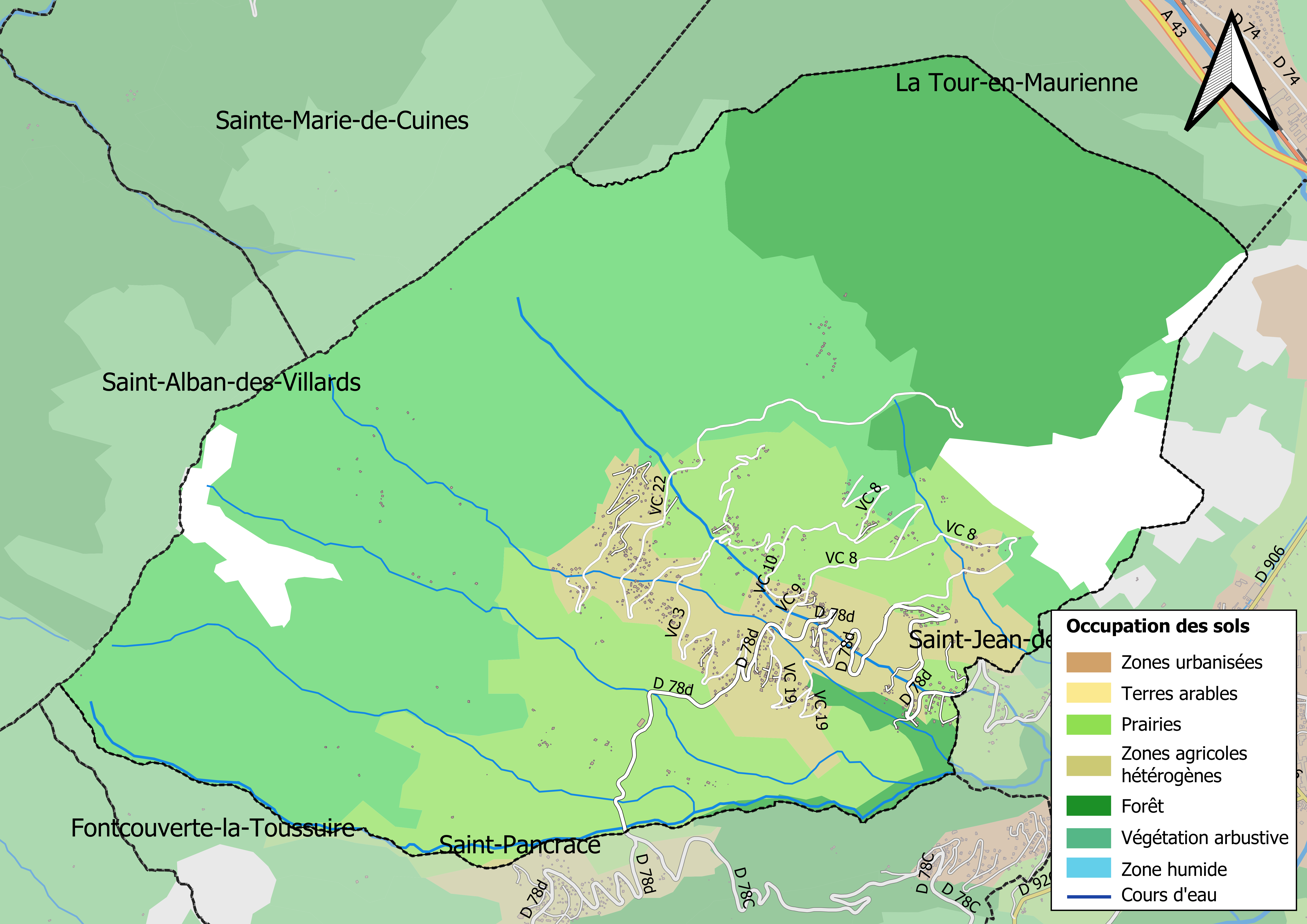
Map of the commune's infrastructure and land use in 2018

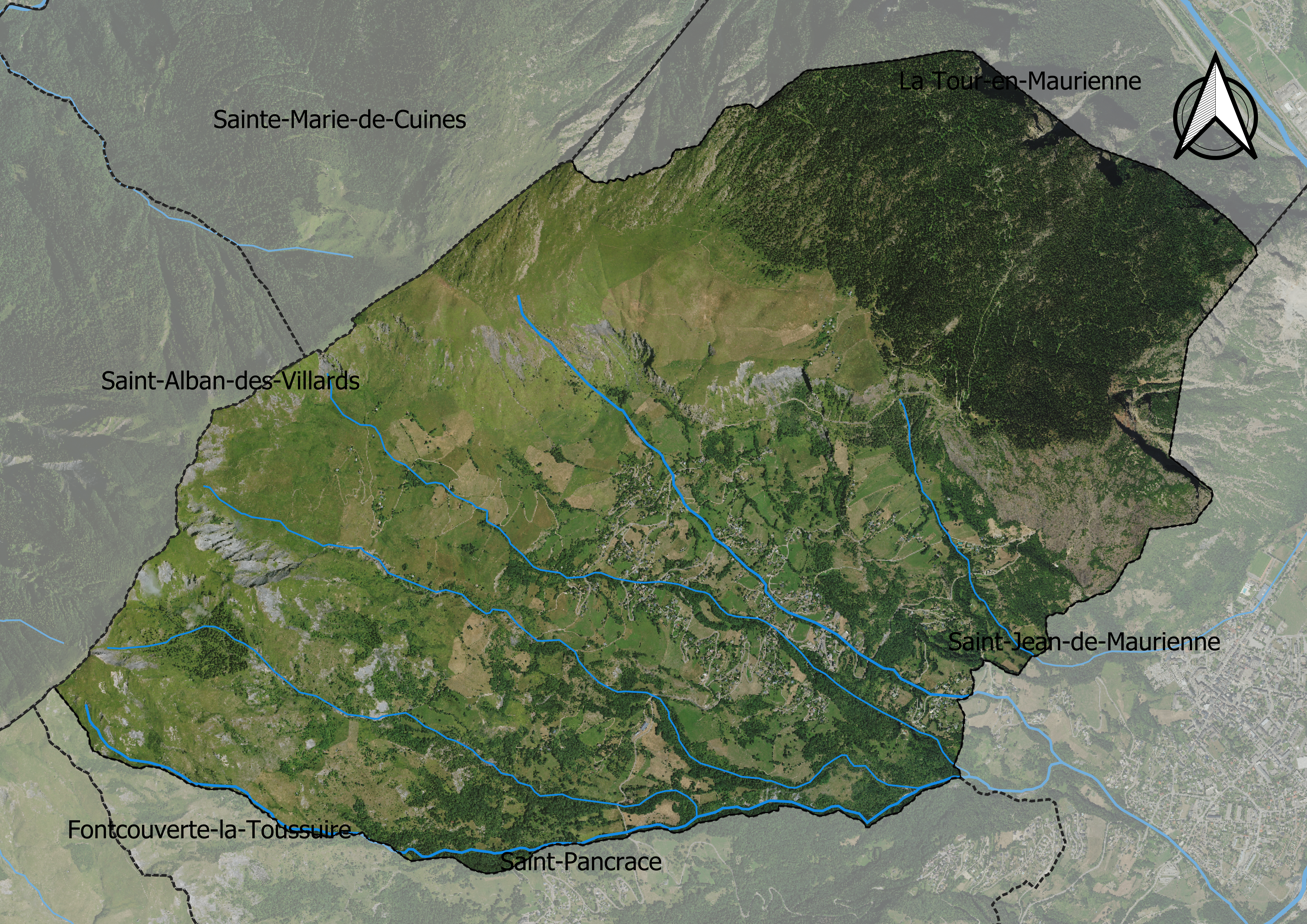
Satellite image of the commune

== Demographics ==
As of 2023, the population of the commune was 506. The age distribution was skewed towards the elderly, with 13.5% of the population aged 14 and under, 9.3% aged 15−29, 16% aged 30−44, 22.4% aged 45−59, 27.4% aged 60−74, and 11.5% aged 75 or higher. Since 2015, the population of the 60−74 and 75+ age ranges had increased while the younger age ranges had decreased in population.

The commune had 153 single-family households, 56.1% of which were couples without children. 37.3% were couples with children, and a further 6.6% were single-parent households. 87.8% of permanent residences were owned by their occupants, while 9.7% were rented. The median disposable household income was €26,000.

== See also ==
- Communes of the Savoie department
