= Les Chavannes-en-Maurienne =

Les Chavannes-en-Maurienne Lè Shavane (Savoyard)
- Commune
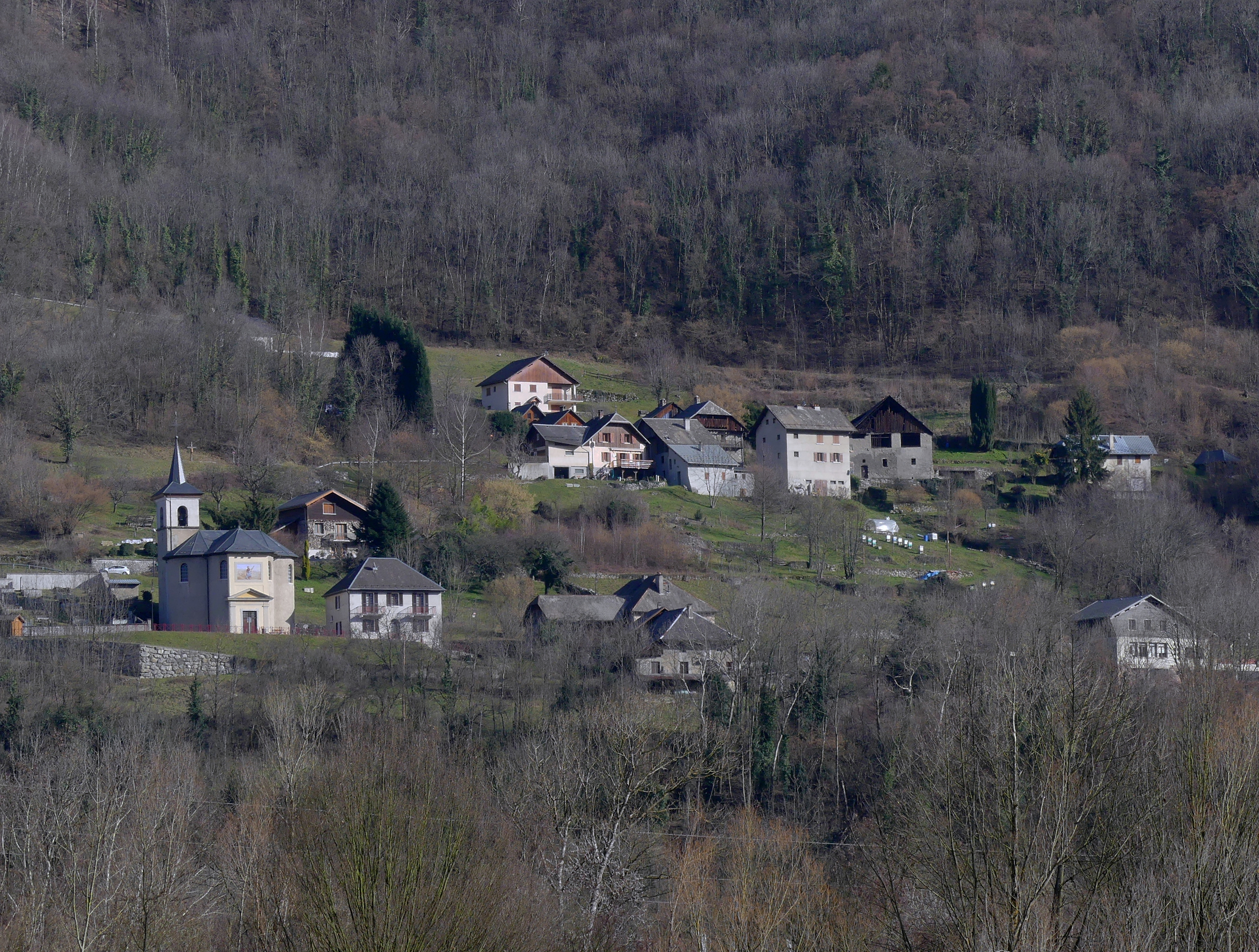
- Location of Les Chavannes-en-Maurienne
- Location within France Location within Auvergne-Rhône-Alpes
- Coordinates: 45°23′31″N 6°16′58″E
- Country: France
- Region: Auvergne-Rhône-Alpes
- Department: Savoie
- Arrondissement: Saint-Jean-de-Maurienne
- Canton: Saint-Jean-de-Maurienne

Government
  - Mayor (2020–2026): Joël Cecille
- Area^{1}: 4.69 km^{2} (1.81 sq mi)
- Highest elevation: 1,240 m (4,070 ft)
- Lowest elevation: 407 m (1,335 ft)
- Population (2023): 220
  - Density: 47/km^{2} (120/sq mi)
- Demonym: Chavannains
- Time zone: UTC+01:00 (CET)
  - Summer (DST): UTC+02:00 (CEST)
- INSEE/Postal code: 73083 /73660
- Website: www.les-chavannes.com
- ^{1} French Land Register data, which excludes lakes, ponds, glaciers > 1 km^{2} (0.386 sq mi or 247 acres) and river estuaries.

Les Chavannes-en-Maurienne (French pronunciation: [le ʃavan ɑ̃ mɔʁjɛn], lit. 'Les Chavannes-in-Maurienne'; Savoyard: Lè Shavane) is a rural commune in the Savoie department in the Auvergne-Rhône-Alpes region in southeastern France.

== See also ==
- Communes of the Savoie department
