= Montricher-Albanne =

Montricher-Albanne Morshèl-Arban-no (Savoyard)
- Commune
- Location of Montricher-Albanne
- Location within France Location within Auvergne-Rhône-Alpes
- Coordinates: 45°14′50″N 6°24′10″E
- Country: France
- Region: Auvergne-Rhône-Alpes
- Department: Savoie
- Arrondissement: Saint-Jean-de-Maurienne
- Canton: Saint-Jean-de-Maurienne

Government
  - Mayor (2020–2026): Sophie Verney
- Area^{1}: 27.99 km^{2} (10.81 sq mi)
- Highest elevation: 2,926 m (9,600 ft)
- Lowest elevation: 600 m (2,000 ft)
- Population (2023): 476
  - Density: 17.0/km^{2} (44.0/sq mi)
- Time zone: UTC+01:00 (CET)
  - Summer (DST): UTC+02:00 (CEST)
- INSEE/Postal code: 73173 /73870
- Website: www.montricher-albanne.fr
- ^{1} French Land Register data, which excludes lakes, ponds, glaciers > 1 km^{2} (0.386 sq mi or 247 acres) and river estuaries.

Montricher-Albanne (Savoyard: Morshèl-Arban-no) is a commune in the Savoie department in the Auvergne-Rhône-Alpes region in south-eastern France, near the border of Italy.

== See also ==
- Communes of the Savoie department
