= Albiez-le-Jeune =

Albiez-le-Jeune Arbyié (Savoyard)
- Commune
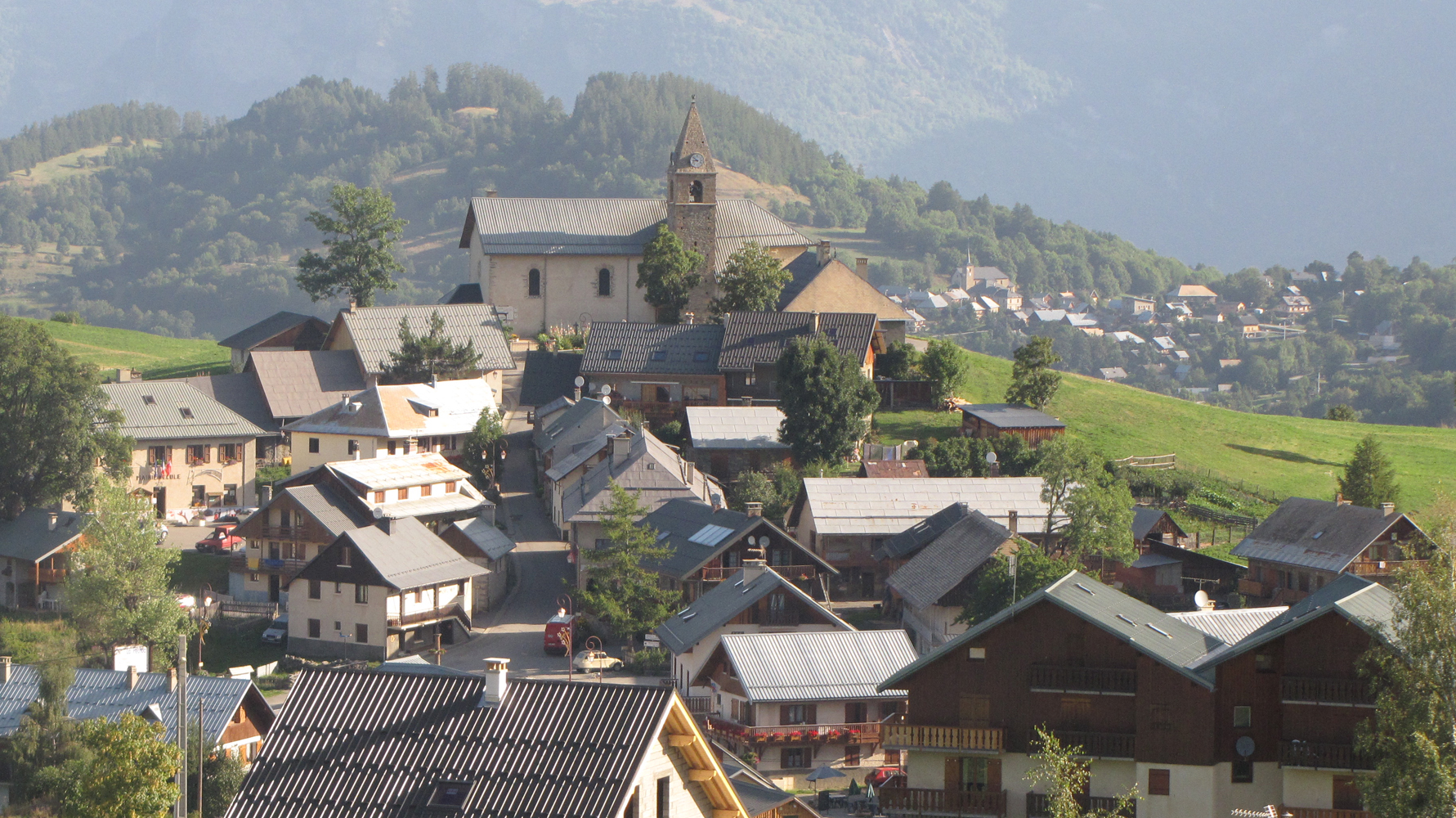
- Albiez-Montrond in the foreground, with Albiez-le-Jeune in the background
- Location of Albiez-le-Jeune
- Location within France Location within Auvergne-Rhône-Alpes
- Coordinates: 45°14′45″N 6°21′08″E
- Country: France
- Region: Auvergne-Rhône-Alpes
- Department: Savoie
- Arrondissement: Saint-Jean-de-Maurienne
- Canton: Saint-Jean-de-Maurienne
- Intercommunality: Cœur de Maurienne Arvan

Government
  - Mayor (2020–2026): Jean-Marc Blangy
- Area^{1}: 12.45 km^{2} (4.81 sq mi)
- Highest elevation: 2,428 m (7,966 ft)
- Lowest elevation: 714 m (2,343 ft)
- Population (2023): 139
  - Density: 11.2/km^{2} (28.9/sq mi)
- Time zone: UTC+01:00 (CET)
  - Summer (DST): UTC+02:00 (CEST)
- INSEE/Postal code: 73012 /73300
- ^{1} French Land Register data, which excludes lakes, ponds, glaciers > 1 km^{2} (0.386 sq mi or 247 acres) and river estuaries.

Albiez-le-Jeune (Savoyard: Arbyié) is a commune in the Savoie department in the Auvergne-Rhône-Alpes region in south-eastern France.

== Population ==
Historical population
| Year | Pop. | ±% p.a. |
|---|---|---|
| 1968 | 95 | — |
| 1975 | 81 | −2.25% |
| 1982 | 78 | −0.54% |
| 1990 | 61 | −3.03% |
| 1999 | 57 | −0.75% |
| 2007 | 104 | +7.81% |
| 2012 | 141 | +6.28% |
| 2017 | 146 | +0.70% |
| 2023 | 139 | −0.82% |
Source: INSEE

== See also ==
- Communes of the Savoie department
