= Saint-Martin-sur-la-Chambre =

- Commune
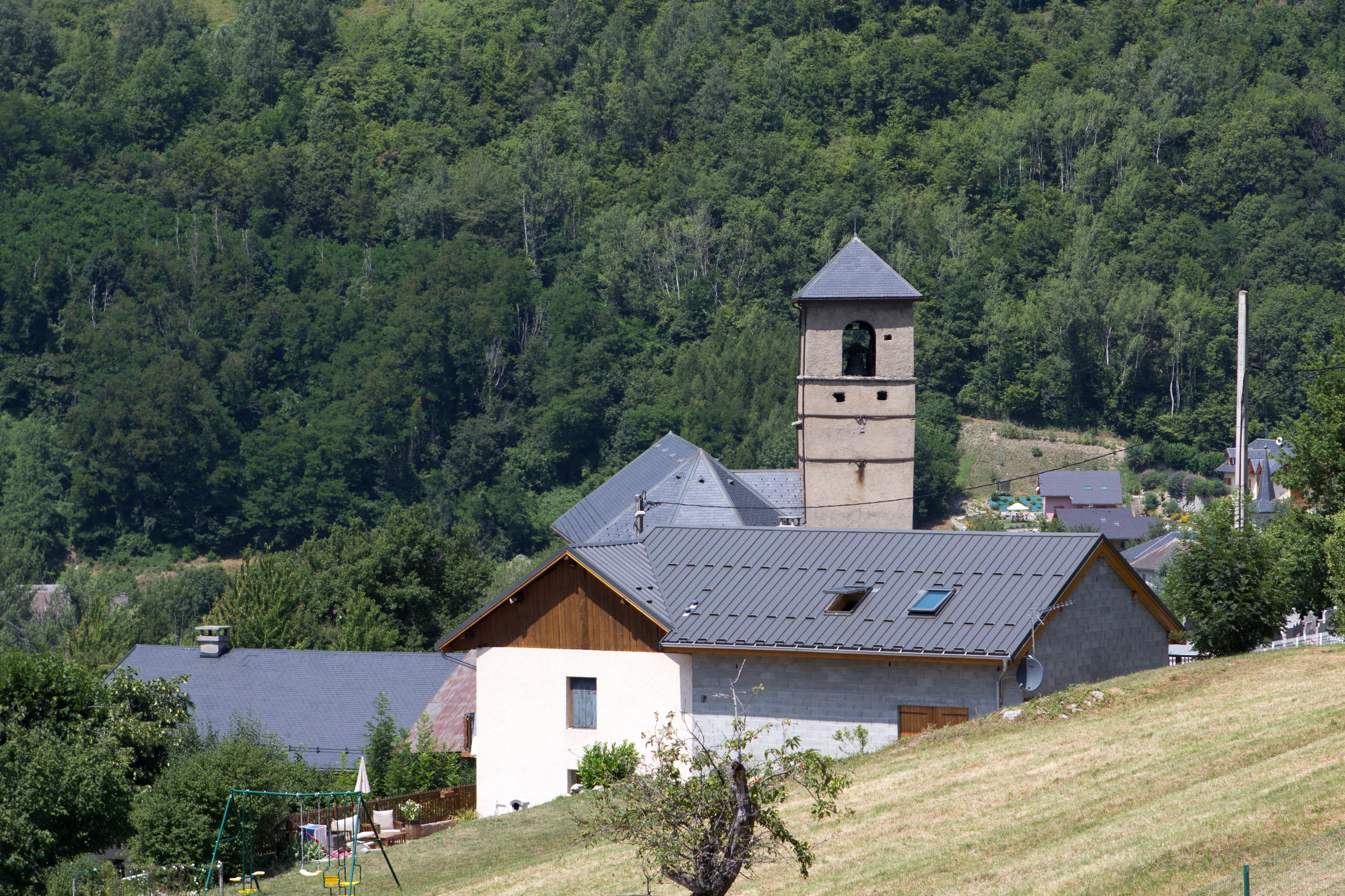
- The church in Saint-Martin-sur-La-Chambre
- Location of Saint-Martin-sur-la-Chambre
- Location within France Location within Auvergne-Rhône-Alpes
- Coordinates: 45°21′58″N 6°19′03″E
- Country: France
- Region: Auvergne-Rhône-Alpes
- Department: Savoie
- Arrondissement: Saint-Jean-de-Maurienne
- Canton: Saint-Jean-de-Maurienne

Government
  - Mayor (2020–2026): Lionel Combet
- Area^{1}: 4.69 km^{2} (1.81 sq mi)
- Highest elevation: 1,200 m (3,900 ft)
- Lowest elevation: 492 m (1,614 ft)
- Population (2023): 525
  - Density: 112/km^{2} (290/sq mi)
- Time zone: UTC+01:00 (CET)
  - Summer (DST): UTC+02:00 (CEST)
- INSEE/Postal code: 73259 /73130
- ^{1} French Land Register data, which excludes lakes, ponds, glaciers > 1 km^{2} (0.386 sq mi or 247 acres) and river estuaries.

Saint-Martin-sur-la-Chambre (French pronunciation: [sɛ̃ maʁtɛ̃ syʁ la ʃɑ̃bʁ], lit. 'Saint-Martin on La Chambre'; Arpitan: Sin Martïn) is a commune in the Savoie department in the Auvergne-Rhône-Alpes region in south-eastern France.

== See also ==
- Communes of the Savoie department
