= Aprus =

Aprus (French: Apre, Epvre, Evre or Avre) is a Latin masculine given name that may refer to:

- Aprus of Reims, archbishop of Reims from 328 to 350
- Aprus of Toul (died 507), bishop of Toul
- Aprus of Sens, 7th-century saint, priest and hermit
- Aprus, a deity or hero posited by Jacob Grimm as the namesake for the month of April
- Aprus (Thrace), an ancient Thracian town, later a Roman city

== See also ==
- Apris, in Sanskrit a special invocation related to an animal sacrifice
- Aper (disambiguation), an alternate spelling of Aprus
