= Notre-Dame-du-Cruet =

Notre-Dame-du-Cruet Le Kruè (Savoyard)
- Commune
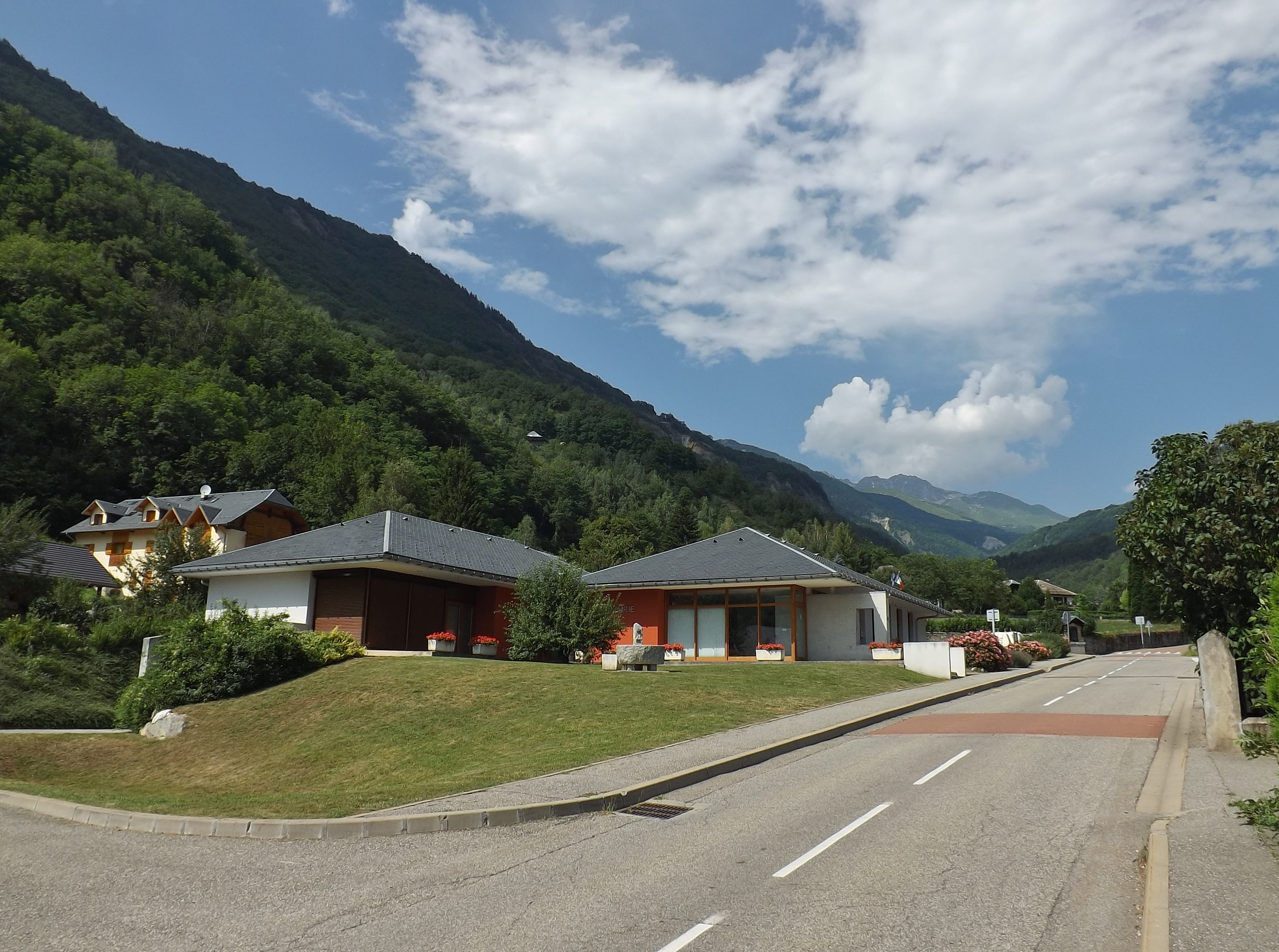
- The town hall in Notre-Dame-du-Cruet
- Location of Notre-Dame-du-Cruet
- Location within France Location within Auvergne-Rhône-Alpes
- Coordinates: 45°22′16″N 6°18′44″E
- Country: France
- Region: Auvergne-Rhône-Alpes
- Department: Savoie
- Arrondissement: Saint-Jean-de-Maurienne
- Canton: Saint-Jean-de-Maurienne

Government
  - Mayor (2020–2026): Laure Pion
- Area^{1}: 1.9 km^{2} (0.73 sq mi)
- Highest elevation: 1,100 m (3,600 ft)
- Lowest elevation: 499 m (1,637 ft)
- Population (2023): 222
  - Density: 120/km^{2} (300/sq mi)
- Time zone: UTC+01:00 (CET)
  - Summer (DST): UTC+02:00 (CEST)
- INSEE/Postal code: 73189 /73130
- ^{1} French Land Register data, which excludes lakes, ponds, glaciers > 1 km^{2} (0.386 sq mi or 247 acres) and river estuaries.

Notre-Dame-du-Cruet (Savoyard: Le Kruè) is a commune in the Savoie department in the Auvergne-Rhône-Alpes region in south-eastern France.

== See also ==
- Communes of the Savoie department
