= Villargondran =

Villargondran Vlâgondrène (Savoyard)
- Commune
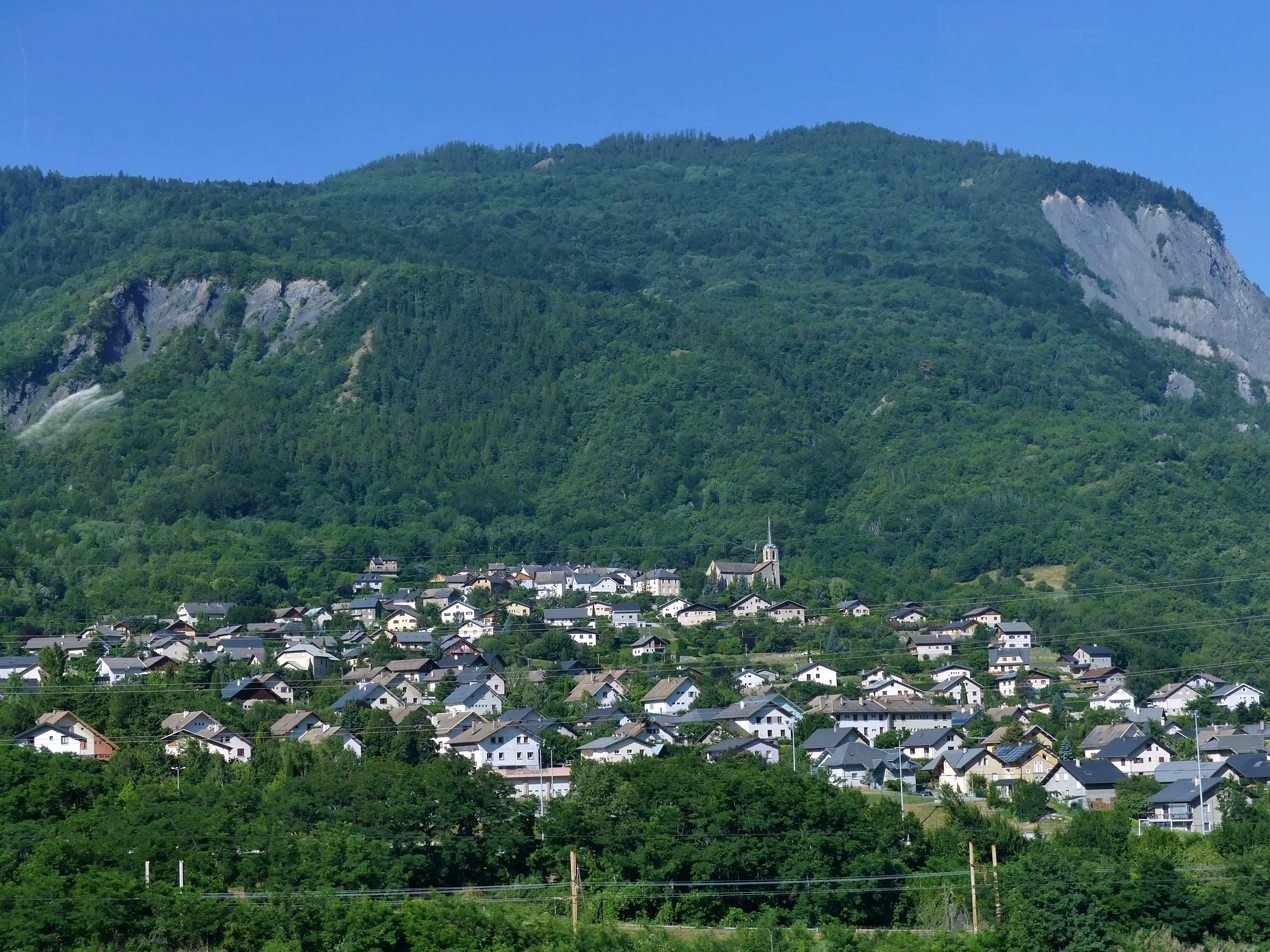
- A general view of Villargondran
- Location of Villargondran
- Location within France Location within Auvergne-Rhône-Alpes
- Coordinates: 45°15′42″N 6°22′30″E
- Country: France
- Region: Auvergne-Rhône-Alpes
- Department: Savoie
- Arrondissement: Saint-Jean-de-Maurienne
- Canton: Saint-Jean-de-Maurienne

Government
  - Mayor (2020–2026): Philippe Rossi
- Area^{1}: 6.12 km^{2} (2.36 sq mi)
- Highest elevation: 1,454 m (4,770 ft)
- Lowest elevation: 544 m (1,785 ft)
- Population (2023): 790
  - Density: 130/km^{2} (330/sq mi)
- Time zone: UTC+01:00 (CET)
  - Summer (DST): UTC+02:00 (CEST)
- INSEE/Postal code: 73320 /73300
- Website: www.mairie-villargondran.fr
- ^{1} French Land Register data, which excludes lakes, ponds, glaciers > 1 km^{2} (0.386 sq mi or 247 acres) and river estuaries.

Villargondran (Savoyard: Vlâgondrène) is a commune in the Savoie department in the Auvergne-Rhône-Alpes region in south-eastern France.

== See also ==
- Communes of the Savoie department
