= La Chapelle, Savoie =

La Chapelle La Shapéla (Savoyard)
- Commune
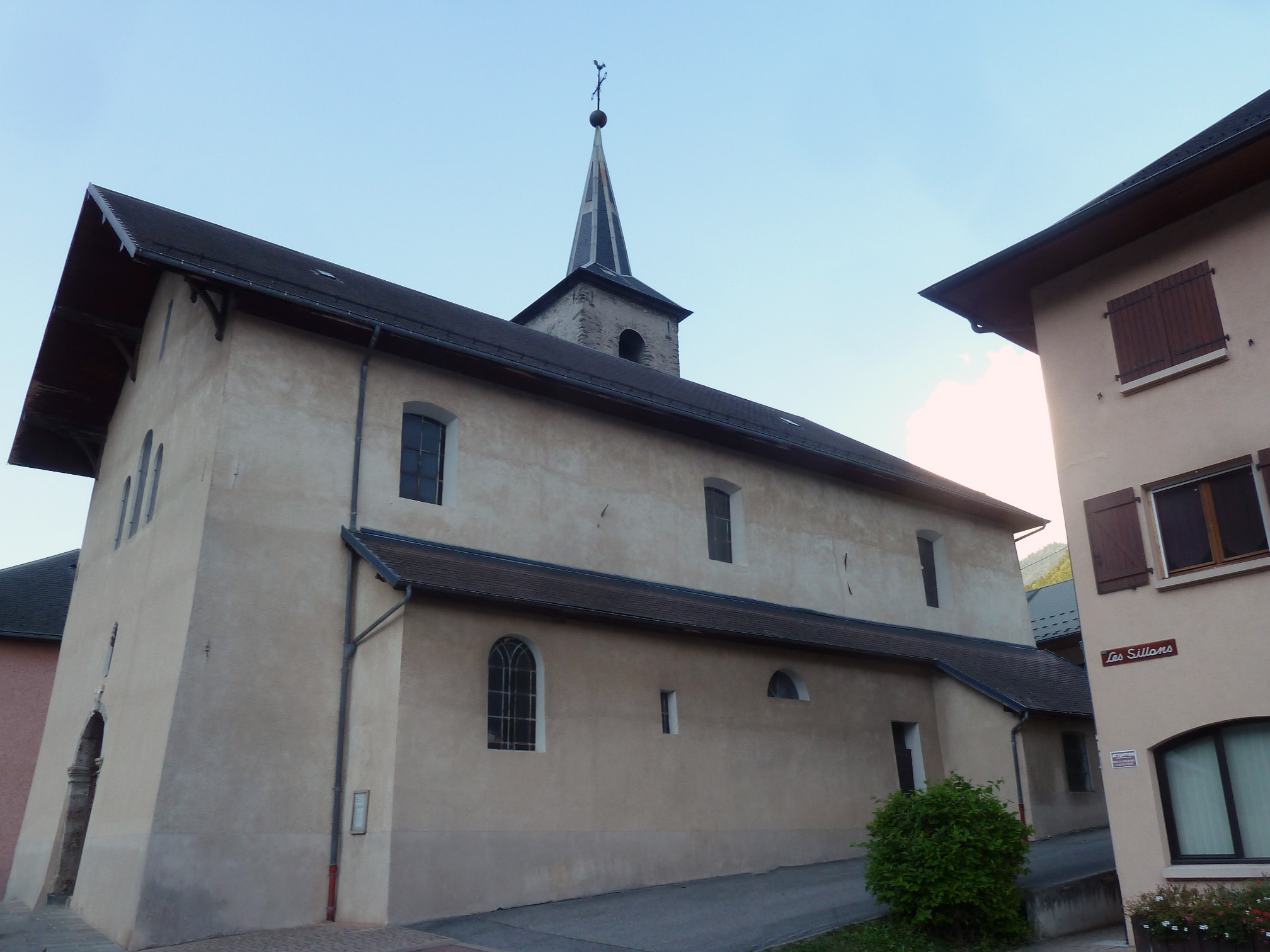
- Location of La Chapelle
- Location within France Location within Auvergne-Rhône-Alpes
- Coordinates: 45°25′11″N 6°16′43″E
- Country: France
- Region: Auvergne-Rhône-Alpes
- Department: Savoie
- Arrondissement: Saint-Jean-de-Maurienne
- Canton: Saint-Jean-de-Maurienne

Government
  - Mayor (2023–2026): Charles Costel
- Area^{1}: 12.28 km^{2} (4.74 sq mi)
- Highest elevation: 2,200 m (7,200 ft)
- Lowest elevation: 360 m (1,180 ft)
- Population (2023): 326
  - Density: 26.5/km^{2} (68.8/sq mi)
- Time zone: UTC+01:00 (CET)
  - Summer (DST): UTC+02:00 (CEST)
- INSEE/Postal code: 73074 /73660
- ^{1} French Land Register data, which excludes lakes, ponds, glaciers > 1 km^{2} (0.386 sq mi or 247 acres) and river estuaries.

La Chapelle (French pronunciation: [la ʃapɛl]; lit. 'The Chapel'; Savoyard: La Shapéla) is a rural commune in the Savoie department in the Auvergne-Rhône-Alpes region in southeastern France.

== Geography ==
=== Climate ===
In 2010, the climate of the commune was a Type 1, according to a study by the French National Centre for Scientific Research based on a series of data covering the period of 1971–2000. In 2020, Météo-France published a typology of the climates of metropolitan France in which the commune is exposed to a mountain climate and is in the northern Alps climatic region, characterized by an annual rainfall of 1,200 to 1,500 mm, irregularly distributed in summer.

From 1971–2000, the mean annual temperature is 10.5 °C, with an annual temperature range of 19.4 °C. The average annual rainfall total is 1,168 mm, with 9.6 days of precipitation in January and 9 days in July. From 1991–2020, the average annual temperature observed at the nearest Météo-France weather station, "Saint-Alban des Hurtières", in the commune of Saint-Alban-d'Hurtières, 7 km away per great-circle navigation, is 11.0 °C and the mean annual precipitation total is 1,274.5 mm. For the future, the municipality's climate parameters estimated for 2050 according to different greenhouse gas emission scenarios can be consulted on a dedicated website published by Météo-France in November 2022.

Topography

La Chapelle is located on one of the largest debris fans in the Western Alps within the Maurienne cluster which extends along the valley of the Arc beneath the Lauzière crest. The fan has an estimated volume of 120 million cubic metres, deposited mainly in a catastrophic event at the end of the ice age, with subsequent overlays; it dammed the temporary lake of St Rémy.

== Urban planning ==
=== Typology ===
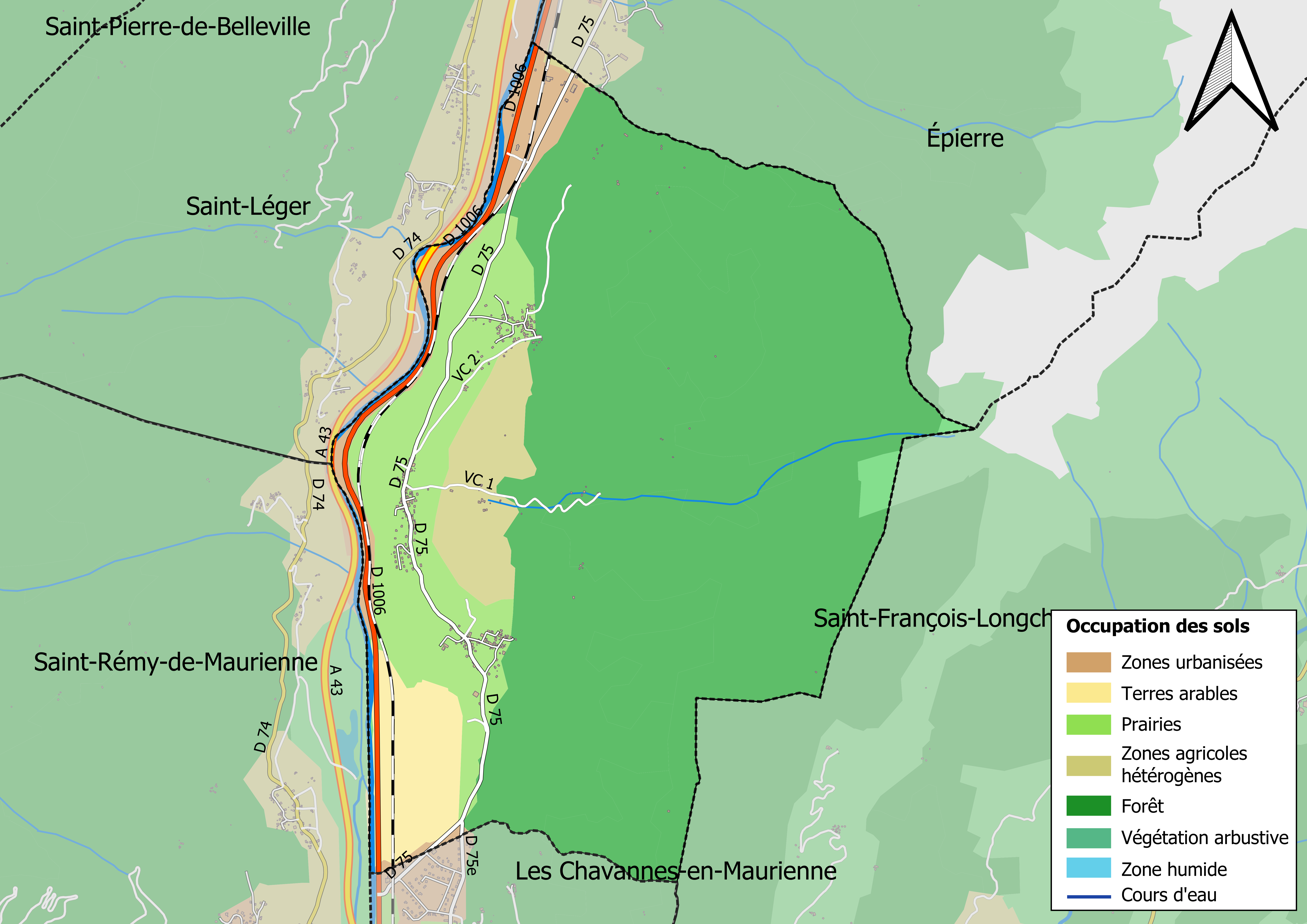
Map of the municipality's infrastructure and land use in 2018 (CLC).

As of 1 January 2024, La Chapelle is categorised as a rural commune with dispersed housing, according to the new seven-level municipal density grid defined by INSEE in 2022. It is located outside the urban unit. In addition, the commune is part of the Saint-Jean-de-Maurienne attraction area, of which it is a crown commune. (Note: In October 2020, the concept of functional areas replaced the old concept of urban areas, to allow consistent comparisons with other countries of the European Union.) This area, which includes 26 municipalities, is categorized as an area with fewer than 50,000 inhabitants.

=== Land use ===
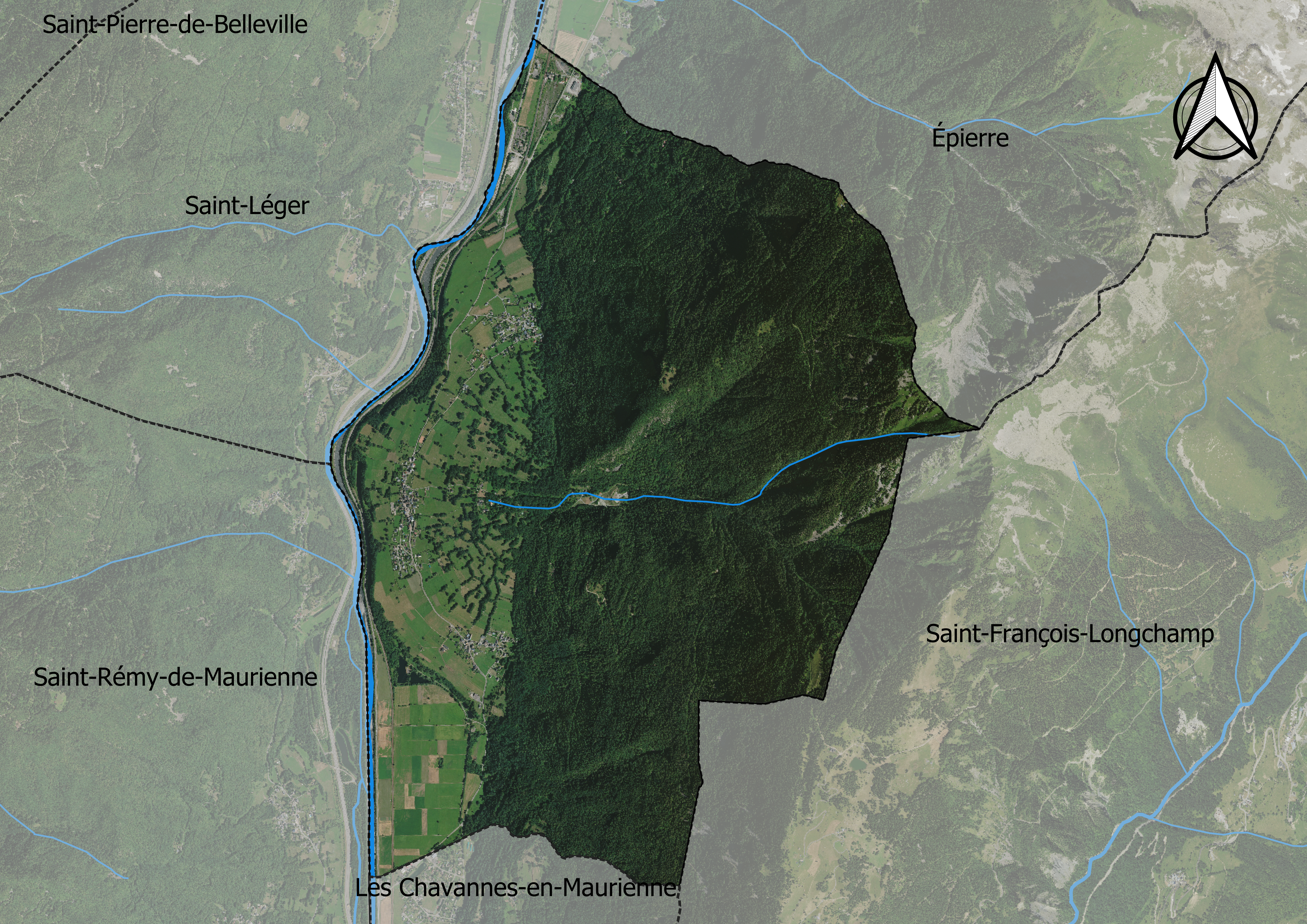
Orthophotogrammetric map of the commune.

The land use of the municipality, as shown by the European biophysical land cover database Corine Land Cover (CLC), is marked by the importance of forests and semi-natural environments (72% in 2018), which is decreasing compared to 1990 (73%). The detailed breakdown in 2018 is as follows: forests (70.9%), meadows (13.7%), heterogeneous agricultural areas (4.9%), arable land (4.7%), industrial or commercial areas and communication networks (4.5%), environments with shrub and/or herbaceous vegetation (1.1%), urbanised areas (0.2%).

The IGN also provides an online tool to compare the evolution over time of the land use of the municipality (or territories at different scales). Several eras are available in the form of maps or aerial photos: the Cassini map (18th century), the staff map (1820-1866) and the current period (1950 to the present day).

== See also ==
- Communes of the Savoie department
