= Murder of Sophie Collombet =

2014 murder in Brisbane, Australia

- Location: Kurilpa Point Park, Brisbane, Queensland, Australia
- Date: 27 March 2014; 12 years ago
- Weapon: Bludgeoning
- Victim: Sophie Collombet
- Perpetrator: Benjamin James Milward

On 27 March 2014, 21-year-old French student Sophie Collombet was raped and bludgeoned to death in Kurilpa Point Park in Brisbane, Queensland, Australia. She had been on her way home from a three-hour lecture at Griffith University where she was studying her Masters of Business. On 7 April Australian citizen Benjamin James Milward from Ipswich, Queensland was arrested and charged with her murder and rape. He was given a life sentence for the murder and rape on 25 October 2016 at the Supreme Court of Queensland in Brisbane. He had been using the illegal drug "ice" at the time of her murder.

== Reports of pedestrians having ignored the naked body and taken no action ==
The case attracted adverse commentary about Australian society as Collombet was believed to be still alive when Milward left her; a number of people had walked past her naked body, which was covered with newspapers and Milward's jacket, but took no action believing her to be a homeless person, many of whom slept in that area. It was a homeless person who eventually checked on Collombet and found no pulse; CPR was attempted without success. Police were also criticised for failing to make the Kurilpa Point Park a safe place despite a number of recent crimes reported there. The park is beside the Brisbane River immediately between the busy William Jolly Bridge and the Gallery of Modern Art at the northern end of the Queensland Cultural Precinct. A popular riverbank walking/cycling track passes through the park.

== Protest march ==
On 10 April 2014, over 2,000 people participated in a march and candlelight vigil in memory of Collombet. The march commenced at King George Square in front of Brisbane City Hall with speeches and then proceeded to the Kurilpa Point Park where the candlelight vigil was held. The organisers of the march said one of the purposes of the march was "to show that Brisbane cares about violence against women”.

== Role of a Catholic Ozcare hostel in the murder ==
There was also criticism of the location (27.4739°S 153.0148°E) of a Catholic Ozcare hostel for homeless men and those recently paroled from prison for offences including murder and rape as being too close to Brisbane's major cultural precinct. Milward had been living at the hostel but had failed to return by the curfew on the night of the murder. He had obtained the drug "ice" which fuelled his attack on Collombet from another resident of the hostel.

== Funeral of Collombet ==
Sophie Collombet was buried in her hometown of Saint-Julien-Mont-Denis a commune in the Savoie department in the Auvergne-Rhône-Alpes region in south-eastern France. Her funeral was a large event where 1200 villagers took part in a grant funeral procession behind her casket with a 120-piece brass band playing Chopin's mournful Marche Funebre (funeral march).
