= Saint-Avre =

Saint-Avre Sant Ovre (Savoyard)
- Commune
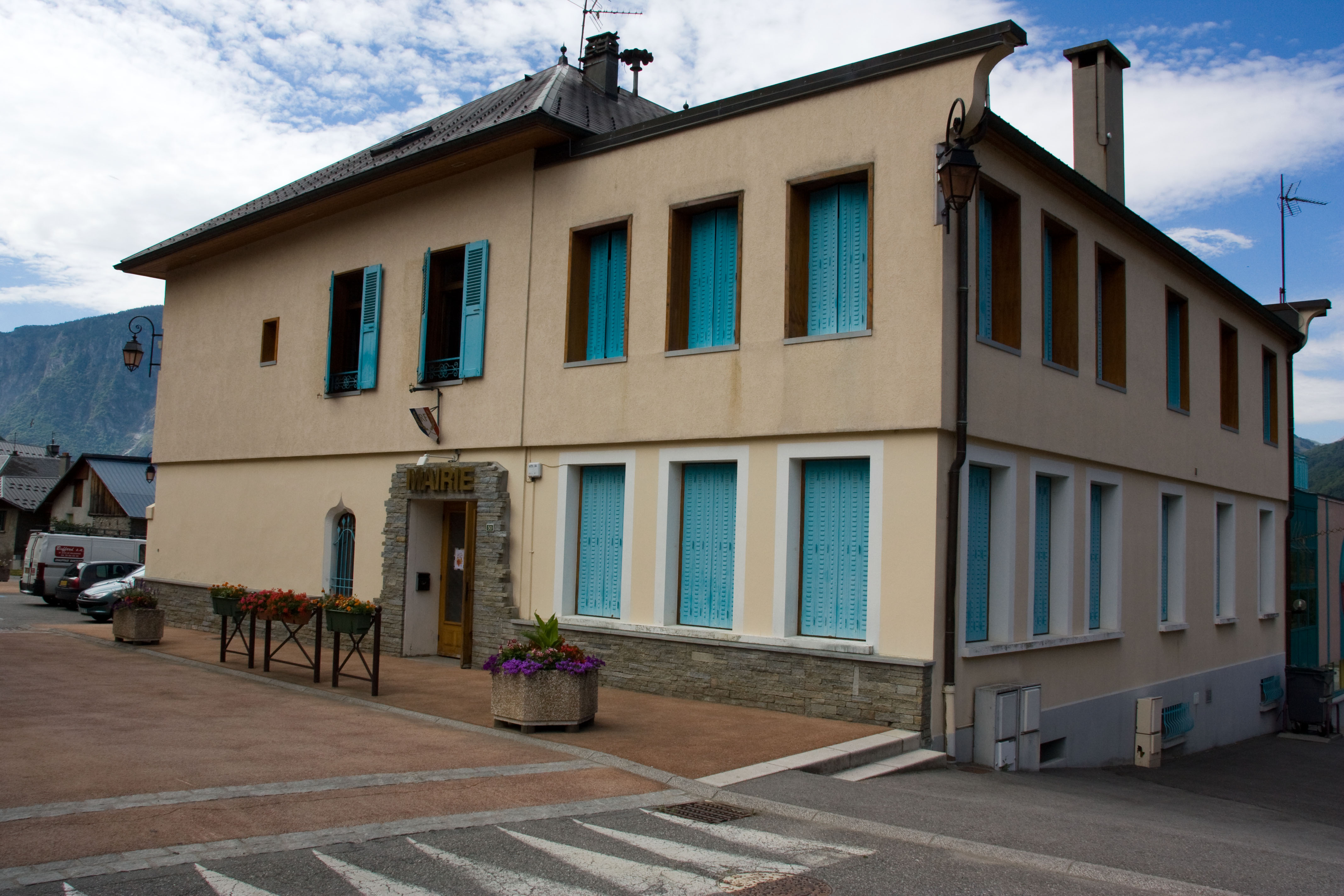
- The town hall in Saint-Avre

- Coat of arms
- Location of Saint-Avre
- Location within France Location within Auvergne-Rhône-Alpes
- Coordinates: 45°21′12″N 6°18′39″E
- Country: France
- Region: Auvergne-Rhône-Alpes
- Department: Savoie
- Arrondissement: Saint-Jean-de-Maurienne
- Canton: Saint-Jean-de-Maurienne

Government
  - Mayor (2020–2026): Simon Pouchoulin
- Area^{1}: 3.64 km^{2} (1.41 sq mi)
- Highest elevation: 1,229 m (4,032 ft)
- Lowest elevation: 443 m (1,453 ft)
- Population (2023): 925
  - Density: 254/km^{2} (658/sq mi)
- Time zone: UTC+01:00 (CET)
  - Summer (DST): UTC+02:00 (CEST)
- INSEE/Postal code: 73224 /73130
- ^{1} French Land Register data, which excludes lakes, ponds, glaciers > 1 km^{2} (0.386 sq mi or 247 acres) and river estuaries.

Saint-Avre (French pronunciation: [sɛ̃.t‿avʁ]; Savoyard: Sant Ovre) is a commune in the Savoie department in the Auvergne-Rhône-Alpes region in south-eastern France.

== See also ==
- Communes of the Savoie department
- Saint-Avre-La Chambre station
