= Saint-Pancrace, Savoie =

Saint-Pancrace Sin Pé (Savoyard)
- Commune
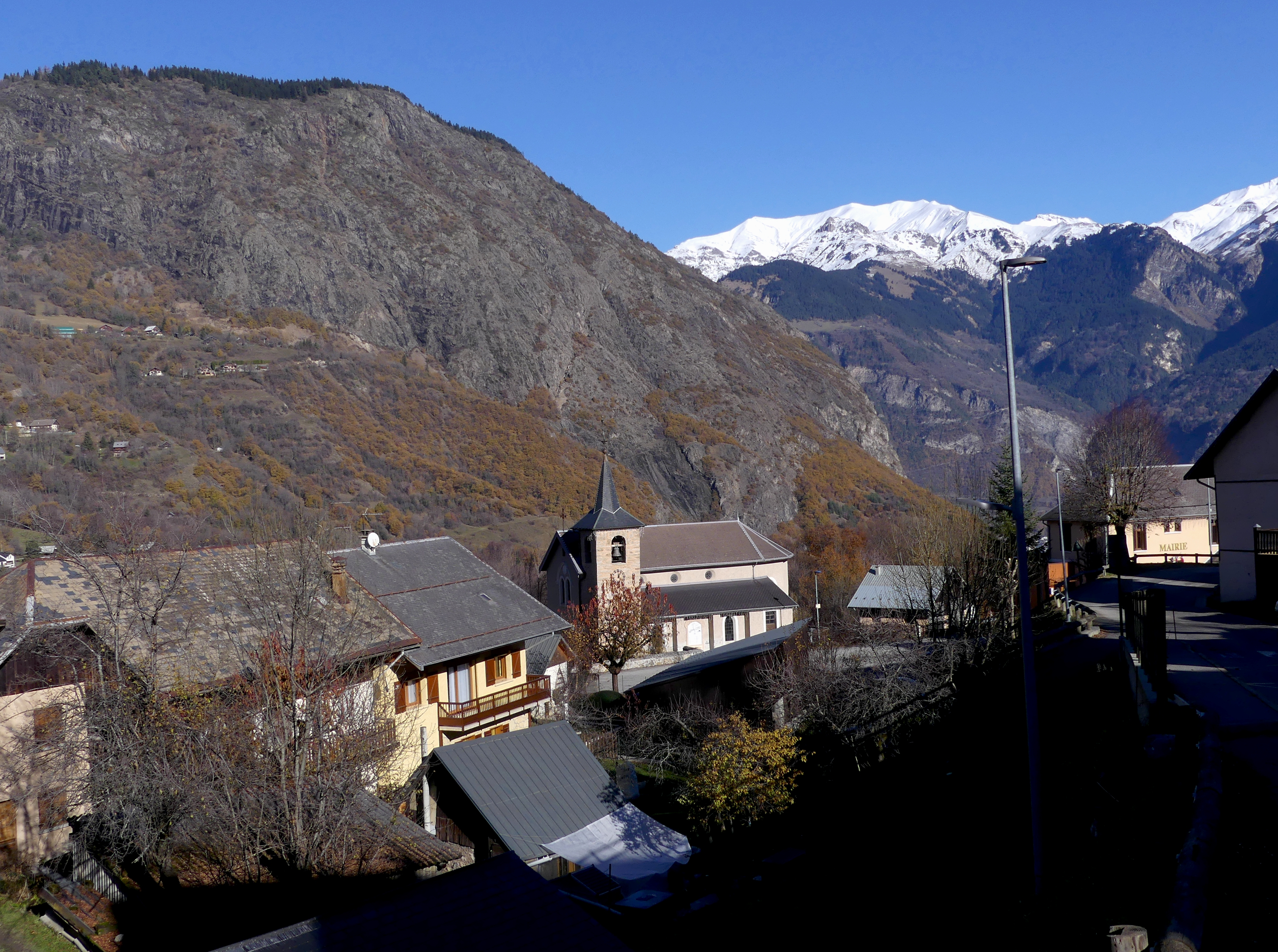
- Location of Saint-Pancrace
- Location within France Location within Auvergne-Rhône-Alpes
- Coordinates: 45°16′14″N 6°19′35″E
- Country: France
- Region: Auvergne-Rhône-Alpes
- Department: Savoie
- Arrondissement: Saint-Jean-de-Maurienne
- Canton: Saint-Jean-de-Maurienne

Government
  - Mayor (2020–2026): Roger Blanc-Coquand
- Area^{1}: 5.59 km^{2} (2.16 sq mi)
- Highest elevation: 2,137 m (7,011 ft)
- Lowest elevation: 715 m (2,346 ft)
- Population (2023): 307
  - Density: 54.9/km^{2} (142/sq mi)
- Time zone: UTC+01:00 (CET)
  - Summer (DST): UTC+02:00 (CEST)
- INSEE/Postal code: 73267 /73300
- ^{1} French Land Register data, which excludes lakes, ponds, glaciers > 1 km^{2} (0.386 sq mi or 247 acres) and river estuaries.

Saint-Pancrace (French pronunciation: [sɛ̃ pɑ̃kʁas]; Savoyard: Sin Pé) is a commune in the Savoie department in the Auvergne-Rhône-Alpes region in south-eastern France.

== See also ==
- Communes of the Savoie department
