= Villarembert =

Villarembert La Rinbèrte (Savoyard)
- Commune
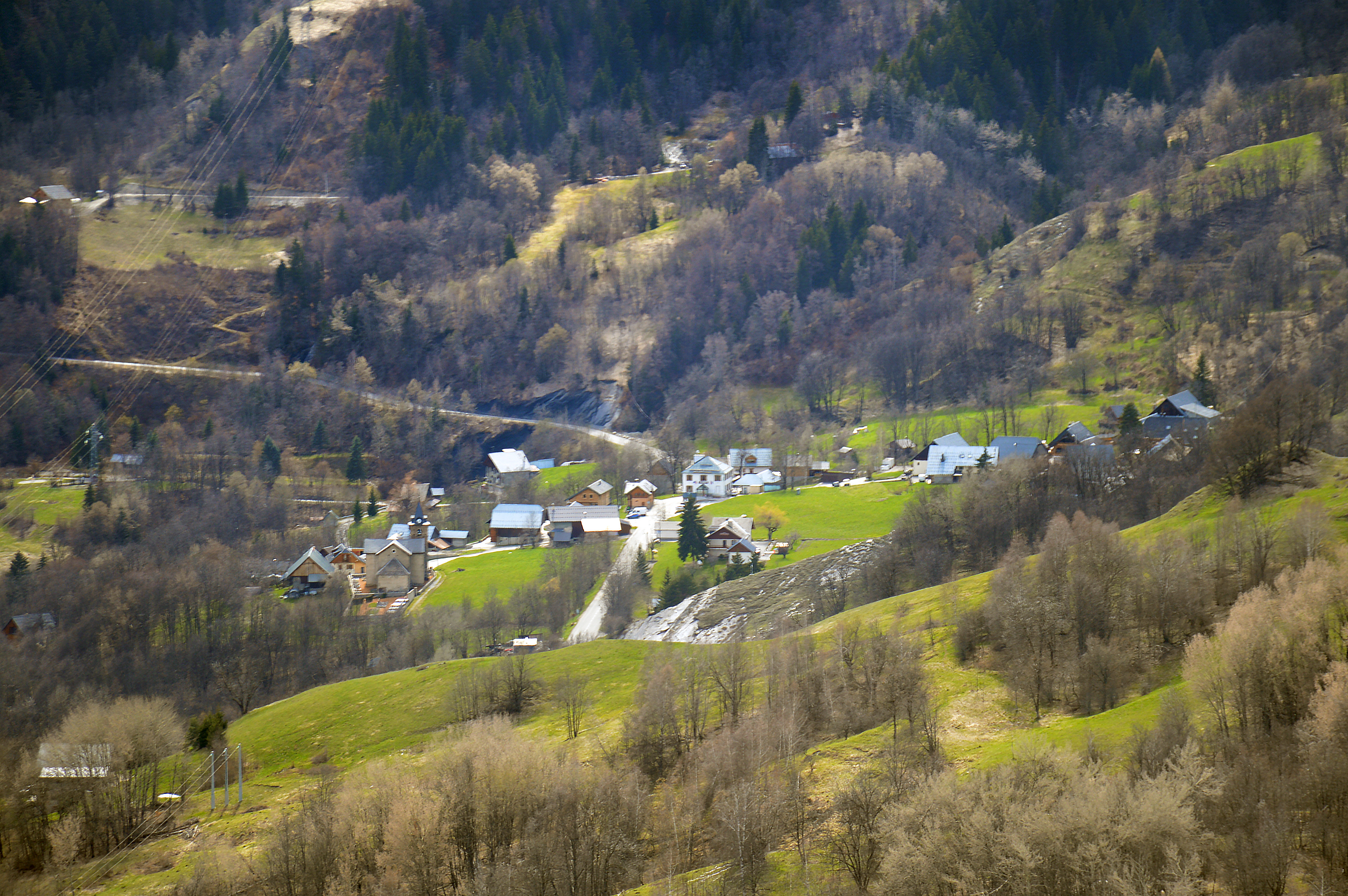
- Villarembert
- Location of Villarembert
- Location within France Location within Auvergne-Rhône-Alpes
- Coordinates: 45°14′47″N 6°16′47″E
- Country: France
- Region: Auvergne-Rhône-Alpes
- Department: Savoie
- Arrondissement: Saint-Jean-de-Maurienne
- Canton: Saint-Jean-de-Maurienne

Government
  - Mayor (2020–2026): Patrice Fontaine
- Area^{1}: 9.58 km^{2} (3.70 sq mi)
- Highest elevation: 2,265 m (7,431 ft)
- Lowest elevation: 1,089 m (3,573 ft)
- Population (2023): 253
  - Density: 26.4/km^{2} (68.4/sq mi)
- Time zone: UTC+01:00 (CET)
  - Summer (DST): UTC+02:00 (CEST)
- INSEE/Postal code: 73318 /73300
- ^{1} French Land Register data, which excludes lakes, ponds, glaciers > 1 km^{2} (0.386 sq mi or 247 acres) and river estuaries.

Villarembert (Savoyard: La Rinbèrte) is a commune in the Savoie department in the Auvergne-Rhône-Alpes region in south-eastern France.

== See also ==
- Communes of the Savoie department
