= Saint-Étienne-de-Cuines =

- Commune
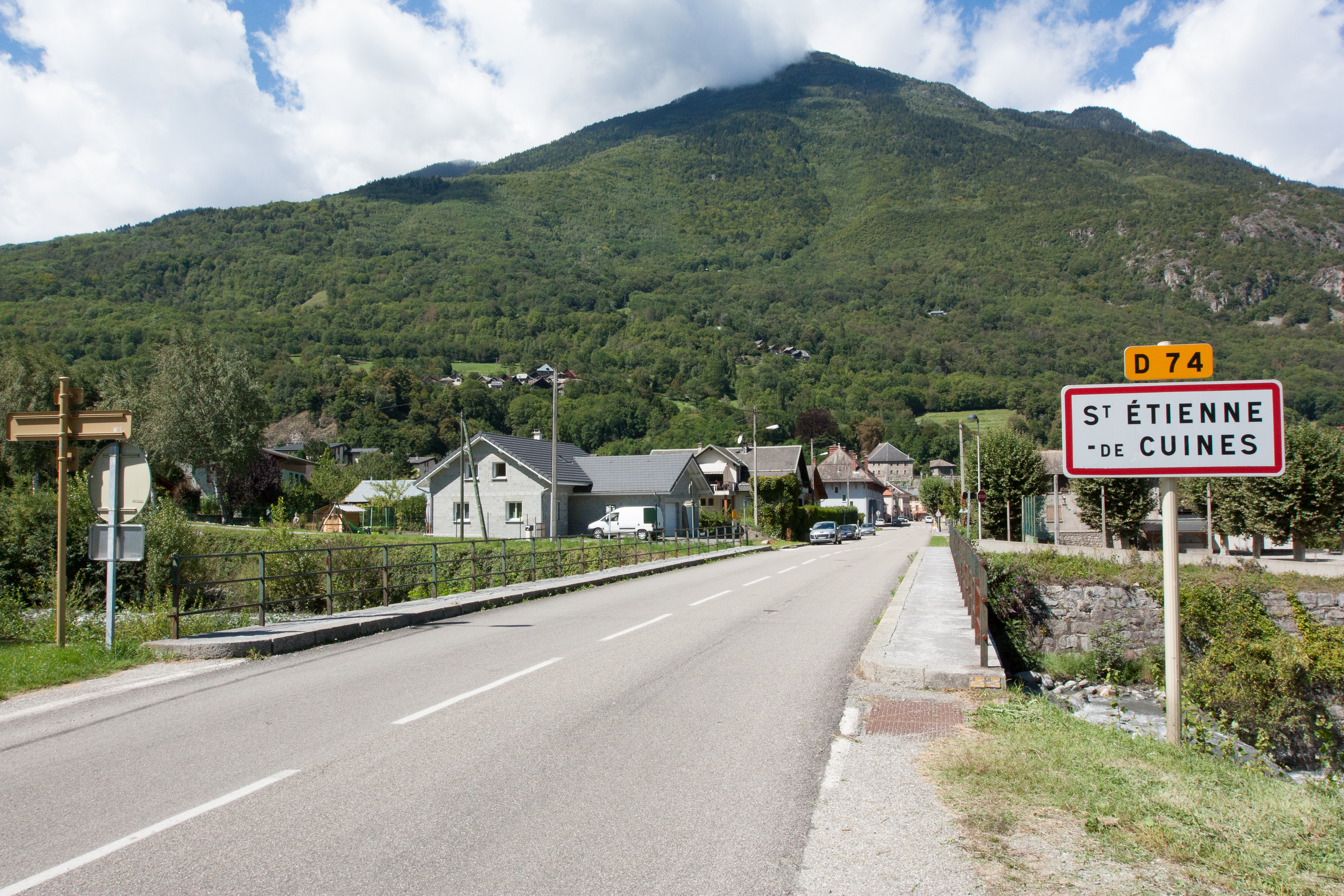
- The road into Saint-Etienne-de-Cuines
- Location of Saint-Étienne-de-Cuines
- Location within France Location within Auvergne-Rhône-Alpes
- Coordinates: 45°20′35″N 6°17′33″E
- Country: France
- Region: Auvergne-Rhône-Alpes
- Department: Savoie
- Arrondissement: Saint-Jean-de-Maurienne
- Canton: Saint-Jean-de-Maurienne

Government
  - Mayor (2020–2026): Dominique Lazzaro
- Area^{1}: 20.5 km^{2} (7.9 sq mi)
- Highest elevation: 2,760 m (9,060 ft)
- Lowest elevation: 425 m (1,394 ft)
- Population (2023): 1,186
  - Density: 57.9/km^{2} (150/sq mi)
- Time zone: UTC+01:00 (CET)
  - Summer (DST): UTC+02:00 (CEST)
- INSEE/Postal code: 73231 /73130
- ^{1} French Land Register data, which excludes lakes, ponds, glaciers > 1 km^{2} (0.386 sq mi or 247 acres) and river estuaries.

Saint-Étienne-de-Cuines (Arpitan: Sent-Tièno-de-Cuéna) is a commune in the Savoie department in the Auvergne-Rhône-Alpes region in south-eastern France.

== See also ==
- Communes of the Savoie department
