= Saint-Julien-Mont-Denis =

Saint-Julien-Mont-Denis Sin Dlin (Savoyard)
- Commune
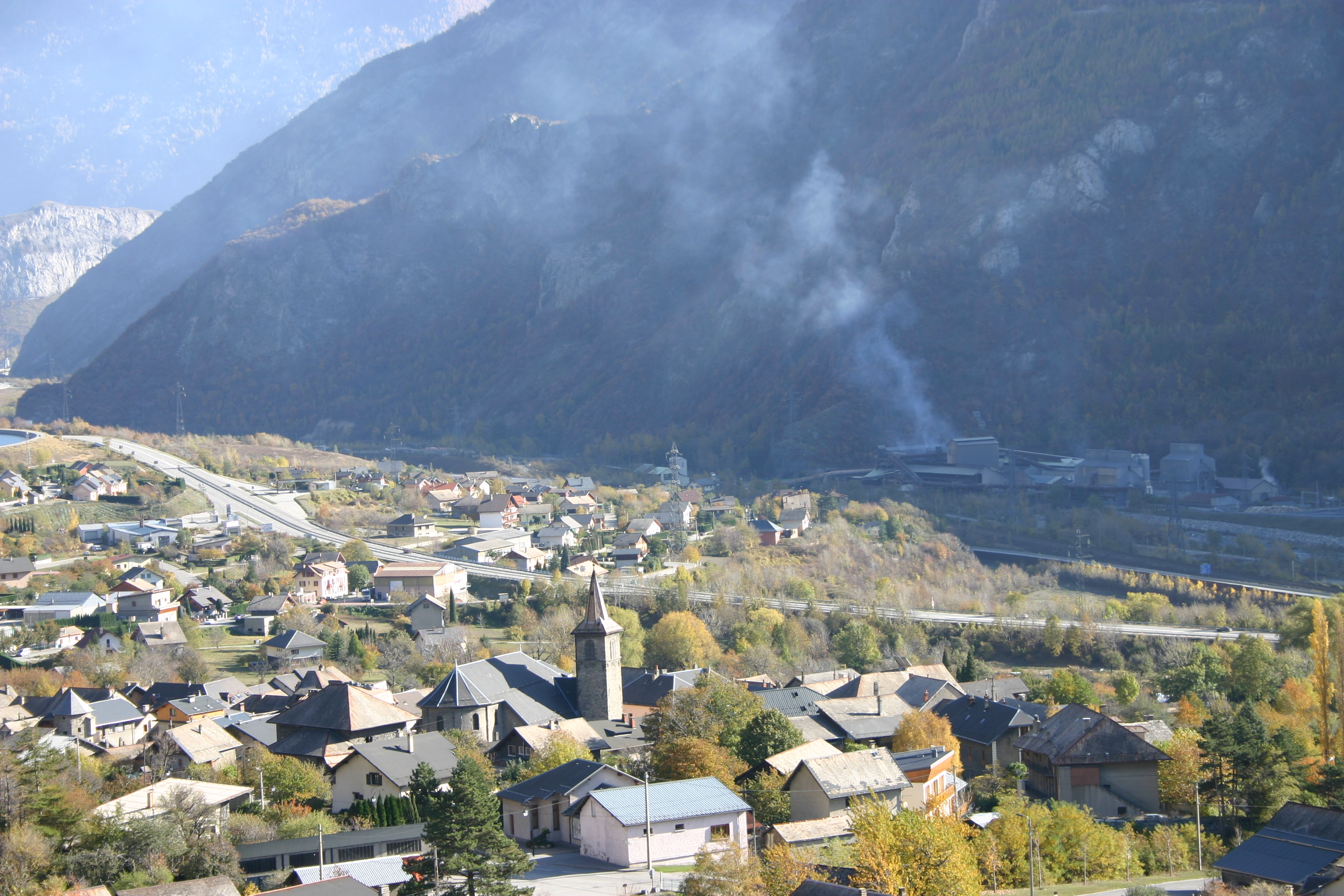
- A general view of Saint-Julien-Mont-Denis
- Location of Saint-Julien-Mont-Denis
- Location within France Location within Auvergne-Rhône-Alpes
- Coordinates: 45°15′26″N 6°24′19″E
- Country: France
- Region: Auvergne-Rhône-Alpes
- Department: Savoie
- Arrondissement: Saint-Jean-de-Maurienne
- Canton: Saint-Jean-de-Maurienne
- Intercommunality: Cœur de Maurienne Arvan

Government
  - Mayor (2020–2026): François Rovasio
- Area^{1}: 33.04 km^{2} (12.76 sq mi)
- Highest elevation: 2,824 m (9,265 ft)
- Lowest elevation: 552 m (1,811 ft)
- Population (2023): 1,506
  - Density: 45.58/km^{2} (118.1/sq mi)
- Time zone: UTC+01:00 (CET)
  - Summer (DST): UTC+02:00 (CEST)
- INSEE/Postal code: 73250 /73870
- Website: www.saint-julien-montdenis.com
- ^{1} French Land Register data, which excludes lakes, ponds, glaciers > 1 km^{2} (0.386 sq mi or 247 acres) and river estuaries.

Saint-Julien-Mont-Denis (Savoyard: Sin Dlin) is a commune, in Maurienne Valley, in Savoie department in the Auvergne-Rhône-Alpes region in south-eastern France.

== See also ==
- Communes of the Savoie department
