= Montvernier =

- Commune
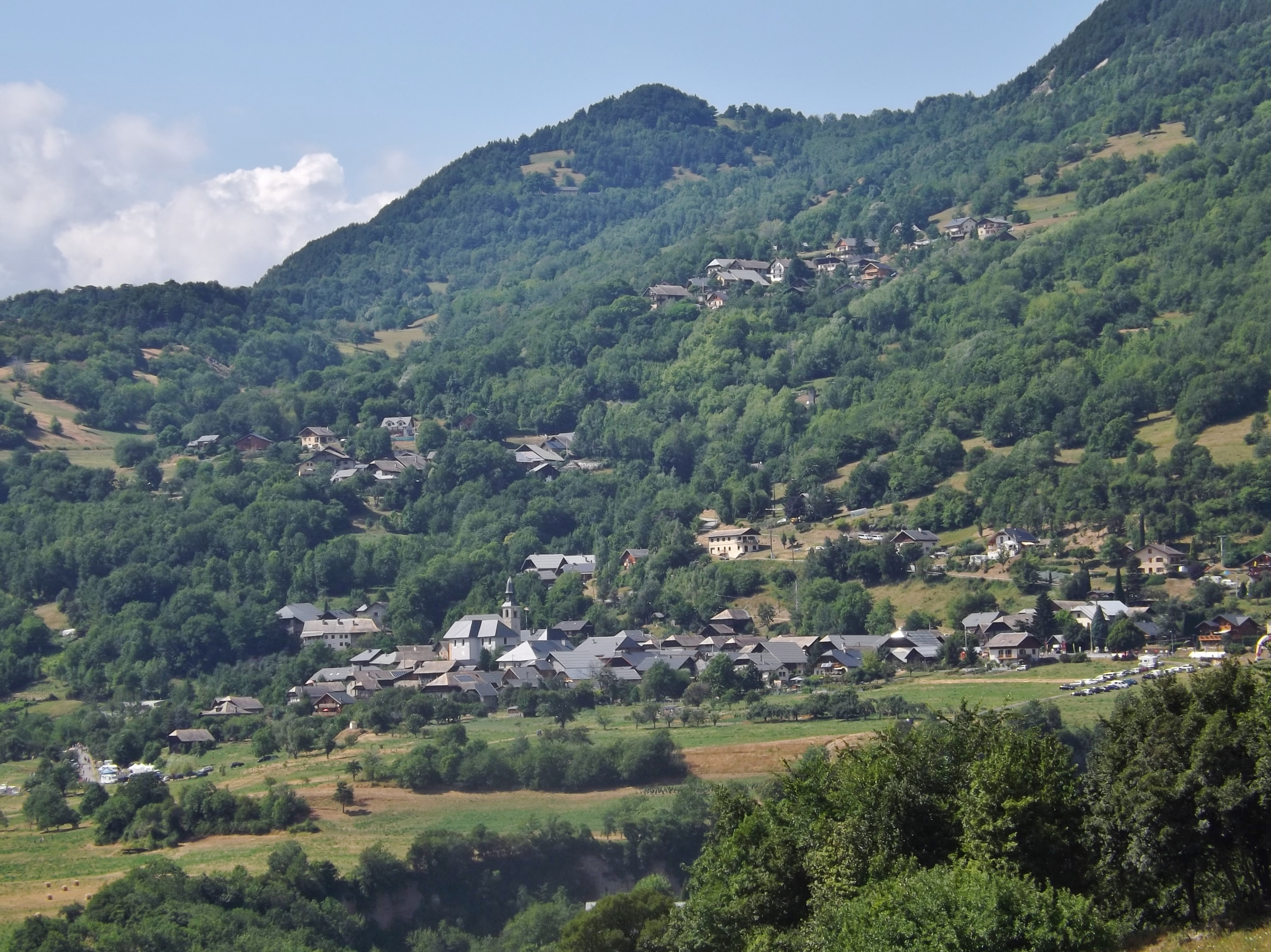
- A general view of Montvernier, from Le Châtel
- Location of Montvernier
- Location within France Location within Auvergne-Rhône-Alpes
- Coordinates: 45°19′20″N 6°20′38″E
- Country: France
- Region: Auvergne-Rhône-Alpes
- Department: Savoie
- Arrondissement: Saint-Jean-de-Maurienne
- Canton: Saint-Jean-de-Maurienne

Government
  - Mayor (2020–2026): Daniel Crosaz
- Area^{1}: 6.68 km^{2} (2.58 sq mi)
- Highest elevation: 1,726 m (5,663 ft)
- Lowest elevation: 560 m (1,840 ft)
- Population (2023): 240
  - Density: 36/km^{2} (93/sq mi)
- Time zone: UTC+01:00 (CET)
  - Summer (DST): UTC+02:00 (CEST)
- INSEE/Postal code: 73177 /73300
- Website: www.montvernier.fr
- ^{1} French Land Register data, which excludes lakes, ponds, glaciers > 1 km^{2} (0.386 sq mi or 247 acres) and river estuaries.

Montvernier (French pronunciation: [mɔ̃vɛʁnje]; Arpitan: Montgouarniér) is a commune in the Savoie department in the Auvergne-Rhône-Alpes region in south-eastern France.

== See also ==
- Communes of the Savoie department
