= Sainte-Marie-de-Cuines =

- Commune
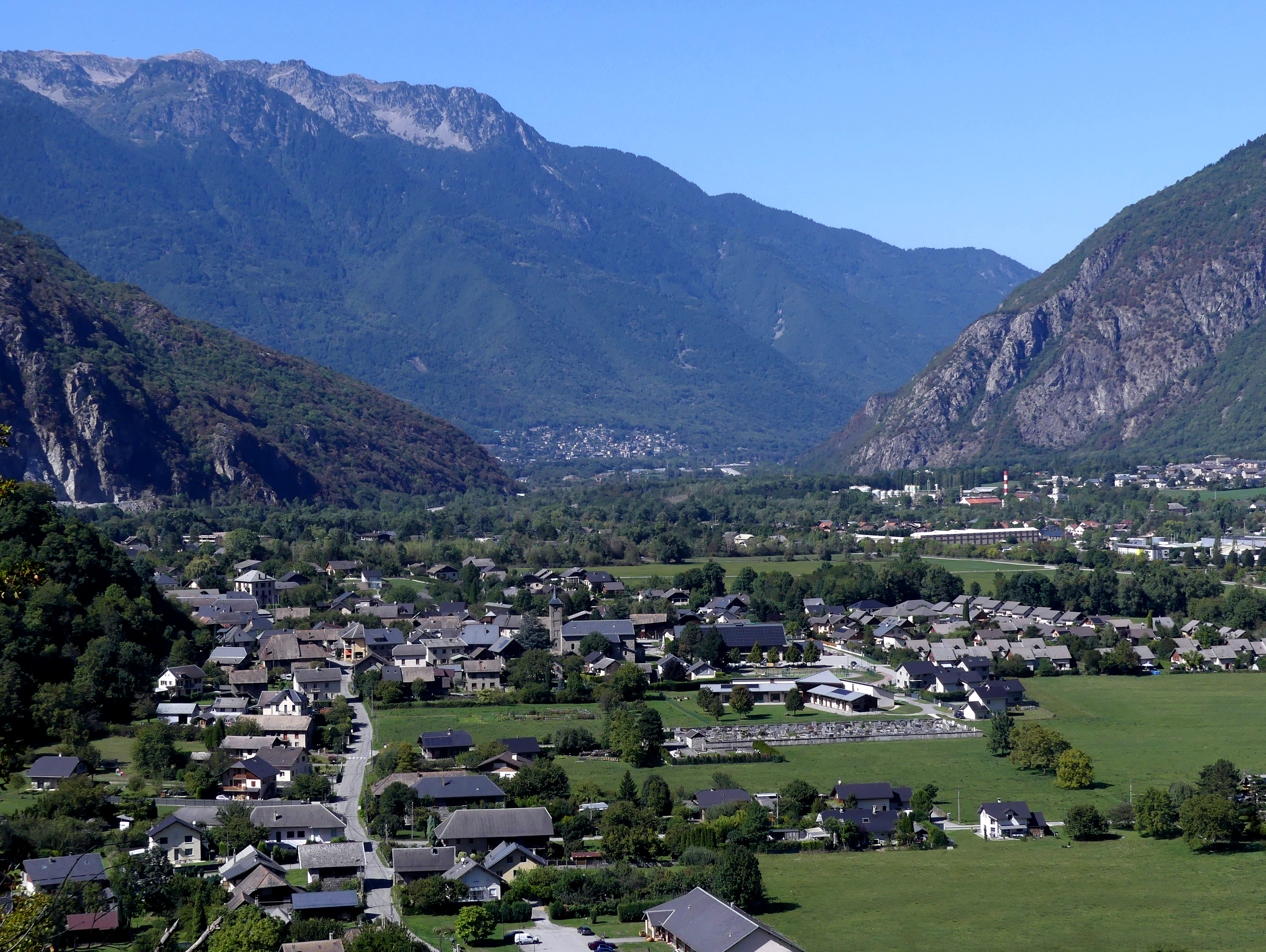
- Location of Sainte-Marie-de-Cuines
- Location within France Location within Auvergne-Rhône-Alpes
- Coordinates: 45°20′27″N 6°18′07″E
- Country: France
- Region: Auvergne-Rhône-Alpes
- Department: Savoie
- Arrondissement: Saint-Jean-de-Maurienne
- Canton: Saint-Jean-de-Maurienne

Government
  - Mayor (2020–2026): Philippe Girard
- Area^{1}: 14.95 km^{2} (5.77 sq mi)
- Highest elevation: 2,136 m (7,008 ft)
- Lowest elevation: 447 m (1,467 ft)
- Population (2023): 847
  - Density: 56.7/km^{2} (147/sq mi)
- Time zone: UTC+01:00 (CET)
  - Summer (DST): UTC+02:00 (CEST)
- INSEE/Postal code: 73255 /73130
- ^{1} French Land Register data, which excludes lakes, ponds, glaciers > 1 km^{2} (0.386 sq mi or 247 acres) and river estuaries.

Sainte-Marie-de-Cuines (French pronunciation: [sɛ̃t maʁi də kɥin]; Arpitan: Senta-Maria-de-Cuéna) is a commune in the Savoie department in the Auvergne-Rhône-Alpes region in south-eastern France.

== Geography ==
=== Climate ===
Sainte-Marie-de-Cuines has an oceanic climate (Köppen climate classification Cfb) closely bordering on a humid subtropical climate (Cfa). The average annual temperature in Sainte-Marie-de-Cuines is 11.9 °C (53.4 °F). The average annual rainfall is 856.4 mm (33.72 in) with December as the wettest month. The temperatures are highest on average in July, at around 21.5 °C (70.7 °F), and lowest in January, at around 2.1 °C (35.8 °F). The highest temperature ever recorded in Sainte-Marie-de-Cuines was 39.2 °C (102.6 °F) on 12 August 2003; the coldest temperature ever recorded was −15.0 °C (5.0 °F) on 5 February 2012.

Climate data for Sainte-Marie-de-Cuines (1991−2020 normals, extremes 1997−present)
Month	Jan	Feb	Mar	Apr	May	Jun	Jul	Aug	Sep	Oct	Nov	Dec	Year
Record high °C (°F)	20.3 (68.5)	21.8 (71.2)	26.8 (80.2)	30.9 (87.6)	32.9 (91.2)	36.9 (98.4)	38.9 (102.0)	39.2 (102.6)	32.3 (90.1)	29.2 (84.6)	24.2 (75.6)	19.8 (67.6)	39.2 (102.6)
Mean daily maximum °C (°F)	6.4 (43.5)	8.8 (47.8)	14.1 (57.4)	18.4 (65.1)	21.9 (71.4)	26.2 (79.2)	28.4 (83.1)	27.4 (81.3)	23.1 (73.6)	17.8 (64.0)	11.1 (52.0)	6.6 (43.9)	17.5 (63.5)
Daily mean °C (°F)	2.1 (35.8)	3.8 (38.8)	8.2 (46.8)	12.1 (53.8)	15.7 (60.3)	19.6 (67.3)	21.5 (70.7)	20.9 (69.6)	17.0 (62.6)	12.4 (54.3)	6.5 (43.7)	2.5 (36.5)	11.9 (53.4)
Mean daily minimum °C (°F)	−2.2 (28.0)	−1.3 (29.7)	2.2 (36.0)	5.9 (42.6)	9.5 (49.1)	13.0 (55.4)	14.6 (58.3)	14.4 (57.9)	10.9 (51.6)	6.9 (44.4)	1.9 (35.4)	−1.5 (29.3)	6.2 (43.2)
Record low °C (°F)	−12.9 (8.8)	−15.0 (5.0)	−12.3 (9.9)	−4.0 (24.8)	−1.4 (29.5)	1.8 (35.2)	6.5 (43.7)	4.9 (40.8)	1.1 (34.0)	−4.5 (23.9)	−9.7 (14.5)	−13.2 (8.2)	−15.0 (5.0)
Average precipitation mm (inches)	90.1 (3.55)	63.0 (2.48)	73.5 (2.89)	54.6 (2.15)	71.1 (2.80)	61.2 (2.41)	67.8 (2.67)	80.4 (3.17)	57.8 (2.28)	71.1 (2.80)	74.9 (2.95)	90.9 (3.58)	856.4 (33.72)
Average precipitation days (≥ 1.0 mm)	8.4	7.0	8.4	8.1	10.6	8.7	8.5	8.8	7.0	8.4	8.7	8.5	101.0
Source: Météo-France

== See also ==
- Communes of the Savoie department
