= Saint-Alban-des-Villards =

- Commune
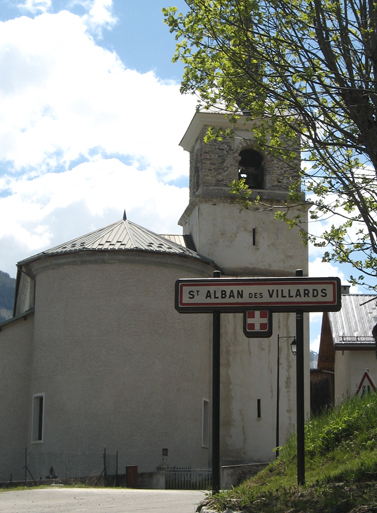
- The church in Saint-Alban-des-Villards
- Location of Saint-Alban-des-Villards
- Location within France Location within Auvergne-Rhône-Alpes
- Coordinates: 45°19′N 6°15′E
- Country: France
- Region: Auvergne-Rhône-Alpes
- Department: Savoie
- Arrondissement: Saint-Jean-de-Maurienne
- Canton: Saint-Jean-de-Maurienne

Government
  - Mayor (2020–2026): Jacqueline Dupenloup
- Area^{1}: 24.02 km^{2} (9.27 sq mi)
- Highest elevation: 2,727 m (8,947 ft)
- Lowest elevation: 667 m (2,188 ft)
- Population (2023): 92
  - Density: 3.8/km^{2} (9.9/sq mi)
- Time zone: UTC+01:00 (CET)
  - Summer (DST): UTC+02:00 (CEST)
- INSEE/Postal code: 73221 /73130
- ^{1} French Land Register data, which excludes lakes, ponds, glaciers > 1 km^{2} (0.386 sq mi or 247 acres) and river estuaries.

Saint-Alban-des-Villards (French pronunciation: [sɛ̃.t‿albɑ̃ de vilaʁ]; Arpitan: Sent-Alban-dus-Velârs) is a commune in the Savoie department in the Auvergne-Rhône-Alpes region in south-eastern France.

== See also ==
- Communes of the Savoie department
