= Aprus of Sens =

Saint Aprus (Aper, Apre, Epvre, Evre, Avre) was a 7th-century French priest and hermit. He is the namesake of Saint-Avre. A native of Sens, he was a hermit near La Chambre and Saint-Jean-de-Maurienne. He founded a refuge for pilgrims and the poor in the village named after him.

His feast day is December 5.
