= Aper (grammarian) =

Aper was a Greek grammarian, who lived in ancient Rome in the time of the emperor Tiberius. He belonged to the school of Aristarchus of Samothrace. He was a strenuous opponent of the grammarian Didymus Chalcenterus, and he wrote numerous polemical works attacking this author. One of the students of Didymus, Heraclides Ponticus the Younger, wrote works in defense of his master, and attacking Aper.

Some scholars have hypothesized that the reading of "Aper" is incorrect here, especially seeing as our information on him is so scant, and it is likely another grammarian is meant, perhaps Apion.
