= Canton of Saint-Jean-de-Maurienne =

Coordinates: 45.28°N 6.34°E

The canton of Saint-Jean-de-Maurienne is an administrative division of the Savoie department, southeastern France. Its borders were modified at the French canton reorganisation which came into effect in March 2015. Its seat is in Saint-Jean-de-Maurienne.

It consists of the following communes:

1. Albiez-le-Jeune
2. Albiez-Montrond
3. La Chambre
4. La Chapelle
5. Les Chavannes-en-Maurienne
6. Fontcouverte-la-Toussuire
7. Jarrier
8. Montricher-Albanne
9. Montvernier
10. Notre-Dame-du-Cruet
11. Saint-Alban-des-Villards
12. Saint-Avre
13. Saint-Colomban-des-Villards
14. Sainte-Marie-de-Cuines
15. Saint-Étienne-de-Cuines
16. Saint-François-Longchamp
17. Saint-Jean-d'Arves
18. Saint-Jean-de-Maurienne
19. Saint-Julien-Mont-Denis
20. Saint-Martin-sur-la-Chambre
21. Saint-Pancrace
22. Saint-Rémy-de-Maurienne
23. Saint-Sorlin-d'Arves
24. La Tour-en-Maurienne
25. Villarembert
26. Villargondran
