= La Chambre =

La Chambre La Shanbra (Savoyard)
- Commune
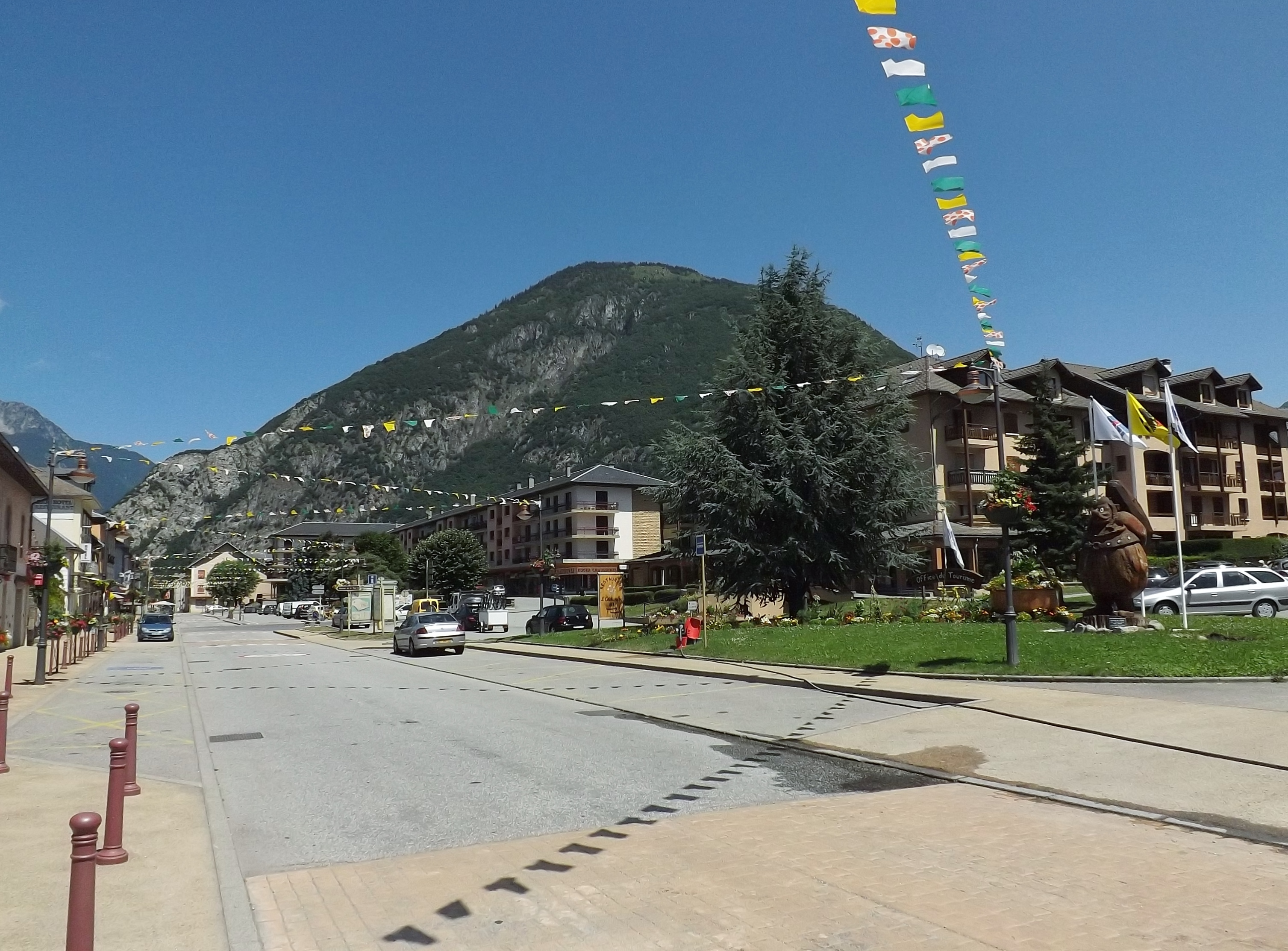
- The road in the centre of La Chambre

- Coat of arms
- Location of La Chambre
- Location within France Location within Auvergne-Rhône-Alpes
- Coordinates: 45°21′37″N 6°18′03″E
- Country: France
- Region: Auvergne-Rhône-Alpes
- Department: Savoie
- Arrondissement: Saint-Jean-de-Maurienne
- Canton: Saint-Jean-de-Maurienne

Government
  - Mayor (2020–2026): Mathilde Sonzogni
- Area^{1}: 3.2 km^{2} (1.2 sq mi)
- Highest elevation: 760 m (2,490 ft)
- Lowest elevation: 419 m (1,375 ft)
- Population (2023): 1,221
  - Density: 380/km^{2} (990/sq mi)
- Time zone: UTC+01:00 (CET)
  - Summer (DST): UTC+02:00 (CEST)
- INSEE/Postal code: 73067 /73130
- Website: www.la-chambre.fr
- ^{1} French Land Register data, which excludes lakes, ponds, glaciers > 1 km^{2} (0.386 sq mi or 247 acres) and river estuaries.

La Chambre (French pronunciation: [la ʃɑ̃bʁ]; Savoyard: La Shanbra) is a commune in the Savoie department in the Auvergne-Rhône-Alpes region in south-eastern France.

== See also ==
- Communes of the Savoie department
