= Savoyard dialect =

Franco-Provençal dialect of Savoy, France

Savoyard
- savoyârd
- Native to: France
- Region: Savoy
- Native speakers: (35,000 cited 1989)
- Language family: Indo-European: Italic; Latino-Faliscan; Latin; Romance; Italo-Western; Western Romance; Gallo-Iberian?; Gallo-Romance; Gallo-Rhaetian?; Arpitan–Oïl; Franco-Provençal; Savoyard
- Writing system: Latin

Official status
- Recognised minority language in: Italy (Franco-Provençal protected by statute)
- Regulated by: Institut de la langue savoyarde

Language codes
- ISO 639-3: –
- Glottolog: savo1253
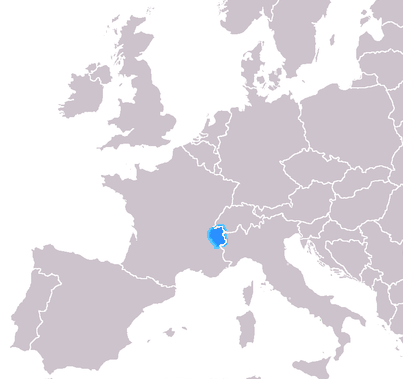

Savoyard (endonym: savoyârd) is a Gallo-Romance dialect grouped into Franco-Provençal. It is spoken in some territories of the historical Duchy of Savoy, nowadays a geographic area spanning the departments of Savoie and Haute-Savoie, France, and the Canton of Geneva, Switzerland. It has around 35,000 speakers today.

The Savoyard language is included in the European Charter for Regional or Minority Languages as a dialect of the Franco-Provencal. However, Savoyard is itself subdivided into many sub-dialects in almost all major valleys.

Savoyard has seen its number of speakers greatly decrease since the annexation of Savoy to France in 1860, in particular because of the prohibition of speaking it at school, military service, as well as during the two world conflicts. The 20th century saw the number of speakers decrease from almost all of the population of the Savoyard countryside to a few tens of thousands.

However, during the 1980s, a renewed interest existed with the organization of many international festivals of the Franco-Provencal language, the creation of several associations with the aim of safeguarding this language, in particular, the group of Conflans, and the "Institut de la langue savoyarde", the publication of many books (monographs, books, novels), as well as the teaching – although difficult, because of the lack of recognition as a regional language. Many exchanges between students who have taken this option are organized each year, especially during the Constantin-Désormeaux competition to reward the best work of students in this language. Bilingual signage is also beginning to be present in Savoy at the entrance of the agglomerations.

The way in which Savoyard must evolve, as for a possible pseudo-uniformization, a spelling common to the whole of the Franco-Provencal area, is however subject to many controversies between several currents. These currents are most often divided into two groups. Patoisants, a group mainly formed of retirees, who, for the most part, are native speakers, having unconsciously learned the language from an early age with their parents, often with regard to rural life, but who, for some of them, have only "re interested themselves" in the Savoyard at a late age: for the majority, they are for a preservation of the language, and its variations, prefer to use the graphie de Conflans (a type of semi-phonetic spelling). The other group, informal, is composed of the new speakers, whose most represented group is that of the arpitans. Most of these are intellectuals and have learned the language only late, voluntarily. Unlike the patoisants, they use the term patois only with native speakers, because they believe that for the general public, the term patois has a derogatory connotation, and only moderately use the word Franco-Provencal which is of a confused nature, they prefer the Arpitan neologism.

== History ==
Savoyard is a dialect of Franco-Provençal, itself a Gallo-Romance language that developed mainly from Latin and the Gaulish dialects, with a Burgundian substrate whose importance remains debated. Emerging during the Carolingian period, together with the wider Franco-Provençal linguistic area, Savoyard underwent a series of developments and divisions that shaped the modern dialect and its different valley-based varieties.

=== Origins and early medieval development ===
The earliest development of Savoyard is associated with the Carolingian period, during the differentiation of the Oïl and Franco-Provençal linguistic areas. One explanation connects this separation with the political reorganization of northern Gaul after the reign of Clovis I, when Paris became the center of the Salian Frankish kingdom. As a result, linguistic developments characteristic of the Oil area were not always adopted in the Franco-Provençal area.

A major difference was the resistance of the Franco-Provençal area to the generalized final-stress pattern, or oxytonism, found in the Oil languages. Many final vowels, especially final -a marking the feminine, remained weakly pronounced or unstressed. Thus Latin rosa developed into French rose, while Savoyard preserved forms such as reu or rouza.

On the main substrate of Savoyard, which is Latin, Celtic and Gaulish traces from a late Latinisation remained present in the Savoyard language. Indeed, the main difference between Occitan and Franco-Provençal is the date of Latinisation, which for the latter was later than for the former. As a result, the Celtic substrate is much more important in the Franco-Provençal domain than in the Occitan domain, as shown by the many words from Gaulish dialects incorporated into the language.

One example is the word BLIGITICARE, meaning “to milk” in Gaulish, which in Savoyard gave bloshyi / blotsyé / blostyé [bləθi] or [bləstje], meaning “to finish milking” or “to milk a second time”. As with many other Gaulish forms that remained in Savoyard, one can observe the pejorative evolution of this word, “barbarian” in the eyes of Latin.

The Savoyard word nant, meaning “river”, which is now very common in Savoyard toponymy, is also a good example of the Celtic substrate. It is found in the Brittonic languages in related forms, such as Breton nant, meaning “canal”.

The Early Middle Ages were also the setting for barbarian invasions in Savoy, mainly by the Burgundians, who contributed a more or less significant number of words to Savoyard, such as tasson, meaning “badger”, and fata, meaning “pocket”. However, given the limited knowledge that linguists have of the Burgundian language, it is difficult to determine exactly the extent of the Burgundian substrate. It is therefore the subject of strong debate.

It should therefore be noted that Savoyard contains borrowings from Celtic languages, such as nant or nan, meaning “stream” or “torrent”, and from Burgundian, but also from neighbouring languages such as Occitan, and some from the Oïl languages. Nevertheless, the main substrate of Savoyard, as of the other Romance languages, remains Latin, including unstressed Latin final vowels, as in the name of the village La Giettaz, pronounced [ðjɛta], where the final a is barely heard.

=== From the Middle Ages to the 19th century ===
The beginning of this long historical period was marked by a phase of strong linguistic evolution and fragmentation, not limited to the Franco-Provençal area, and still unclear in the case of Savoyard. Indeed, the developments between the Oil domain and the Franco-Provençal domain occurred either in a more or less similar way, or in a completely different way.

In the 12th century, a notable development occurred similarly in both domains: the weakening or disappearance of preconsonantal s before a voiceless consonant, for example tsasté > tsaté. On the other hand, the split that had begun between the two linguistic groups under the reign of Clovis became partly more pronounced in the 13th century, especially through the reduction, in Old French, of the affricate consonants [d͡ʒ] to [ʒ] — from Latin J, D + Y, and G + A — of [t͡s] to [s], and of [t͡ʃ] to [ʃ] — from Latin C + I, E.

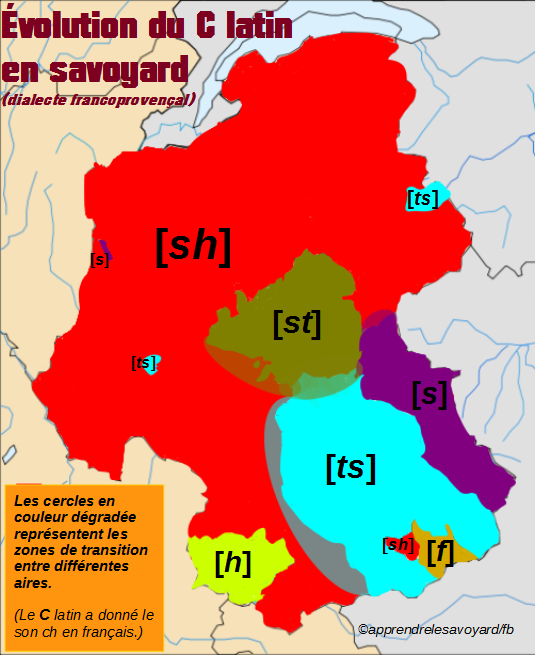
Evolution of Latin ''C'' + ''A'' in Savoyard.

Thus, from the 13th century onward, the Latin words centus and vocem evolved in French in the following way: diŭrnus gave djorn > jorn > jour, and centus gave tsentus > cent. In Franco-Provençal, however, a different pattern can be observed, as follows: cinque > tsin(q) > þẽ / [θẽ] > thin, and djor > dzor > zor, with some dialects continuing toward z or [ð], the sound of English th, except in certain parts of the Franco-Provençal area, where the forms in dz and ts were preserved for a longer or shorter period.

It is in this respect that a certain linguistic uncertainty remains, because [dz] and [ts] did not survive in exactly the same form throughout all of Savoy. Indeed, as shown by the map opposite, Latin C + A, whose original form [t͡s] gave, depending on the Savoyard variety, [st], [θ], [h], [s], and more recently [f] at Lanslebourg in the early 1900s. As for [d͡z], it gave [ʒ], [z], and [zd].

Most of these developments remain uncertain. However, the period during which [t͡s] evolved into [θ], and [d͡z] into [ʒ], is probably the one mentioned above, namely the 13th century, since it was during the same period that Spanish likewise saw its [t͡s] evolve into the inter dental [θ], identical to Savoyard sh.

The metatheses [st] and [zd] found in the Val d'Arly and the Beaufortain remain mysterious, and few explanations have been offered. One of the rare studies carried out on this subject was that of Jules Cornu, who in 1877 published his study “Métathèse de ts en st et de dz en zd” in Romania, volume 6, no. 23. He proposed an explanation according to which the sounds [zd] and [st], not being simple sounds, result from a linguistic development. He therefore argued that a development of the type ts > sts > st and dz > zdz > zd is probably at the origin of this variation, which is unique within the Franco-Provençal domain.

In addition to linguistic developments, the Middle Ages and the Renaissance were also a golden age of Savoyard literature. Numerous writings recounting important episodes in the Duchy of Savoy flourished. Thus, the texts of Jean Menenc, who in 1590 praised the merits of Charles Emmanuel I, Duke of Savoy, include the following excerpt:

David dè petit corsajut

Ot tantost met de revay

Goliaz, cé gro ravnajut,

Que facey tant le mavay.

David de petite taille

Eut tôt fait de renverser

Goliath, ce géant ravageur,

Qui était si méchant.

Texts were not always favourable to the Duchy of Savoy, as shown by Le plaisant discours d'un médecin savoyart emprisonné pour avoir donné advis au Duc de Savoye de ne croire son devin, an Old French title dating from the summer of 1600. The following is an excerpt:

Creide me, ie vo en priou, Monsiou

On Ray é bin atrou qu'on Dou

Per m'arma, ie fechi bin coire;

Y se fecha en gran colaire

E brammave com'on pati [...]

Lo ray en sa fransy n'a esta

Mai bin c'è trouva en savoay

Et é dou e ray, per ma fay! [...]

Croyez-moi, je vous en prie, monsieur,

Un roi est bien différent d'un Duc.

Par mon âme, je le fis bien bouillir (de colère)

Il se mit en grande colère

Et meuglait comme un chiffonnier. [...]

Le roi n'est pas resté dans sa France

Mais, s'est bien trouvé en Savoie,

Et il est duc et roi, par ma foi ! [...]

=== From the 19th century to the present ===
Savoyard was and remains a geographically variable language, because the formation of a unitary Franco-Provençal language was not facilitated by the territorial divisions experienced by the Rhône-Alpes region. Only Savoy, the Aosta Valley, Vaud, Geneva and Valais experienced greater linguistic independence, since they were not attached to France. Another cause of the variations in Savoyard is the presence of mountains. Indeed, this natural obstacle does not facilitate movement, due to rugged terrain, heavy snowfall, and other factors, and is the cause of the isolation of many villages and hamlets. The major effect of this near autarky is that variations can be felt between certain valleys, and sometimes even between certain villages. Franco-Provençal nevertheless continued to be used in most of the Northern Alps, including the Dauphiné, Lyonnais and Bresse.

From the 19th century onward, a very large number of studies of the Savoyard language appeared. These studies, carried out by linguists such as Aimé Constantin, Jules Gilliéron, Joseph Désormaux, Jules Cornu and Graziadio Isaia Ascoli for Franco-Provençal as a whole, led to the publication of many dictionaries, such as the Dictionnaire Savoyard by Aimé Constantin and Joseph Désormaux.

However, a certain number of studies, research works and linguistic accounts concerning Savoyard existed before this period, as shown by the following excerpt from La precellence du langage Françoys, dating from 1579:

“En Savoy, un laboureur s'en allant labourer la terre dit qu'il s'en va arar, syncopant le latin arare... Or ce mesme pays a retenu plusieurs belles paroles de la langue latine, qui ne se trouvent point ès aultres dialectes” — Henry Estienne, La precellence du langage Françoys, 1579

However, these studies were not very numerous before the 19th century, and most of them were fairly brief. But from the linguistic awareness that developed at the end of the 19th century, specialists began to travel through the Savoyard mountains in search of testimonies and information concerning the different varieties of the language.

All this research led to the publication of hundreds of reports, dictionaries and articles in linguistic journals, such as the Revue des patois gallo-romans. All of these studies were brought together by Joseph Désormaux in his Bibliographie méthodique des parlers de Savoie: langue et littérature.

Despite the growing recognition of this language in academic circles, thanks to the above-mentioned studies, compulsory learning of French, the First World War and modernization only accelerated the already ongoing decline of the Savoyard language. Thus, from the end of the Second World War, and especially around the 1960s with the rural exodus and the transformation of the rural world, Savoyard was scarcely used except among the peasantry and older people, mainly to describe tools or agricultural work.

However, since the 1980s, there has been an increasingly visible enthusiasm for Savoyard. This has been mainly due to tourism and to an awareness of the heritage value represented by Savoyard, promoted by several groups and especially by the Groupe de Conflans, through its efforts to organize competitions and to develop an orthography allowing texts to be written and collected. Moreover, like any language, Savoyard possesses the invaluable richness of reflecting a local culture — Savoyard culture in this case — including ways of working, living and inhabiting the Alpine mountains.

Echoing this dynamic, Savoyard has for several decades been taught in bilingual schools by the Association des Enseignants de Savoyard (AES), despite legislative difficulties restricting this teaching, particularly regarding the Savoyard option in the Baccalauréat, which to this day has not been authorized by the Ministry of Education. The learning of this language does not stop there, however: many patois-speaking groups throughout the Pays de Savoie organize courses or evening gatherings for learning Savoyard in different communes.

== Dialectal characteristics ==
Among the speech varieties of Savoy, there are certain specific features, both in phonetic treatment and in lexical corpus.

A frequently cited phonetic particularity is the palatalisation of the Latin group CA-, which, depending on the case, evolved into [θ] in the Annecy region, [st] in the Val d'Arly and Beaufortain, and [ts] in upper Maurienne. Thus, the word for “field”, from Latin campus, gives [θã], [stã] or [tsã] depending on the locality.

Another important characteristic concerns the names of the days of the week. In several Romance languages, these names continue a pattern in which the planetary or divine name precedes the word “day”, as in Latin-based forms such as Lunae dies, Martis dies and Mercurii dies. Savoyard, by contrast, preserves or reflects the inverse order, with dies placed first: dies Lunae, dies Martis, dies Mercurii, and so on. This gives the Savoyard forms Delon, Demârs, Demécro, Dejô or Dzou, Devendro, Dessando and Demenge.

In the lexicon, in addition to words for plant species specific to the mountain zone, such as vèrna and vèrôche for green alder, foyârd for beech, darbé for spruce, vouargno for silver fir, and shardosse for carline thistle, there are also many terms related to meteorology: bacan and bôrt temps for bad weather, coussie for storm, rosâ for shower, and niola for cloud.

Other lexical items relate to the environment, such as cllapiér and pèrrié for scree, ègrâs for stairs, bâlma for cave, tôva for peat bog, and lanshe for a sloping field. The latter is at the origin of the Savoyard word that became French avalanche, from Savoyard avâ, “to descend”, and lanshe, “field” or “sloping field”. Original expressions include fâ la pota, “to pout”, and étre louen, “to go away”. These linguistic creations strongly distinguish Savoyard from the dialects of Oïl and Oc.

== Dialectal variation ==
Contrary to the widespread idea that Savoyard varies in an archaic and undetermined manner, many isoglosses can be observed, delimiting distinct areas.

=== Notable variations ===
First person singular in Savoyard.

==== Evolution of the first person singular ====
In Savoyard, dje, from Latin ego, evolved into de in the west and north of Savoie, but into ze, zou, dze or zde in the eastern dialects.

==== Evolution of Latin C+A ====
The old form of the Franco-Provençal area for Latin C+A was ts. As stated above, it was preserved in middle Tarentaise, in the Belleville valley, and sporadically in various places in Savoy, including Mont-Saxonnex and the Bauges.

In most Savoyard dialects, namely those of the west, the north, and also of Maurienne, this earlier form gave way to the interdental sh, [θ]. However, three other areas underwent different developments: the Val d'Arly, middle Maurienne, and Haute Tarentaise. Haute Tarentaise simplified ts into s, while in middle Maurienne this form changed into h. In the Val d'Arly and the Beaufortain, [t͡s] was inverted into [st], which, unlike the former, is not a simple sound.

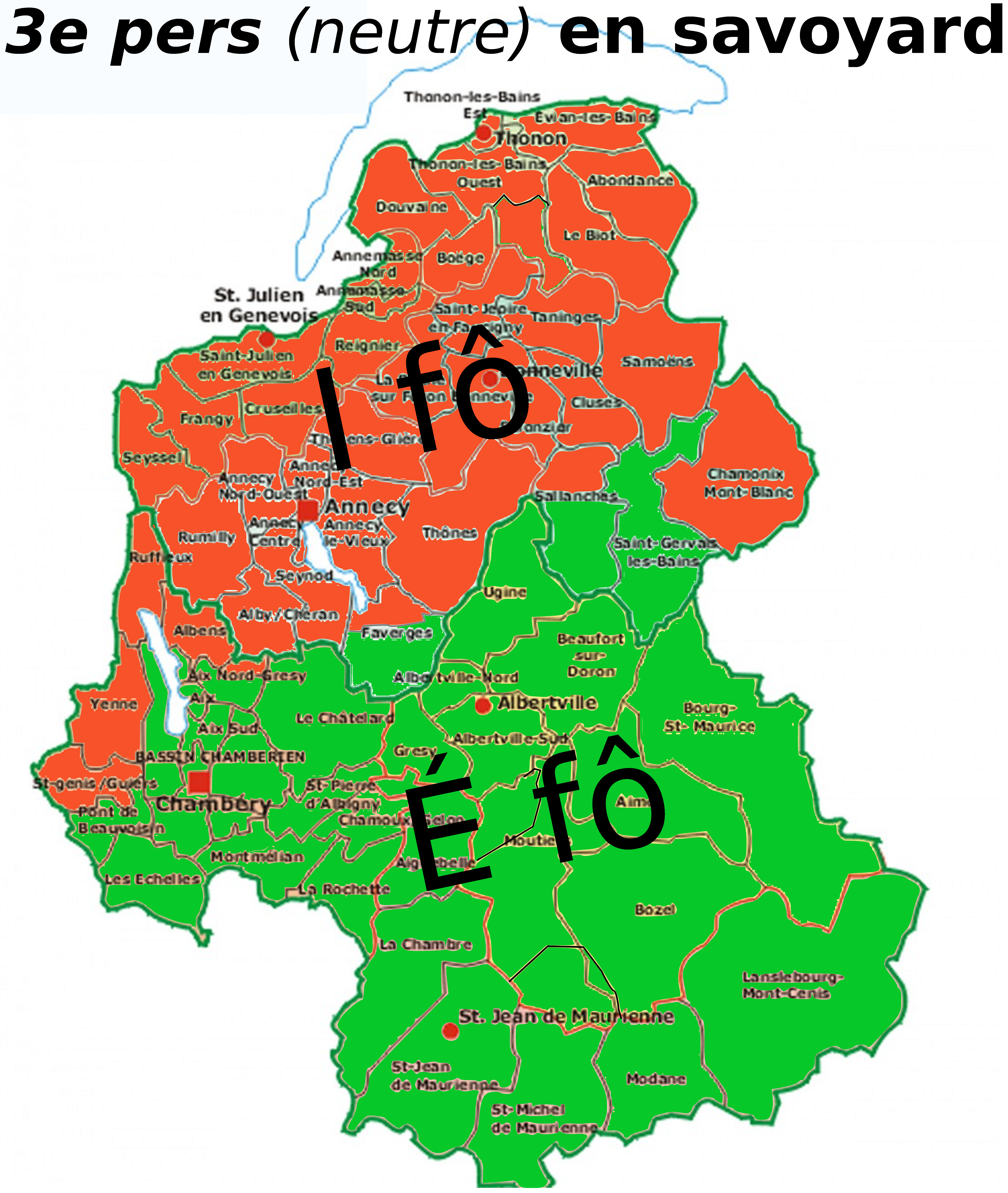
Third person singular (neuter) in Savoyard.

==== Evolution of the third person singular (neuter) ====
The third person singular, in cases where it is neuter, evolved in two different ways. In northern Savoy, it gave i, as in i plyu, “it rains”; while in the south, it is é, as in é plyu, “it rains”.

==== Evolution of Latin C+I,E ====
It may be noted that, in Savoyard, there are two major distinct zones of development; the isogloss between the two is relatively similar to that of the third person singular neuter. In the north, Latin C+I,E gave f, whose center of diffusion was probably Geneva. In the south, apart from the hiatus developments of Maurienne, C+I,E gave s in almost the entire department, except for a scattered development into sh in a few isolated places.

==== Evolution of Latin IARE verbs and short E ====
Verbs ending in Latin with the form IARE, as in Old French, gave IER, which is today the first group ending in -er. Then, in most Savoyard dialects, this ending changed into I. Only two major exceptions depart from this rule: Arly and Tarin. Indeed, these two groups, being fairly conservative, kept the form YÉ for this ending. Moreover, the evolution of Latin short E is similar and gave i in most Savoyard variants, again with the exception of Arly and Tarin, where the form é, yé remained. For example, Shi gives tsé or styé.

==== Evolution of Latin short U ====
Latin short U, which in French gave OU, evolved into a-ou in Old Franco-Provençal; various developments then followed according to the dialect. In the majority of northern dialects, with the exception of Chablais, which preserved a-o, the diphthong was simplified into the monophthong eu, perhaps under French influence, since it is identical to the form present in Old French.

In the south, this evolution into eu is only very sporadic; however, the original diphthong was not preserved everywhere either. Indeed, the sound a-ou was preserved as such only in the Beaufortain and Haute-Tarentaise, as o-ou, and changed into ô or â in areas bordering the conservative zones. Elsewhere, a-ou most often gave euy, except in the Val d'Arly, where, apart from a few words, the diphthong was reversed, giving ou-eu.

==== Evolution of Latin ST ====
The Latin group ST was simplified into t in most Savoyard speech varieties, as in French; for example, FESTA > fêta. By contrast, in Tarentaise from Moûtiers onward, as well as in middle and upper Maurienne, the group ST resulted in [θ] and then in [s], [h], [x], or may disappear completely. The distribution is fairly complicated; several forms are sometimes found within a single local speech variety. For example, at Bonneval-sur-Arc, ST normally becomes [s], but [x] before /r/.

This development is common to other Franco-Provençal regions: the upper Aosta Valley, the canton of Fribourg, and parts of the cantons of Vaud and Valais.

=== Lexical diversity ===
==== Vocabulary comparison ====
The following table compares selected Savoyard words with their equivalents in Latin, several neighboring Romance languages and English. For Savoyard, the table gives only one or more common forms; it does not attempt to list all local variants.

Latin	Savoyard	French	Piedmontese	Valdôtain	Occitan (Vivaro-Alpine)	Italian	English
Clavis	Klyâ	Clef / clé	Ciav	Cllou	Clau, Passa	Chiave	key
Cantare	Stantâ, Tsantâ, Shantâ	Chanter	Canté	Tsanté	Chantar, Cantar	Cantare	to sing
Capra	Shèvra, Styévra, Tyèvra	Chèvre	Crava	Tchiévra	Chabra, Bica	Capra	goat
Llingua	Langa	Langue	Lenga	Lenva	Lenga	Lingua	language
Nox, Noctis	Né, nuë	Nuit	Neuit	Nét	Nuech	Notte	night
Sapo, Saponis	Savon	Savon	Savon	Savon	Sabon	Sapone	soap
Sudare	Chouâ	Suer	Sudé / strasué	Sué	Suar, Susar	Sudare	to sweat
Vitae	Vya	Vie	Vita	Via	Vita, Vida	Vita	life
Pacare	Bankâ, Payé	Payer	Paghé	Payé	Paiar, Pagar	Pagare	to pay
Platea	Pl(y)asse	Place	Piassa	Place	Plaça	Piazza	place
Ecclesia	Églyéze	Église	Gesia / Cesa	Éllésé	Gleia	Chiesa	church
Caseus (formaticus)	Fromaze, Tomâ	Fromage	Formagg / Formaj	Fromadzo	Fromatge, Fromatgi	Formaggio	cheese

==== Comparison by valleys and communes ====
Français	Albanais	Thônes	Lanslevilard	La Giettaz	Chambéry	Saint-Jean-de- Maurienne	Moûtiers	Samoëns	Albertville
Chou	Tyu	Chu	Tchu	Styeû	Shu	Sheû	Tsou	Shou	Styeû
Ciel	Sé	Syé	Chyél	Cheû	Syèl	Chyé	Chîe	Syèlo	Chér
Manger	Bdjî	Mzhî	Mi'ndjér	Mzyé	Medyé	Mzhé	M'djê	Mzhî	Mezyé
Chèvre	Tyèvra	Shêvra	Tchévra	Styévra / Kàbra	Shèvra	Tyèvra	Tchévra	Shîvra	Styévra
Fatigué	Fatiguâ	Fatiguâ	Kreupar	Mafyé(tâ) / Lànyà	Fateguâ	Lasso	Mafî	Maf'itâ	Mafyé
Mettre	Mètre	M'tâ	Betâr	Betâ / Btâ	B'tâ	B'tâ	Betâ	Mètre	Betâ

Through these examples, a characteristic already discussed of Savoyard, and of Franco-Provençal in general, stands out: the variation and evolution of words according to different localities. This fluctuation of the language, especially in nouns and adjectives, is mainly due, as stated above, to the isolation of villages from one another, most often caused by relief and environmental factors such as snow.

As a result, some Savoyard varieties are more conservative than others. This is reflected in the preservation of older forms in certain patois, as in the example of the word for “iron wire”, translated as fi d'arsho or arsto in the most conservative varieties, as opposed to the forms fi de fér or fi dè fér found in varieties that have been influenced by French. These variations are more or less strong between neighbouring localities depending on the region. The most linguistically homogeneous region is the valley of Thônes, because it is enclosed by high mountains, which formerly allowed only limited contact with the outside. Even in this relatively homogeneous valley, however, variations, though minimal, do appear.

However, the study published as the Atlas linguistique et ethnographique du Jura et des Alpes du Nord, conducted by Gaston Tuaillon and Jean-Baptiste Martin, shows that, out of more than 1,500 common words, Savoyard, despite this tendency toward strong linguistic variation, had 600 that were common to all varieties of the dialect. Examples include r'nolye, “frog”, r'masse, “broom”, and modâ, “to leave”, which most often vary only by one syllable or by pronunciation.

Nevertheless, some of these words considered common to all Savoyard varieties do vary in certain isolated localities or regions. The example used above, r'nolye, is one of these words, since it appears in equivalent forms across Savoyard varieties except in Maurienne, where it changes to ran-na.

=== Main dialects ===
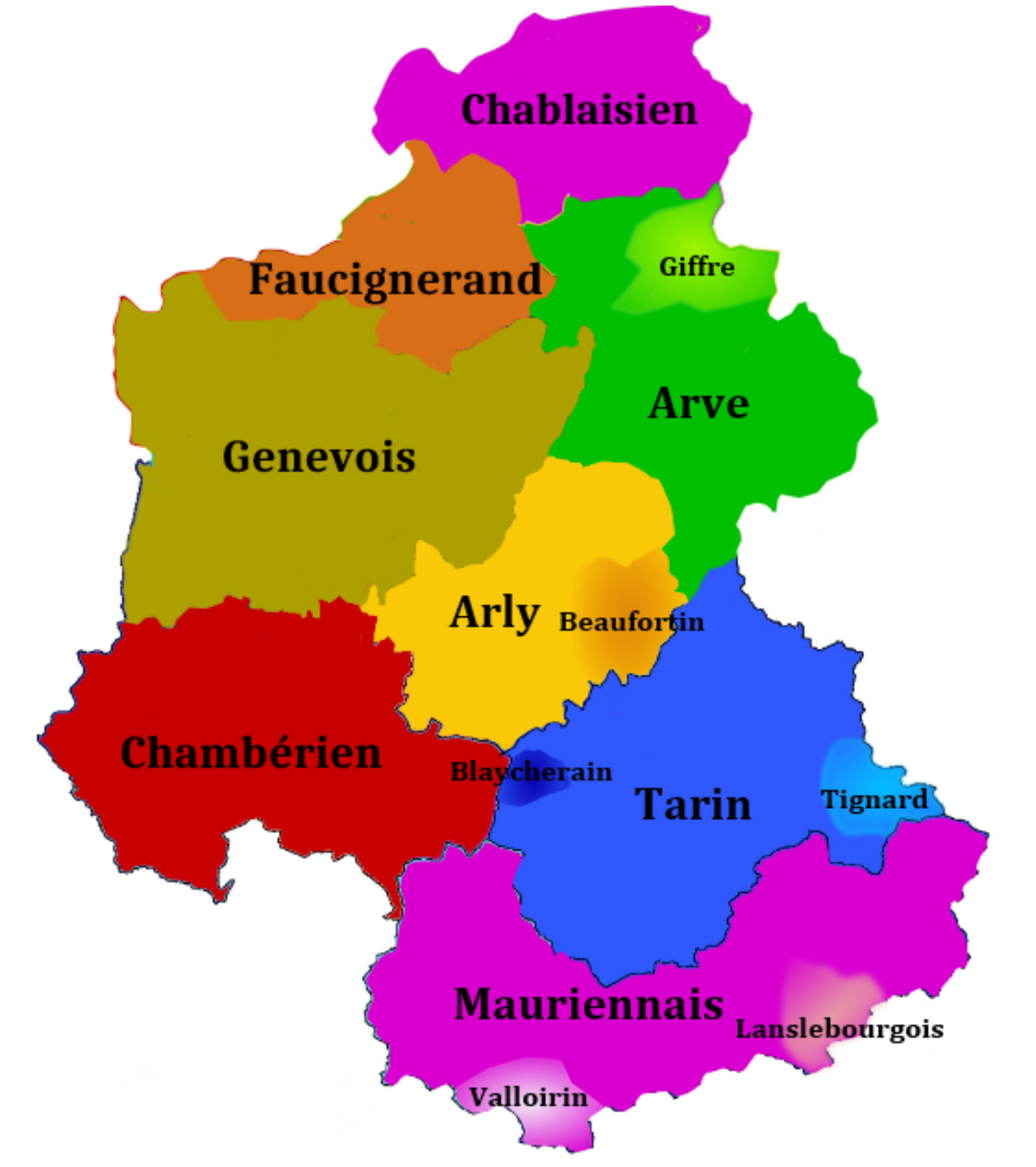
Savoyard dialects.

The preceding description of isoglosses and variations makes it possible to distinguish several major Savoyard dialect groups.

==== Tarin ====
The Tarin dialect is characterized, as stated above, by its fairly conservative character, through the maintenance of several fundamental features of Franco-Provençal, such as ts and dz. Unlike most Savoyard dialects, Tarin conjugates the verb “to be” according to the Latin forms eram, eras, erat, giving dz'érou, t'érâ, and so on, like the dialects of the Aosta Valley and Valais.

Another major characteristic of Tarin, which it shares with Mauriennais, is that it preserved final consonants, as in tsatèl, “castle”. These consonants are quite often articulated according to declension: the subject case gives tsatè, while the oblique and subject cases give tsatèl.

Within the Tarin dialect, two main special cases can be distinguished: Haute-Tarentaise, especially Tignes, and the village of Esserts-Blay. The former differs from Tarin in several respects. First, in Haute-Tarentaise, Latin C+A was simplified into s, as in al a oün sapèl tirolyin, “he has a Tyrolean hat”. It may also be noted that the diphthong a-ou changed only slightly, with the form o-ou. These differences nevertheless remain minimal in relation to the language as a whole.

Blaycherain, for its part, departs above all in the area of verbs, such as “to be”, which is most often said étre in Savoyard, but étökh in Esserts-Blay.

==== Mauriennais ====
The Mauriennais speech varieties are characterized by their many archaisms, despite a very great diversity among the local forms. One of the most striking of these archaisms is the fossilized preservation of remnants of declension. From Saint-Rémy to Termignon, the masculine singular adjective used as a subject complement takes a form identical to that of the plural, inherited from the Latin nominative. Thus, at Saint-Martin-de-la-Porte, “the ripe pear” is said lo pezhuit mòy (Latin maturum), but “the pear is ripe” is lo pezhuit é mour (Latin maturus). Similarly, in the plural the sentence is lo pezhui son mour (Latin maturos).

At Villarembert, Fontcouverte and Saint-Pancrace, the declension system is even better preserved and affects masculine singular subject nouns and the definite article. One says le fòr é hhô, “the oven is hot”, but d'é éhheuyda lo fòrt, “I heated the oven”. This alternation between the subject-case form le fòr and the oblique-case form lo fòrt is found for a series of nouns that continue to decline in this way.

Another archaizing feature of Maurienne is the preservation of the infinitive r, found in several villages of middle and upper Maurienne. In middle Maurienne, this final r often merges with final l and becomes [r], [l], [ð], [t] or [n], depending on the village. Thus, “to sing” and “beautiful” are said shantèr and bèr, shantèl and bèl, shantèzh and bèzh, and so on.

A number of villages, especially in middle Maurienne, preserve the unstressed final t of the third person singular: Latin CANTAT becomes shantèt, “he sings”.

The last two villages of the valley, Bonneval-sur-Arc and Bessans, preserve the final plural -s: la vatsé, lé vatsés.

Some pronunciations are indeed endemic to Maurienne, and among these, three are particularly notable. The first is the pronunciation of Latin on, which in most Savoyard dialects is pronounced [ɔ̃] or [ɔɳ], whereas in Mauriennais it is pronounced [ũ], written oün. The second typical Mauriennais sound is [ỹ], as in pün, “fist”. The third is [ĩ], as in pïn, “pine”, a sound unknown in French and in Savoyard outside this area, like the other sounds. A second feature, less visible at first sight, is the difference in vocabulary found in certain words; the earlier example of r'nolye, which gives ran-na in Maurienne, is one of the clearest examples.

The pronunciation of the palatalized consonants Latin C+A and Latin C+I,E is very diverse. Latin C+I,E results in sh, hh, or a hiatus, especially in upper Maurienne. For the evolution of CA, sh dominates most of the valley, but ts is also found, especially in upper Maurienne and at Saint-Sorlin-d'Arves. The sh evolved into hh around Saint-Jean-de-Maurienne, as in hhyèvra, “goat”, into f at Lanslebourg, as in vafe, “cow”, and into s at Termignon, as in sòl, “cabbage”.

The voiced variants are generally the equivalents of the voiceless forms, for example sh = zh, ts = dz, and so on, but zh becomes d at Valmeinier and tends to disappear in the Saint-Jean-de-Maurienne area.

==== Arly ====
This Savoyard dialect, following the course of the Arly, may first be seen as a relatively homogeneous Savoyard variety. This group differs from the others in several major respects, including the already mentioned metathesis of ts into st throughout the Arly area, and to a lesser extent of dz into zd. In addition to this main characteristic, several others are endemic to this dialect.

First, the evolution of stressed short O into ou-eu, as in porta > poueurta, for example le boueu, “the stable”. It may also be noted that the evolution of Latin C+A into st was sometimes accompanied by the addition of a y after st, as in styé, “at” or “chez”. The y was also preserved as such in many cases, as discussed above in the section on the evolution of Latin IARE verbs and short E, especially with verbs in -yé descending from Latin verbs ending in IARE, as well as with many words that evolved into i in the rest of the Savoyard dialects.

==== Chambérian ====
Chambérian may be viewed as the dialect of Savoie Propre, excluding Arly, characterized mainly by its own lexical variants. The most striking case is the evolution of the demonstrative pronoun “that one” in this region. Indeed, in most other dialects it gives s'li, s'lé, or even sétye in Arly; however, in the Chambérian dialect, it gives, without exception, chô, as in y'è chô ki fô sin, “it is that one who does that”.

Another similar development is that of the preposition “voilà”, which evolved into forms such as vétyà or vatchà, and tlé in Faucignerand, but which is present in the Chambérian dialect in the form vékà, also found sporadically in a few other places.

The Chambérian dialect, like Faucignerand, is also characterized by the influence of French, especially in part of its vocabulary. Thus, several prepositions such as tanke, tinke, or ’four, d'feur, meaning “outside”, have, with a few exceptions, given way to jusk’, jeusk’ and d'yôr, d'jôr, forms influenced by French.

This influence is also present in vocabulary, as with the word shalande, which appears, especially in the western part of the Chambérian dialect area, in the forms noyé in the feminine and no-é. Conjugation is also, to a lesser extent, influenced by French, mainly with the pronoun "elle" (she) and the past participle of the verb “to have”. Thus, the pronoun "elle" (she), which is most often represented by lé or yé in Savoyard, gives èl in most of the Chambérian area. For the past participle of “to have”, one finds a form closer to French than avu or awu, with zu or yeû, as in No on-n-a yeû in Petit-Bugey and No on-n-a zu in Arvillard.

== Some words ==
Several subdialects of Savoyard exist that exhibit unique features in terms of phonetics and vocabulary. This includes many words that have to do with the weather: bacan (French: temps mauvais); coussie (French: tempête); royé (French: averse); ni[v]ole (French: nuage); ...and, the environment: clapia, perrier (French: éboulis); égra (French: sorte d'escalier de pierre); balme (French: grotte); tova (French: tourbière); and lanche (French: champ en pente).

== Linguistic studies ==
Savoyard has been the subject of detailed study at the Centre de dialectologie of the Stendhal University, Grenoble, currently under the direction of Michel Contini.

== See also ==
- Languages of France
- Franco-Provençal
- Valdôtain
