= Savoyard diaspora =

The Savoyard diaspora refers to the migratory movements of the native population originating from Savoy, a historical region corresponding today mainly to the two French departments of Savoie and Haute-Savoie, during different periods of history, especially from the 18th century to the mid-20th century.

Savoy also became a land of immigration towards the very end of the 19th century, and more significantly during the following century.

== History ==
According to Gilbert Maistre, a specialist in local emigration, Savoyard migrations were “a permanent feature and a major fact of the human geography of the duchy”. The historian Abel Poitrineau described this phenomenon, in an essay published in 1982, as remues d'hommes, meaning temporary movements of people. These migrations were intended in particular to reduce the number of mouths to feed during the winter season.

Both the destinations and the causes of departure varied according to the period. The receiving areas were mainly neighboring regions, including France, Italy and German-speaking areas such as Alsace, Germany, Austria and Switzerland, as well as the New World, North Africa and Russia. This traditional migration responded, among other things, to the lack of sufficient local resources to support a large population, to the need to find additional income during the long winter period, and to the desire to obtain a better standard of living.

During the medieval period, Savoyards emigrated mainly within the States of Savoy, especially to Piedmont and the Pays de Vaud, as well as to neighboring regions such as Franche-Comté, Geneva, Lorraine, and more generally various German-speaking regions, and also to France, especially the Lyonnais and Paris regions.

=== Contemporary migrations ===
In the 18th century, Savoyard migrations were seasonal, then became permanent during the 19th century. At first, the destinations were neighboring regions, including France, Switzerland, Italy and the Holy Roman Empire, before tending towards more distant destinations. These migrations were also shaped by Savoy's history and its links with France, since, after being attached to the French Republic from 1792 and then to the First French Empire, Savoy experienced conscription into the armies of the Revolution and then into the Napoleonic armies.

At the beginning of the 19th century, the population of the duchy was estimated at 583,000 inhabitants, corresponding to its demographic peak. During the 1830s and 1840s, according to the testimony of Joseph Depoisier, the number of departures was 30,000 per year.

A 2018 research report for the Musée Savoisien, titled Les flux migratoires en Savoie et Haute-Savoie, 1860–2015, states that after the former Duchy of Savoy was incorporated into France in 1860, the department of Savoie was less affected by migration than neighboring Haute-Savoie, which also had a proportion of foreigners in its total population almost twice as low.

==== To France ====
The destinations were diverse, at first in neighbouring towns and regions, such as the Swiss cantons and Lyon, but after the revolutionary annexation of 1792, Savoyards increasingly moved towards Paris.

Population of Savoie, 1860–1926

Historical population

Year	Pop.	±% p.a.
1860	275,039	—
1866	271,663	−0.21%
1876	268,361	−0.12%
1890	259,790	−0.23%

Year	Pop.	±% p.a.
1901	254,781	−0.18%
1911	247,890	−0.27%
1921	225,034	−0.96%
1926	231,210	+0.54%

Source: Archives départementales de la Savoie

Population of Haute-Savoie, 1860–1926

Historical population

Year	Pop.	±% p.a.
1860	267,496	—
1866	273,768	+0.39%
1876	273,801	+0.00%
1890	265,872	−0.21%

Year	Pop.	±% p.a.
1901	263,803	−0.07%
1911	255,137	−0.33%
1921	235,668	−0.79%
1926	245,317	+0.81%

Source: Archives départementales de la Savoie

If the annual number of departures in the 18th century is estimated at about 30,000, there were about 100,000 Savoyards living in France at the beginning of the 1840s, or about 18% of the total population of the duchy. The historian Paul Guichonnet notes that, with 20,000 migrants in 1834 and 42,000 residents in 1860, “Paris became the largest Savoyard city, since Chambéry had only 19,000 inhabitants and Annecy 10,000”.

At the local level, these migratory dynamics affected the population of certain communes and valleys touched by the phenomenon. From 1886 onward, the two Savoyard departments lost inhabitants, with a decline of 7%. Over half a century, their populations decreased by 9.87% for Savoie and 4.62% for Haute-Savoie. Without taking into account seasonal workers heading to the Lyon or Paris regions or to southern France, the gross population loss for the Savoyard departments has been estimated at 100,000 inhabitants.

François Cochat, director of the municipal museum of Thônes, observed in his history of Le Grand-Bornand that the number of inhabitants of the commune, which had been 2,400, had fallen by 1859 to 1,995. He attributed this decrease to emigration, which each year took away “the flower of its youth”. According to Cochat, for young people aged 18 to 24, going to Paris had become almost a necessity, and around 1850 Le Grand-Bornand had 500 to 600 of its children abroad.

In France, these immigrants were often viewed unfavourably by French people. Parisian posters from 1850 accused them of monopolising jobs and taking French wealth by saving excessively. These posters even proposed an additional tax, for fear that their behaviour would harm the country's economy.

==== To the New World ====
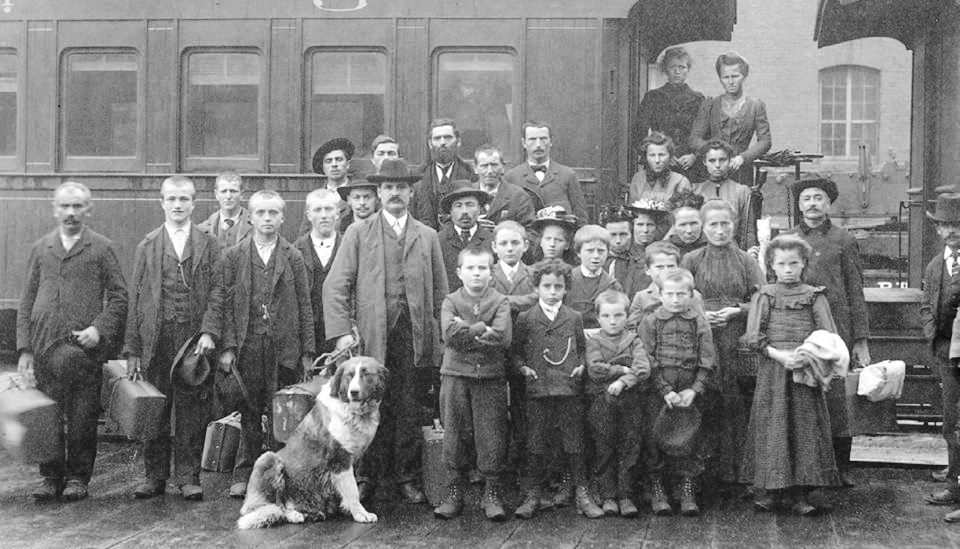
First contingent of Savoyard immigrants en route to Lac-Saint-Jean, 16 May 1904.

In the 19th century, Savoyard migration followed the flow of wider European migration to the Americas, especially to Canada, including the province of Saskatchewan, the United States, mainly Ohio and Louisiana, Mexico, Uruguay, Brazil and Argentina.

Canon Marcel Dechavassine, in his synthesis on the migration of people from the Faucigny to America, noted that the reasons for these departures from Savoy were neither poverty nor tax burdens, but significant demographic growth. The choice of destinations differed according to the provinces: Dechavassine observed that inhabitants of the Faucigny turned rather towards Canada and North Africa, while those of the Chablais went towards Argentina. The phenomenon increased especially from the 1870s, with vineyards ravaged by phylloxera, but also with the crisis of the Swiss watchmaking industry, on which part of the Savoyard population depended. The choice of emigration also seems to have been favoured over enlistment in the Sardinian army during the Crimean War and the Italian Wars of Independence.

Migration to Argentina developed, and no fewer than 4,000 Savoyards left between 1860 and 1914. After arriving at San José de Feliciano, the Savoyard settlers moved in particular to the new villages of San José, founded in 1858, Villa Elisa, founded in 1890, and Colón, founded in 1890, in the province of Entre Ríos. This emigration has been studied in particular by the Savoyard historian Claude Châtelain.

Châtelain estimates that the first Savoyard settler to establish himself in this part of the world dates from the very beginning of the 1820s. This Savoyard, Antoine Dunoyer, born in 1810, was a merchant established in Buenos Aires and originally from Montmélian. He had been Sardinian consul general since 1849. With his brother Gabriel, an architect in Chambéry, he publicised in the press of the duchy the opportunities available to candidates for the New World. They notably had a brochure published, titled Émigration savoisienne - Renseignements à la classe ouvrière; République de La Plata (1853–1854). Among the Savoyards who went to Argentina, Claude Martin, originally from the Avant-Pays savoyard, enriched himself in trade and returned to settle in Chambéry, where he became a benefactor of the city.

The Savoyard presence in the United States began at the very beginning of the 19th century. Nicolas Girod played a role comparable to that of a consul for this region. According to Canon François Pochat-Baron, Girod came to Louisiana with two of his brothers, nephews, and a little more than twenty inhabitants of Thônes. Nicolas Girod became mayor of New Orleans, serving from 1812 until his resignation in 1815. His nephew, Joseph-Marie Girod, is also said to have been the first magistrate of that city. The people of Thônes who left for the Americas were called the “Englishmen of Thônes”. In the wake of the Girods came people from the Faucigny, especially from Samoëns.

A few individuals from the villages of Brizon and Mont-Saxonnex settled in southern Chile.

It was not until 1873 that New France was proposed as a destination for emigration. The first recorded departures occurred especially in the Bonneville region, before reaching the Roche region, including Amancy, Arenthon and Saint-Sixt. A colony made up of people from the Chablais and the Faucigny settled at Duck Lake, in northern Canada.

==== To North Africa ====
The settlement of Savoyards in North Africa, especially in Algeria and more particularly in the region of Sétif in the east, was due in part to the Compagnie genevoise des colonies suisses. This migration began in the 1850s. Of the ten villages established, two, Mahouane and El Ouricia, were inhabited by Savoyards, mainly from the Annecy region.

In an article on the emigration of populations from the province of Faucigny, Canon Dechavassine noted that Algeria became the preferred land of emigration for this region from the 1870s, especially between 1873 and 1878. This period was linked above all to the watchmaking crisis. Dechavassine counted the number of migrants by village and stated that families from the Faucigny were found on the high plateaus of Sétif:

At Ampère, there are Orsats from La Rivière-Enverse and Millets from Marignier; at St-Donat and St-Arnaud, Crochets from Peillonnex and Gervais from Marnaz; at La Fayette and Aïn-Abessa, Blancs and Guyots from Mégevette, Dussaix, Perrier and Robert from Thyez; at Fermatou, Tourniers from Bonneville; farther south, in the Colbert region, one still finds Saulniers from Vougy, not counting all the other names that escaped our investigation.

He further noted that among the families who came from Savoy to live in Jemmapes or Auribeau, several were originally from Nangy.

==== To Egypt and East Africa ====
Egypt and its surrounding region attracted certain Savoyard adventurers, especially from Maurienne. In 1831, Jacques Brun, known as Antoine Brun-Rollet, travelled there and traded with the peoples of Abyssinia before undertaking an expedition in the region of the upper Nile valley. He became Sardinian proconsul at Khartoum.

In 1839, the Mauriennais explorer Alexandre Vaudey also arrived in the country and became a teacher. In 1852, he became Sardinian proconsul. He was joined by his two nephews, Jules Poncet and Ambroise Poncet, who undertook expeditions in eastern Africa, especially in search of the sources of the Nile.

== Activities of Savoyard migrants ==
Savoyard migrants practiced many occupations after settling in their host regions. In collective memory, however, the most persistent image is that of the chimney sweep, especially of children practicing this trade.

=== Chimney sweeps ===
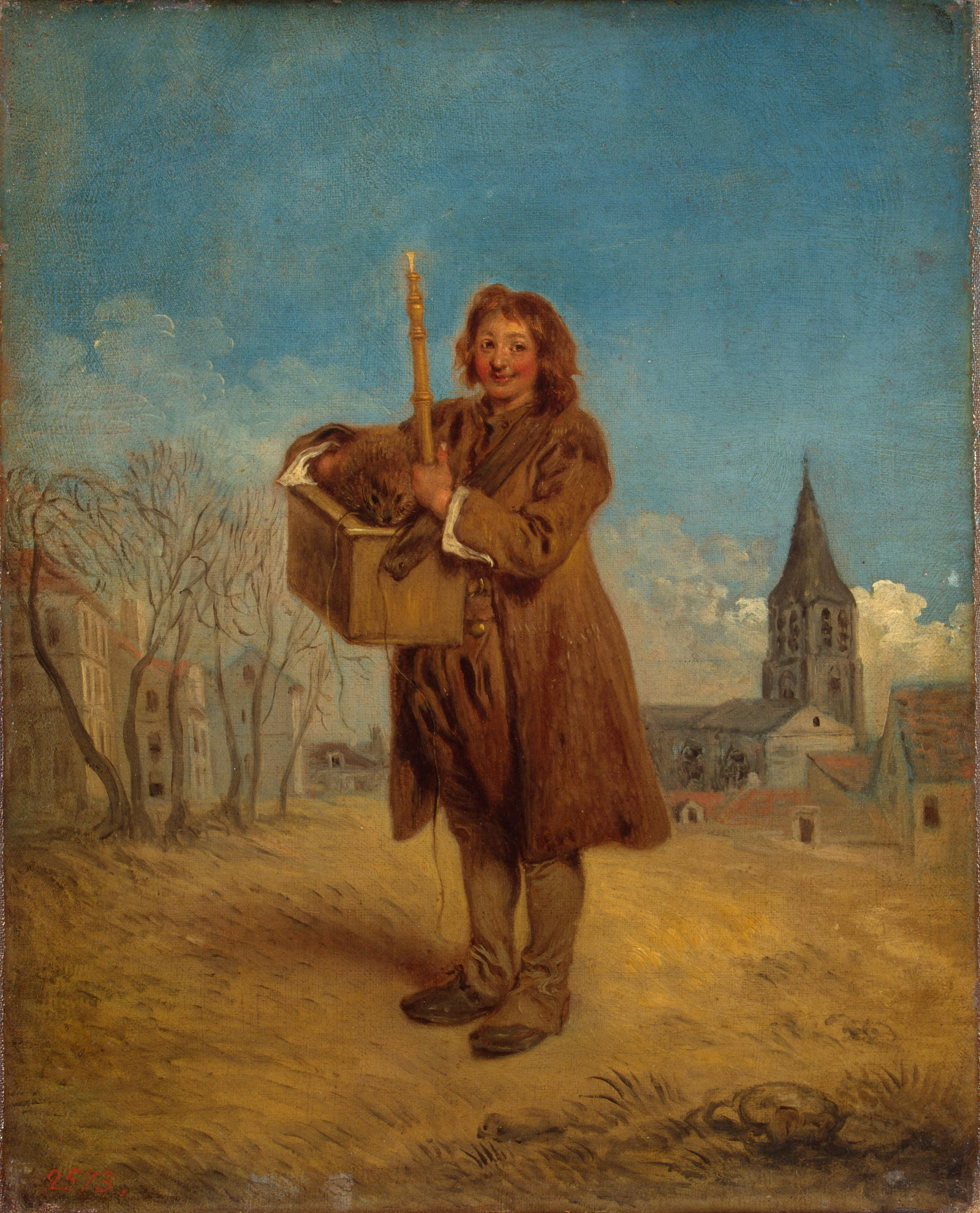
Le Savoyard et la marmotte, painting by Antoine Watteau, 1716.

In the collective imagination, both in France and in German-speaking countries, the Savoyard migrant remained associated with the figure of the chimney sweep. Historical reality, however, was different, since chimney sweeps represented only a small percentage of migrants. According to a study carried out by the priest Louis Rendu in 1838, out of 22,655 recorded migrants, chimney sweeps represented only 400 individuals, slightly less than 2% of those who left. Moreover, it appears that most chimney sweeps in Paris were actually from Auvergne.

As buildings evolved, the chimneys of apartments and houses became narrower. Because of fire risks and regulations, these chimneys had to be cleaned regularly. The use of child labour then became necessary. These children were recruited in Savoy in autumn by an employer, who usually promised to take care of them, but once in town often left them to beg for food. The children were regularly beaten if they did not bring back enough money at the end of their work. Recruitment of these children took place mainly in the Maurienne valley and in some villages of Tarentaise.

The authors who reproduced the 1845 inquiry of Bishop Rendu in Mœurs et coutumes de la Savoie du Nord au XIXe siècle give the example of the Thônes valleys, with testimony concerning the practices of the “master chimney sweeps who took young children with them”. They notably cite the testimony of the mayor of Thônes in 1811, also quoted by the local canon and historian François Pochat-Baron.

Pochat-Baron states that the mayor informed the sub-prefect that the communes affected by this phenomenon in the valleys were Les Clefs, Manigod and Serraval. The parish priest of Serraval, in the Aravis, noted in a section devoted to these migrations that around one hundred men emigrated in winter to peddle goods and sweep chimneys in France, while others went to Paris.

These master chimney sweeps took away around 80 children each year, including twenty from each of the communes of Les Clefs and Manigod and forty from Serraval. They promised to feed them, provide them with a new pair of shoes and some rags, and pay the parents of each child a sum varying from ten to twenty-five francs. The migration took place mainly in the departments of the Marne, Aisne and neighbouring areas.

Once in town, these children were forced to beg in order to feed themselves. They were also regularly beaten if they did not bring back enough money at the end of their work.

These working conditions for children drew reactions from some voices, especially within the clergy. On 16 March 1862, Abbé C. F. Bugnot, director of the diocesan work of Chalon-sur-Saône, wrote a petition-letter to the Senate concerning the exploitation of young Savoyards. The following year, he published a brochure titled Les petits Savoyards ou l'exploitation de l'enfant par l'homme. The denunciation did not lead to any particular institutional attention to the issue. Only a few religious figures acted at their own level, notably in Dijon with Abbé Joly from 1664, in Paris with Abbé de Pontbriand in 1735, and through diocesan charitable works.

=== Variety of occupations ===
Different authors, including Gilbert Maistre, have noted the variety of occupations practised by Savoyard migrants — sometimes described as “36 trades” — and especially the tendency towards specialisation according to valley or province of origin. Beyond chimney sweeps and marmot exhibitors, migrants practised a wide range of occupations, from unskilled to more skilled work, including pedlars, knife-grinders, merchants, gelders, farmers, cab drivers from Haute-Maurienne, teachers, and the “red collars” of the Hôtel Drouot.

For Paris in 1838, the figures given were approximately “5,000 day labourers, 2,000 factory workers, 1,000 apprentice workers, 2,000 bootblacks, 1,000 porters, 400 water carriers [...] 500 cab drivers, 1,000 commission agents and couriers, 300 teachers and tutors, 100 bookkeepers and cashiers”.

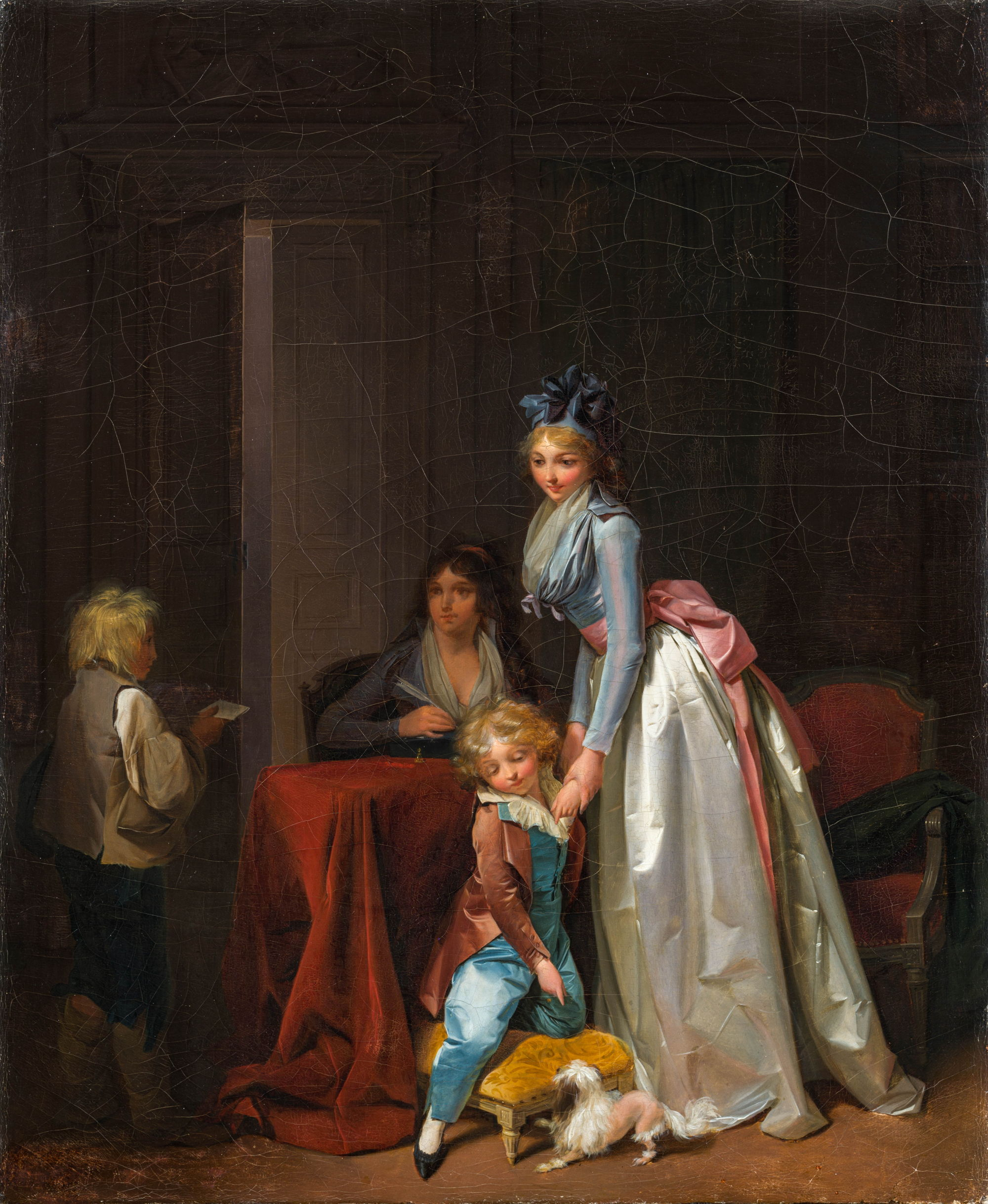
Le Messager, also known as Le Commissionnaire, by Louis-Léopold Boilly, c. 1793.

Seasonal workers left their villages to carry out various kinds of work, particularly agricultural work in neighbouring regions, or to pursue other activities in towns.

Among seasonal workers from the Faucigny, and more particularly from the Giffre valley around Samoëns, the preferred trades were masonry, stonework and woodworking, especially carpentry. This specialisation is observed from the medieval period to the 19th century. They were found in particular on construction sites building forts on the eastern border of the Kingdom of France.

Migrants from Haut-Faucigny, including Cluses, Magland and Sallanches, specialised in itinerant copperwork, tinning and the repair of kitchen utensils, known as magnin work. Their number in the 18th century is estimated at more than 300 individuals. A permit became necessary in order to work in Switzerland. The inhabitants of Chamonix became shepherds.

From the Chablais region came knife-grinders, especially from Boëge, and sharpeners. Men and children travelled to neighbouring regions during the winter season. Unlike other trades, their earnings remained very modest. However, long-distance migration led some of them to turn to small-scale haberdashery trade.

More specifically, migrants from the commune of La Côte-d'Arbroz became sellers of garden seeds between the 18th and 20th centuries. These merchants obtained their supplies in the Loire Valley and sold their products by emphasising their supposed resistance because of their mountain origin. In 1952, around forty inhabitants were still practising this activity.

The inhabitants of the high valleys of Haute-Savoie and Haute-Tarentaise became commission agents in Paris, the future “red collars”. In 1860, they obtained from Emperor Napoleon III a Savoyard monopoly over the Union des commissionnaires de l'Hôtel des ventes, an organisation created by Auvergnats around 1832. The corporation had 90 members in 1891, and grew from 110 members in 1920 to 2010.

In Maurienne, men from Montpascal became schoolmasters.

The inhabitants of Arith, in the Bauges, worked as gelders and exported their know-how to southern France. At the same time, they sold Comtoise clocks.

== Savoyard mutual aid ==
Savoyard mutual-aid societies, also known as philanthropic societies, appeared from the 19th century. Present in the Kingdom of Sardinia, they developed more particularly in France after the law of 15 July 1850.

=== Société philanthropique savoisienne de Paris ===
The Société philanthropique savoisienne de Paris was a mutual-aid society founded in Paris on 11 August 1833. It was considered the oldest institution of mutual aid and patronage for all emigrants in the capital. Its motto was “Unity, Charity”. It was recognised as being of public utility in 1896 and received a gold medal at the Exposition Universelle.

As living conditions in Paris were difficult, successful Savoyards founded a mutual-aid society. Among them were the lawyers François Quétand (1804–1866) and Basile Rubin (1793–1866), both from La Roche, the dean of the Faculty of Law Albert-Paul Royer-Collard (1797–1865), the radical politician Émile Chautemps, from Valléry, the physicians Paul Caffe (1803–1876), head of clinic at the Hôtel-Dieu de Paris, and Jacques Coster (1795–1868), from Chapeiry, the manufacturer Joseph Agnolet, from Saint-Jean-de-Sixt, and the chemist Darbier, from Moûtiers. Its presidents were regarded as a kind of unofficial consul of Savoy in Paris.

The statutes of the association described it as essentially philanthropic. Its purpose was to bring together Savoyards living in Paris, provide them with instruction, expand commercial relations among them, procure employment and work for those without it, give assistance in kind or money to those in need, ensure that they were cared for during illness, and establish a bond of fraternity among them so that they could help and support one another.

=== Savoyard societies around the world ===
Other Savoyard associations included:

- The Alliance catholique savoisienne in Paris, founded in particular by the lawyer and politician Jules Challamel (1853–1927). Challamel was also vice-president of the Société philanthropique in 1905, then its president from 1908 to 1910, and general councillor for the canton of Sallanches from 1907 to 1913;
- The Association savoisienne philanthropique, founded in 1878 in Lyon.

== Contemporary associations ==
=== Federation of Savoyards of the World ===
The Federation of Savoyards of the World was created in 2013 and succeeded the Union mondiale des associations de Savoyards, which had been established in 1990. It brings together associations of Savoyards in different parts of the world. The federation organises a large annual gathering during the first weekend of August.

During the celebrations for its 85th anniversary, the federation brought together around one hundred of its members at Aillon-le-Jeune during the weekend of 4 August 2018. At that time, it counted 23 member associations, mainly based in Europe: 16 in France and 7 abroad, in Argentina, Canada, the United Arab Emirates, Qatar, Singapore and Uruguay.

The Union mondiale des Savoyards was founded in 1933 by Senator Antoine Borrel and Deputy Louis Martel. It became a federation in 1990.

=== List of associations ===
The website of the Federation of Savoyards of the World provides a list of affiliated associations. The association Savoie-Argentine today brings together descendants of Savoyards who settled in Argentina.

== Bibliography ==
=== Collected works and special issues ===
- Les Savoyards dans le monde: recherches sur l'émigration. Actes du colloque d'Annecy, 13 et 14 décembre 1991. Mémoires et documents (in French). Vol. 94. Chambéry: Société savoisienne d'histoire et d'archéologie. 1992. p. 382.
- "Émigrés savoyards, immigrés en Savoie". Hommes & Migrations (in French) (1166). June 1993.
- Maistre, Gilbert (1993). "Les anciennes migrations savoyardes". Hommes & Migrations (in French) (1166): 10–17.
- Guichonnet, Paul (1993). "Politique et émigration savoyarde à l'époque des nationalités, 1848–1860". Hommes & Migrations (in French) (1166): 18–22.
- Dechavassine, Marcel (1958). "L'émigration des Faucignerands dans les Pays d'outre-mer". Mémoires et documents publiés par l'Académie du Faucigny (in French) (11): 33–48.
- Dechavassine, Marcel (1958). "L'émigration savoyarde en Algérie, 1855–1914". Revue savoisienne (in French) (9): 148–175.
- Dechavassine, Marcel (1959). "L'émigration savoyarde au Canada". Revue savoisienne (in French) (3): 27–82.
- Dechavassine, Marcel (1960). "L'émigration des Faucignerands en Franche-Comté". Mémoires et documents publiés par l'Académie du Faucigny (in French) (12): 45–61.
- Dechavassine, Marcel (1961). "Rôle des agences d'émigration dans l'exode savoyard au XIXe siècle". Bulletin du Comité des travaux historiques et scientifiques, Section d'histoire moderne et contemporaine (in French): 475–489.
- Dechavassine, Marcel (1962). "L'émigration des Faucignerands en Bavière et en Autriche". Mémoires et documents publiés par l'Académie du Faucigny (in French): 31–67.
- Dechavassine, Marcel (1966). "L'émigration savoyarde dans les pays de langue allemande". Congrès des sociétés savantes de Savoie (in French): 86–97.
- Forni, Jules (1889). Histoire de la Société philanthropique savoisienne de Paris: discours prononcé en assemblée générale par M. Forni (in French). Bureaux du journal Paris-Savoie. p. 43.
- Guichonnet, Paul (1945). "L'émigration saisonnière en Faucigny pendant la première moitié du XIXe siècle, 1783–1860". Revue de géographie alpine (in French). 33 (3): 465–534.
- Guichonnet, Paul (1948). "L'émigration alpine vers les pays de langue allemande". Revue de géographie alpine (in French). 36 (4): 533–576.
- Guichonnet, Paul (1983). "Les Sociétés savoyardes à Paris". Actes du XXIXe Congrès des Sociétés savantes de Savoie: La sociabilité des savoyards (in French). Le Bourget-du-Lac. pp. 281–298.
- Guichonnet, Paul (2008). "L'émigration des Savoyards dans le Nouveau Monde". 133e congrès, Québec, 2008: Migrations, transferts et échanges de part et d'autre de l'Atlantique (in French). Comité des travaux historiques et scientifiques, Section d'histoire moderne et contemporaine.
- L'émigration savoyarde au XIXe–XXe siècles. L'Histoire en Savoie nouvelle série (in French). Vol. 29. Chambéry: Société savoisienne d'histoire et d'archéologie. 2015. p. 148. ISBN 978-2-85092-032-5.
- Letonnelier, Gaston (1920). "L'émigration des Savoyards". Revue de géographie alpine (in French) (4): 541–584.
- Maistre, Chantal; Maistre, Gilbert (1986). L'émigration marchande savoyarde aux XVIIIe et XIXe siècles: l'exemple de Nancy-sur-Cluses. Mémoires et documents (in French). Vol. 94. Annecy: Académie salésienne. p. 311.
- Milbach, Sylvain (2010). Savoie, terre ouverte XVIe–XIXe siècles. L'Histoire en Savoie nouvelle série (in French). Vol. 20. Chambéry: Société savoisienne d'histoire et d'archéologie. p. 224. ISBN 978-2-85092-018-9.
- Nicolas, Jean; Nicolas, Renée (2005) [1972]. La vie quotidienne en Savoie aux XVIIIe et XIXe siècles (in French). Montmélian: La Fontaine de Siloé. p. 284. ISBN 978-2-84206-296-5.
- Palluel-Guillard, André, ed. (1986). Histoire de Savoie: La Savoie de Révolution française à nos jours, XIXe–XXe siècle (in French). Rennes: Ouest France Université. p. 626. ISBN 2-85882-536-X.
- Raynaud, Franziska (2001). Savoyische Einwanderungen in Deutschland (in German). Degener & Co. p. 279. ISBN 978-3-76864-216-3.
- Tissot, Eugène (1876–1877). "Les Savoyards en Égypte". Revue savoisienne (in French).
