= Le Châtel =

Le Châtel Lo Shâshé (Savoyard)
- Part of La Tour-en-Maurienne
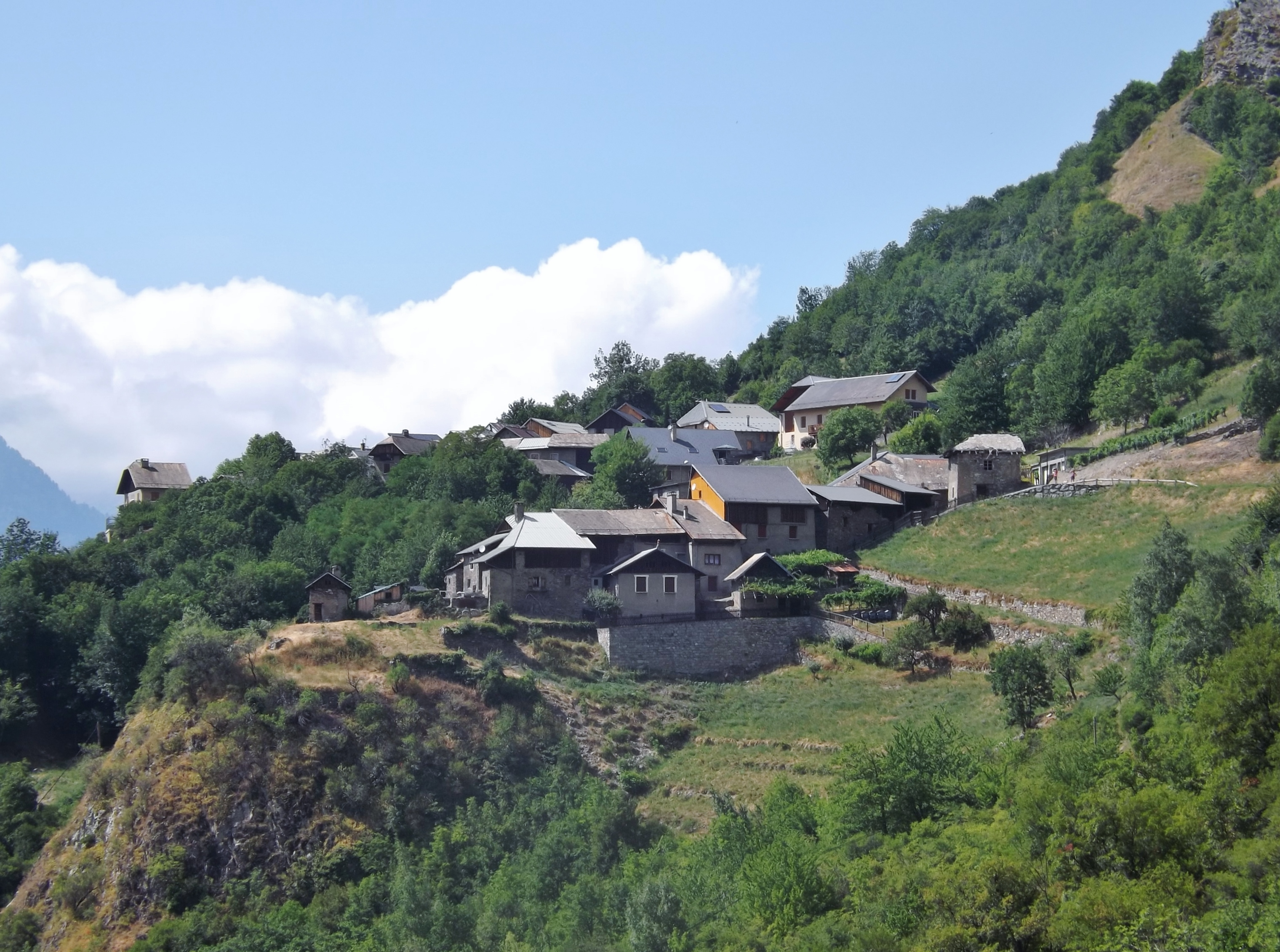
- View of the village, from the road to Hermillon
- Location of Le Châtel
- Location within France Location within Auvergne-Rhône-Alpes
- Coordinates: 45°18′28″N 6°21′34″E
- Country: France
- Region: Auvergne-Rhône-Alpes
- Department: Savoie
- Arrondissement: Saint-Jean-de-Maurienne
- Canton: Saint-Jean-de-Maurienne
- Commune: La Tour-en-Maurienne
- Area^{1}: 15.31 km^{2} (5.91 sq mi)
- Highest elevation: 1,531 m (5,023 ft)
- Lowest elevation: 560 m (1,840 ft)
- Population (2022): 172
  - Density: 11.2/km^{2} (29.1/sq mi)
- Time zone: UTC+01:00 (CET)
  - Summer (DST): UTC+02:00 (CEST)
- Postal code: 73300
- Website: www.le-chatel.com
- ^{1} French Land Register data, which excludes lakes, ponds, glaciers > 1 km^{2} (0.386 sq mi or 247 acres) and river estuaries.

Le Châtel (Savoyard: Lo Shâshé) is a former commune in the Savoie department in the Auvergne-Rhône-Alpes region in south-eastern France. On 1 January 2019, it was merged into the new commune La Tour-en-Maurienne.

== See also ==
- Communes of the Savoie department
