= La Tour-en-Maurienne =

- Commune
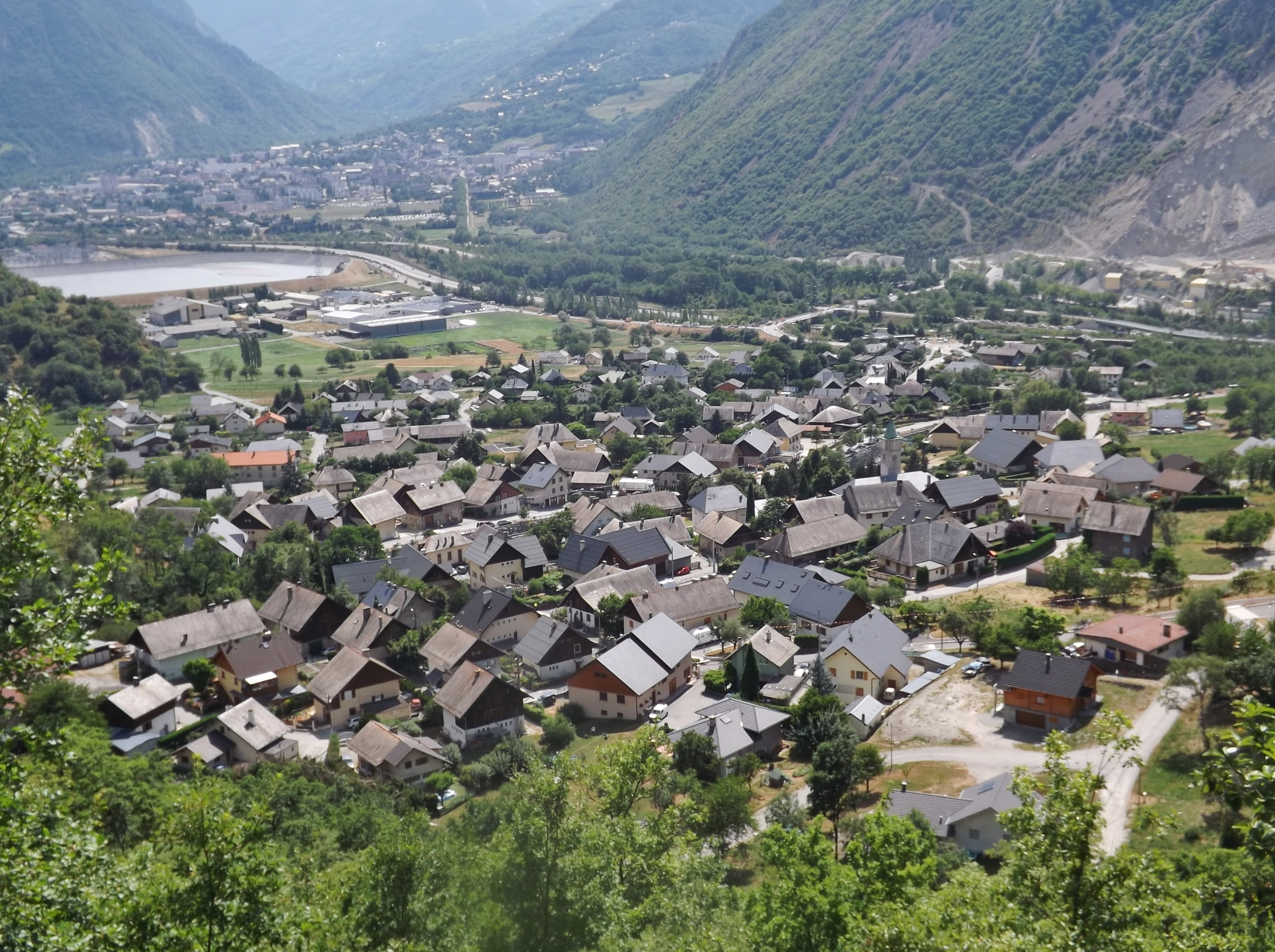
- A general view of Hermillon, with Saint-Jean-de-Maurienne visible in the background
- Location of La Tour-en-Maurienne
- Location within France Location within Auvergne-Rhône-Alpes
- Coordinates: 45°17′57″N 6°21′47″E
- Country: France
- Region: Auvergne-Rhône-Alpes
- Department: Savoie
- Arrondissement: Saint-Jean-de-Maurienne
- Canton: Saint-Jean-de-Maurienne
- Intercommunality: Cœur de Maurienne Arvan

Government
  - Mayor (2020–2026): Yves Durbet
- Area^{1}: 40.96 km^{2} (15.81 sq mi)
- Highest elevation: 2,768 m (9,081 ft)
- Lowest elevation: 464 m (1,522 ft)
- Population (2023): 1,087
  - Density: 26.54/km^{2} (68.73/sq mi)
- Time zone: UTC+01:00 (CET)
  - Summer (DST): UTC+02:00 (CEST)
- INSEE/Postal code: 73135 /73300
- ^{1} French Land Register data, which excludes lakes, ponds, glaciers > 1 km^{2} (0.386 sq mi or 247 acres) and river estuaries.

La Tour-en-Maurienne (French pronunciation: [la tuʁ ɑ̃ mɔʁjɛn], lit. 'La Tour in Maurienne') is a commune in the Savoie department in the Auvergne-Rhône-Alpes region in south-eastern France. It was established on 1 January 2019 by merger of the former communes of Hermillon (the seat), Le Châtel and Pontamafrey-Montpascal.

== See also ==
- Communes of the Savoie department
