= Hubert Déquier =

French poet and writer

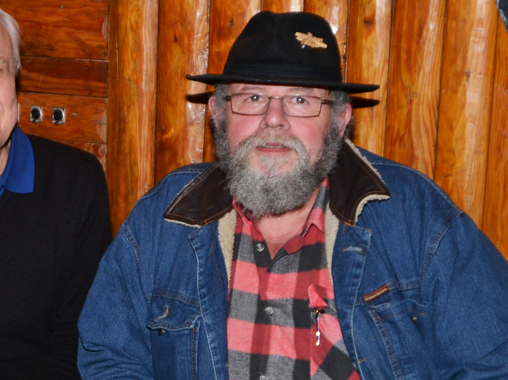
- Born: Hubert Pierre Déquier; 6 November 1952 (age 73); Saint-Jean-de-Maurienne, France
- Writing career
- Pen name: Ƕ (symbol)
- Language: French
- Notable work: The revolt of a mountain dweller

Hubert Pierre Déquier (born Saint-Jean-de-Maurienne, 6 November 1952) is a French poet and writer, best known as the author of the collection of poems La revolte d'un Montagnard ("The revolt of a mountain dweller") in 2011 . The book won the Epic Poetry Prize - Literary festival Hermillon, 2011. Since 2008, he has been a member of the Académie de Maurienne.

== Bibliography ==
Title	Year	Type	Pages	Notes
La revolte d'un Montagnard	2011	Poetry	??	Epic Poetry Prize - Literary festival Hermillon, 2011
