= Saint-Jean-de-Maurienne =

Subprefecture of Savoie, Auvergne-Rhône-Alpes, France

Saint-Jean-de-Maurienne Sent-Jian-de-Môrièna (Arpitan) San Giovanni di Moriana (Italian)
- Subprefecture and commune
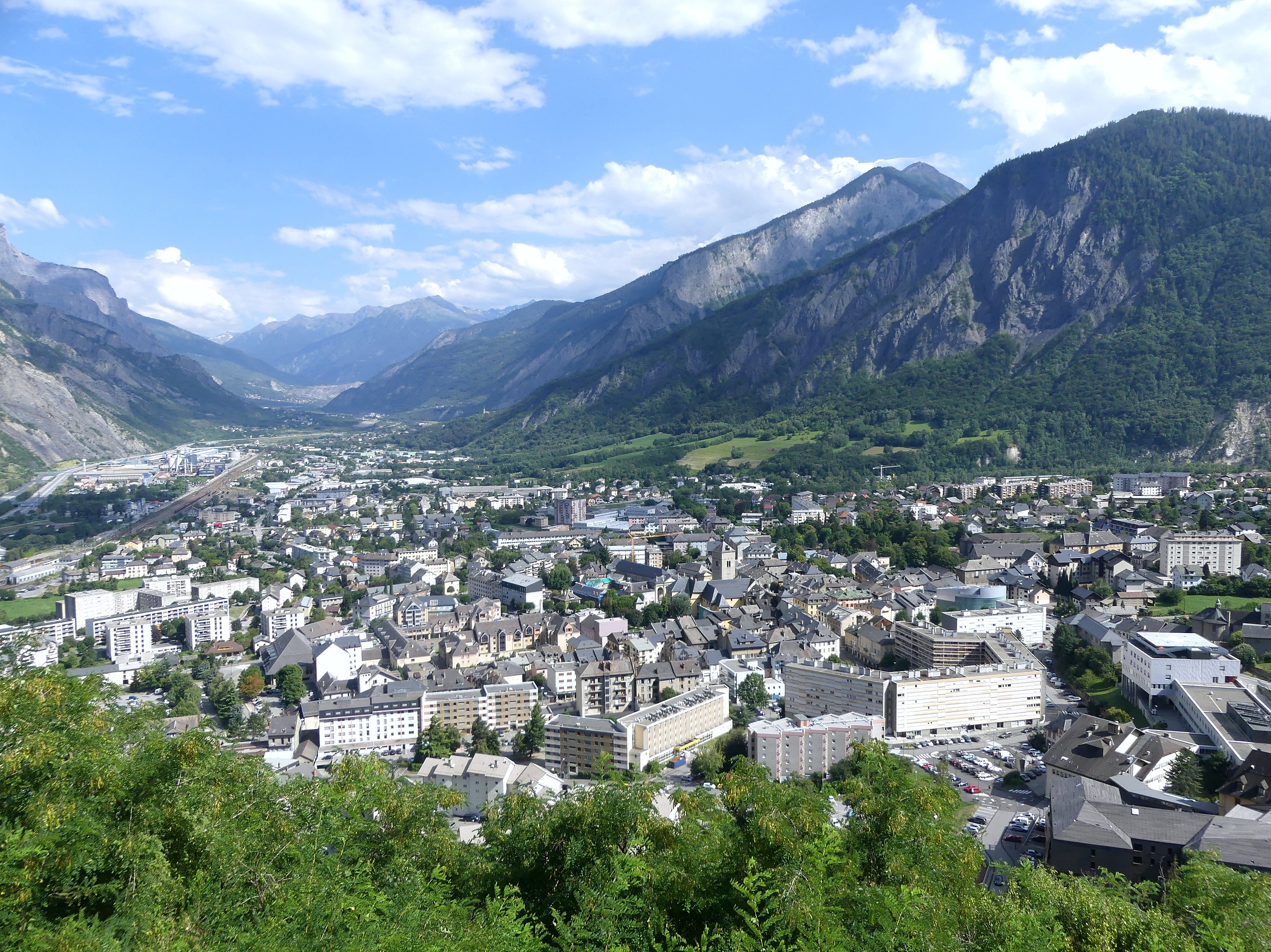
- A view of Saint-Jean-de-Maurienne in the direction of Modane

- Coat of arms
- Location of Saint-Jean-de-Maurienne
- Location within France Location within Auvergne-Rhône-Alpes
- Coordinates: 45°16′22″N 6°20′54″E
- Country: France
- Region: Auvergne-Rhône-Alpes
- Department: Savoie
- Arrondissement: Saint-Jean-de-Maurienne
- Canton: Saint-Jean-de-Maurienne
- Intercommunality: Cœur de Maurienne Arvan

Government
  - Mayor (2020–2026): Philippe Rollet
- Area^{1}: 11.51 km^{2} (4.44 sq mi)
- Elevation: 566 m (1,857 ft)
- Highest elevation: 1,200 m (3,900 ft)
- Lowest elevation: 489 m (1,604 ft)
- Population (2023): 7,524
  - Density: 653.7/km^{2} (1,693/sq mi)
- Time zone: UTC+01:00 (CET)
  - Summer (DST): UTC+02:00 (CEST)
- INSEE/Postal code: 73248 /73300
- Website: saintjeandemaurienne.fr
- ^{1} French Land Register data, which excludes lakes, ponds, glaciers > 1 km^{2} (0.386 sq mi or 247 acres) and river estuaries.

Saint-Jean-de-Maurienne (French pronunciation: [sɛ̃ ʒɑ̃ də mɔʁjɛn]; Arpitan: Sent-Jian-de-Môrièna or Sant-Jian-de-Môrièna; Italian: San Giovanni di Moriana) is a subprefecture of the Savoie department, in the region of Auvergne-Rhône-Alpes (formerly Rhône-Alpes), in southeastern France.

It lies in the Maurienne, the valley of the river Arc. It was also an Episcopal See of Savoy during the Ancien Régime and again from 1825 to 1966. Its original name was simply Maurienne, or Moriana in Italian and Latin.

== Geography ==
=== Location ===
Saint-Jean-de-Maurienne is located at the confluence of the Arc, a river which has shaped the Maurienne Valley, and the Arvan which descends the Arves Valley (Col de la Croix de Fer).

The neighbouring communes of Saint-Jean-de-Maurienne are Saint-Julien-Mont-Denis, Jarrier, Hermillon, Villargondran, Albiez-le-Jeune, Albiez-Montrond, Saint-Pancrace and Pontamafrey-Montpascal.

Saint-Jean-de-Maurienne is close to Albertville (59 km), Chambery (72 km), Grenoble (103 km), Turin (137 km) and Lyon (174 km).

=== Climate ===
The climate is the alpine type because of the presence of the Alpine Massif.

City	Sunshine	Rain	Snow	Storm	Fog
Paris	1797 hrs/yr	642 mm (25.3 in)/yr	15 days/yr	19 days/yr	13 days/yr
Nice	2694 hrs/yr	767 mm (30.2 in)/yr	1 day/yr	31 days/yr	1 day/yr
Strasbourg	1637 hrs/yr	610 mm (24 in)/yr	30 days/yr	29 days/yr	65 days/yr
Saint-Jean-de-Maurienne	1970 hrs/yr	960 mm (38 in)/yr	... days/yr	... days/yr	... days/yr
National average	1973 hrs/yr	770 mm (30 in)/yr	14 days/yr	22 days/yr	40 days/yr

Climate data for Saint-Jean-de-Maurienne (1991−2020 normals, extremes 1983−2020)
Month	Jan	Feb	Mar	Apr	May	Jun	Jul	Aug	Sep	Oct	Nov	Dec	Year
Record high °C (°F)	19.1 (66.4)	22.2 (72.0)	25.8 (78.4)	30.0 (86.0)	33.2 (91.8)	37.0 (98.6)	39.5 (103.1)	39.0 (102.2)	32.1 (89.8)	29.9 (85.8)	23.9 (75.0)	21.1 (70.0)	39.5 (103.1)
Mean daily maximum °C (°F)	5.9 (42.6)	8.2 (46.8)	13.8 (56.8)	17.7 (63.9)	21.4 (70.5)	25.0 (77.0)	27.4 (81.3)	27.0 (80.6)	22.1 (71.8)	16.9 (62.4)	10.4 (50.7)	6.1 (43.0)	16.8 (62.2)
Daily mean °C (°F)	2.0 (35.6)	3.6 (38.5)	8.2 (46.8)	11.7 (53.1)	15.4 (59.7)	19.0 (66.2)	21.1 (70.0)	20.7 (69.3)	16.5 (61.7)	11.9 (53.4)	6.3 (43.3)	2.5 (36.5)	11.6 (52.9)
Mean daily minimum °C (°F)	−1.9 (28.6)	−1.1 (30.0)	2.5 (36.5)	5.7 (42.3)	9.5 (49.1)	12.9 (55.2)	14.8 (58.6)	14.5 (58.1)	10.9 (51.6)	7.0 (44.6)	2.2 (36.0)	−1.1 (30.0)	6.3 (43.3)
Record low °C (°F)	−18.2 (−0.8)	−14.4 (6.1)	−10.0 (14.0)	−4.7 (23.5)	−0.2 (31.6)	1.2 (34.2)	6.0 (42.8)	3.7 (38.7)	1.0 (33.8)	−3.9 (25.0)	−9.3 (15.3)	−13.2 (8.2)	−18.2 (−0.8)
Average precipitation mm (inches)	91.1 (3.59)	66.4 (2.61)	70.3 (2.77)	61.0 (2.40)	81.0 (3.19)	69.7 (2.74)	67.5 (2.66)	75.1 (2.96)	62.9 (2.48)	76.8 (3.02)	87.6 (3.45)	101.5 (4.00)	910.9 (35.86)
Average precipitation days (≥ 1.0 mm)	8.9	8.0	8.4	9.0	11.8	10.8	9.1	9.4	8.3	9.8	9.7	9.9	113.1
Source: Météo-France

=== Lines of communication and transport ===
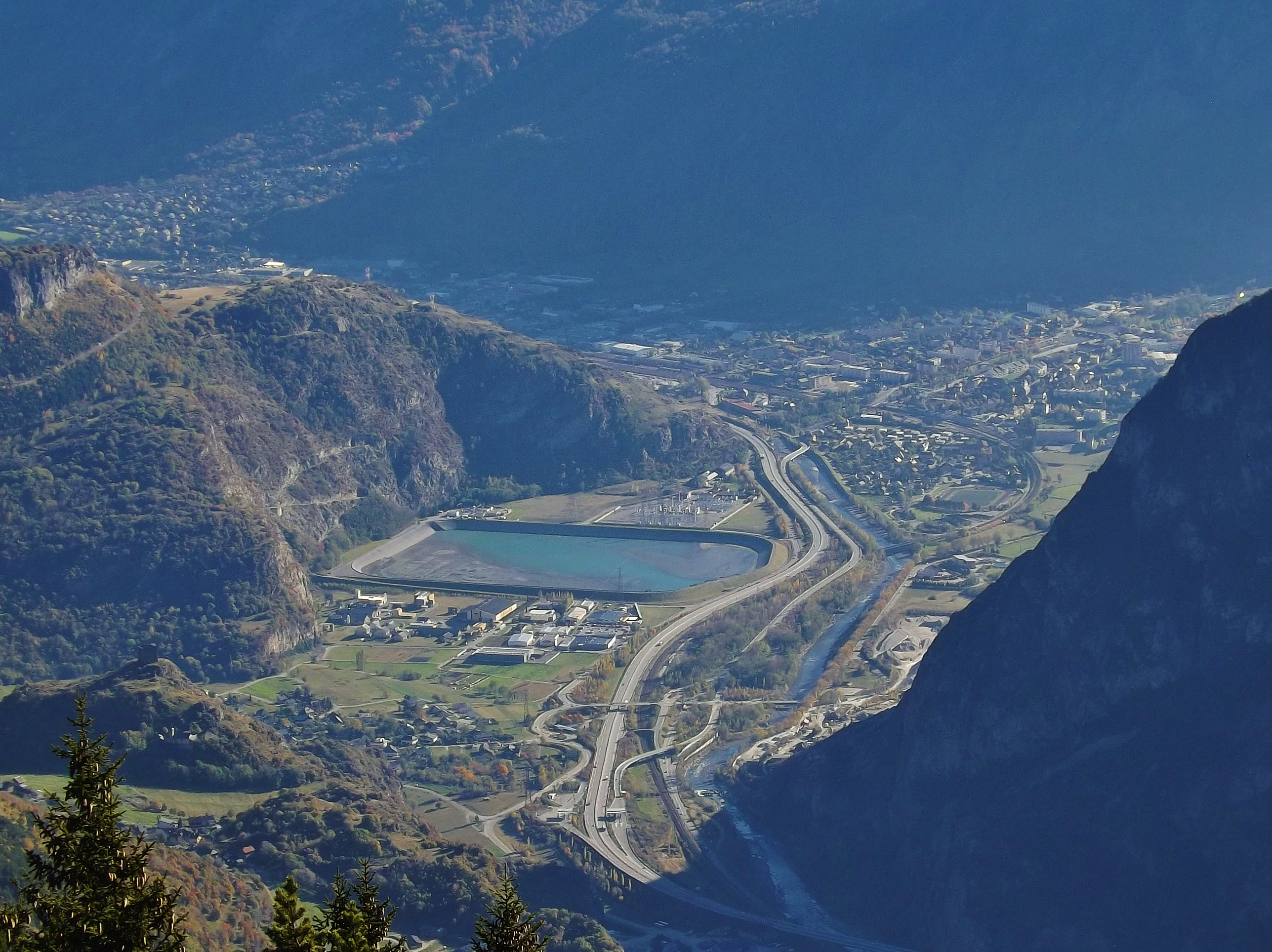
The Maurienne Valley and its main channels of communication to Saint-Jean-de-Maurienne

==== Roads ====
- Route nationale 6 (RN 6)
- A43 autoroute
- Col de la Croix de Fer

==== Railway ====
Saint-Jean-de-Maurienne is on the route of the future Lyon-Turin rail link. Homes, businesses, the current railway station and the rescue centre are affected by the project. The Lyon Turin Railway company (LTF) which manages the construction projects plans to build new railway station in the Sous-le-Bourg neighborhood, serving both the historic line and the new Lyon-Turin line. Geological and topographical investigations are underway. The project promises to be even more complex than that of the Channel Tunnel.

==== Public transport ====
The town of Saint-Jean-de-Maurienne is equipped with a network of public transport run by the Communauté de communes Cœur de Maurienne.

==== Air ====
A heliport is available for the helicopter of the gendarmerie whose base is located in Modane.

== Urbanism ==
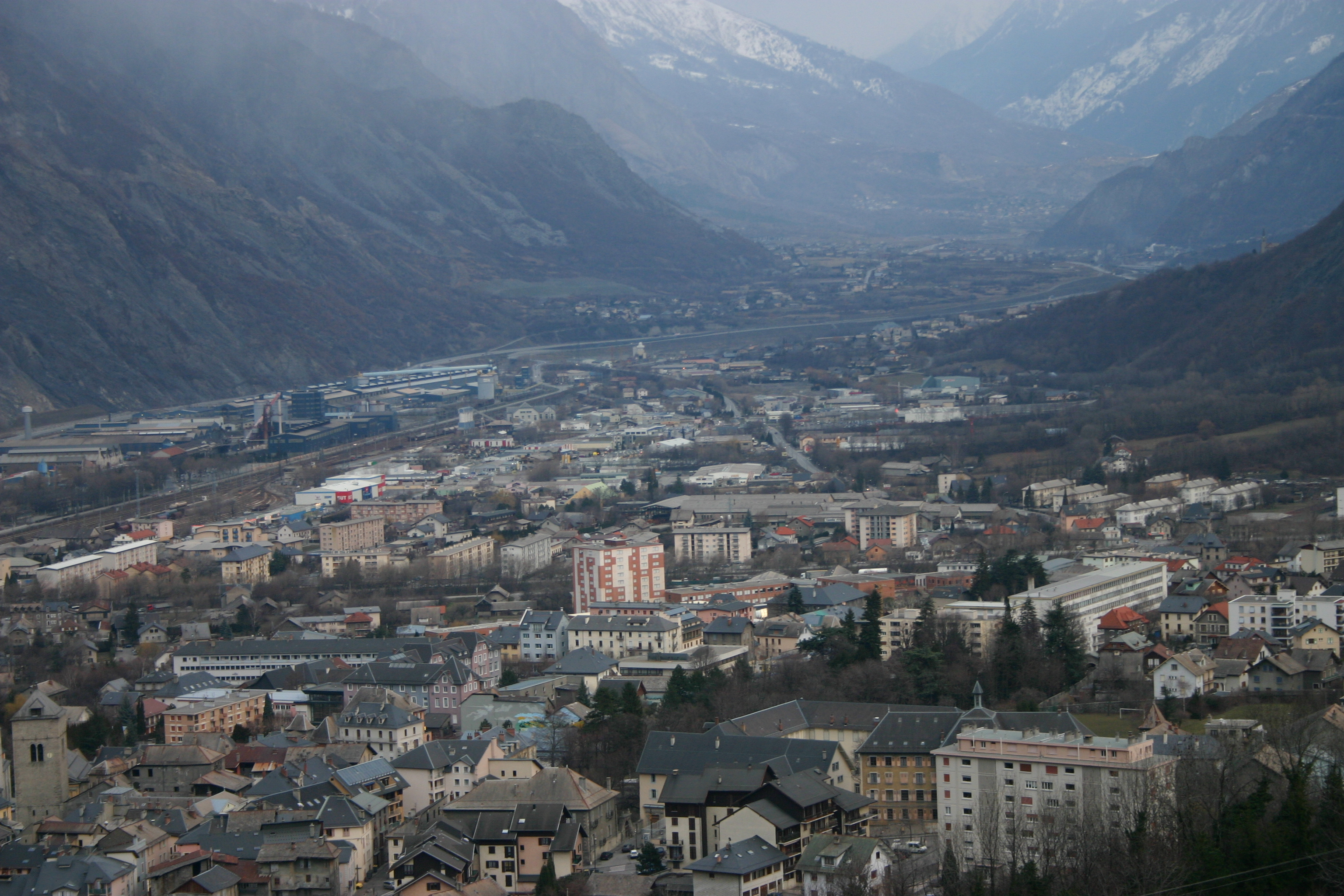
General view of Saint-Jean-de-Maurienne

=== Urban morphology ===
La Bastille, Les Chaudannes and Les Clapeys are the three main quarters.

=== Housing ===
The total number of dwellings in the commune is 4,240. Among such housing, 87.9% are principal residences, 5.4% are secondary homes and 6.7% are vacant dwellings. These accommodations have a share of 17.5% as individual houses, 79.3% as apartments and finally only 3.2% as dwellings of another type. The number of residents who own their homes is 37.9%. This is lower than the national average which adds up to nearly 55.3%. The number of tenants is 56.7% throughout the housing which is higher than the national average of 39.8%. It may be noted also that 5.4% of the inhabitants of the commune are people who are housed for free while at the level of the whole of the France the percentage is 4.9%. Still on all of the municipality housing, 3.5% are studios, 11.5% are two-room housing, 28.4% have three, 34.5% of dwellings have four rooms, and 22.1% of dwellings have five rooms or more.

== Toponymy ==
The locality named is after John the Baptist, the precursor, son of Zechariah and Saint Elizabeth, cousin of Jesus, beheaded in 31 AD at the request of the Princess Salome.

The Latin name is Mauriana.

== History ==
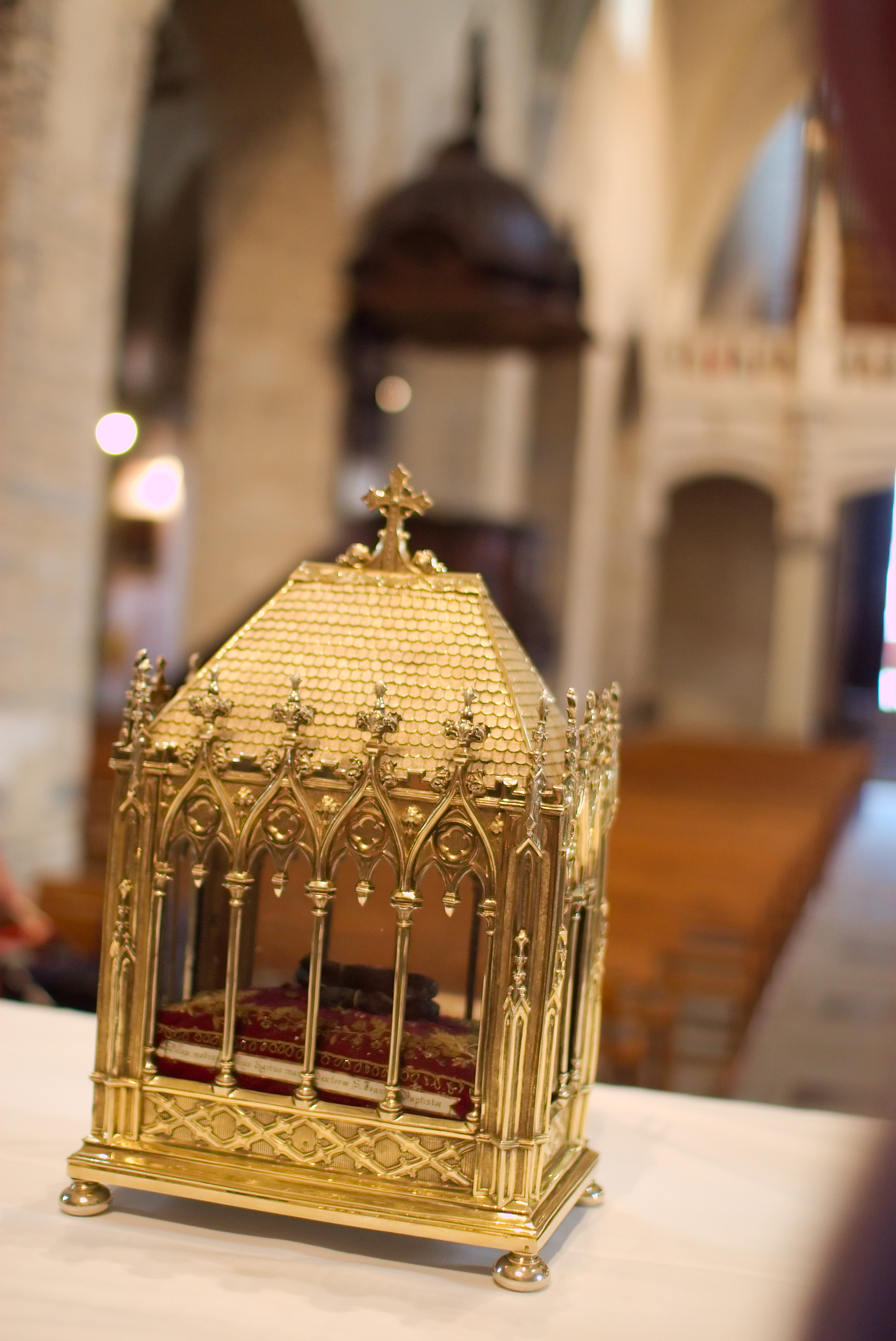
Relics of Saint John the Baptist during the festival of bread.

Saint-Jean-de-Maurienne has been the capital of the Maurienne Valley since the 6th century. After Saint Thècle reported from Alexandria (Egypt) the relics of St. John the Baptist, which are the three fingers represented on the arms of the city, as well as on the Opinel knife blades, the town was raised to the rank of diocese by Guntram, grandson of Clovis I.

In 753, Grifo went to Italy to join the King of the Lombards, Aistulf, the most powerful opponent of his half-brother, the King of the Franks, Pepin the Short, but he was killed at Saint-Jean-de-Maurienne by the men of Pepin.

The oldest possessions of the Counts of Savoy were the counties of Maurienne, Savoy proper (the district between Arc, Isère, and the middle course of the Rhone), and Belley, with Bugey as its chief town.

The Duchy of Savoy, which had been a French-speaking province under the sovereignty of the Kingdom of Sardinia-Piedmont, was invaded by Revolutionary France, but restored to Piedmont in 1815. It became part of France in 1859, after the Second Italian War of Independence.

The Aix-les-Bains—Saint-Jean-de-Maurienne railway opened in 1857.

In the early 1900s, the technological advances of Swiss hydroelectric power were originally the subject of intense stock market speculation on hydroelectric companies, which benefitted the Maurienne Valley with industrial facilities, and tourism took off.

== Politics and administration ==
The city of Saint-Jean-de-Maurienne is a sub-prefecture of Savoie. It is the seat of the arrondissement of Saint-Jean-de-Maurienne, the canton of Saint-Jean-de-Maurienne and the Communauté de communes Cœur de Maurienne Arvan.

The city of Saint-Jean-de-Maurienne is part of Savoie's 3rd constituency.

=== Political trends and outcomes ===
Traditionally, Saint-Jean-de-Maurienne has been a stronghold of the Socialist left from the 1930s because of the importance of its worker labor pool. Thus, Roland Merloz was the Socialist mayor from 1977 to 2008. But since the 1990s and sociological changes in the Maurienne (departure of factories, multiplication of tourist resorts, decrease of the population with an increase in representation of the elderly), the right-wing vote has increased. A UMP Councillor General, Pierre-Marie Charvoz, was elected in 2001, Nicolas Sarkozy was in the lead in the two rounds of the presidential elections of 2007, with respectively 33.5% and 56.62%, and in 2008, Pierre-Marie Charvoz won the communal elections.

=== Municipal government ===
The city council of Saint-Jean-de-Maurienne has 29 members. It is composed of a mayor, seven assistants, four delegate councillors and seventeen councillors.

Roland Merloz, mayor of the city since 1977, announced his desire not to stand in 2008.

The following is the share of seats in the municipal council of Saint Jean de Maurienne:

Party	Main candidate	Seats	Status
UMP	Pierre-Marie Charvoz	23	Majority
Union of the Left	Hervé Bottino	6	Opposition

In the municipal elections of March 2008, turnout of the first round was 65.46% with a total of 5,310 people registered to vote in the commune. The number of voters amounted to 3,476 voters which 3,393 expressed themselves. In the first round, the presidential majority list of Ensemble pour Saint Jean [Together for Sain Jean] with its head, Pierre-Marie Charvoz collected 46.95% of the vote or 1,593 votes. Followed by the list of "Saint Jean 10,000" led by Hervé Bottino, having received 34.39% of the vote or 1,169 votes. In third position, Saint Jean à venir [Saint Jean to come] list, headed by Christine Merlin got 13.26% of the votes or 450 votes. Finally the list Vivons Saint Jean [Live Saint Jean], led by Florence Arnoux Le Bras got 5.39% or 183 votes.

In the second round, the turnout was 68.57%. The number of voters amounted to 3,642 voters with 3,509 expressing themselves. In the second round, the presidential majority list of Ensemble pour Saint Jean with its head, Pierre-Marie Charvoz collected 55.40% of the vote or 1,944 votes and won 23 seats. The list of "Saint Jean 10 000" conducted by Hervé Bottino, received 44.60% of the vote or 1,565 votes and was therefore awarded 6 seats. The other lists were not present in the second round.

=== List of mayors ===
List of mayors of Saint-Jean-de-Maurienne
Start	End	Name	Party	Other details
1860	1862	Cyrille Richard	...	Mayor
1862	1865	Antoine Mottard	...	Mayor
1865	1870	Cyrille Richard	...	Mayor
1870	1870	Alexis Magnin	...	Provisional mayor
1870	1874	Maurice Petit	...	Mayor
1874	1876	Cyrille Richard	...	Mayor
1876	1881	Ignace Deleglise	...	Mayor
1881	1904	Florimond Truchet	...	Mayor
1904	1911	Joseph Vuillermet	...	Mayor
1911	1912	Charles Bonnivard	...	Mayor
1912	1935	Henri Falcoz	...	Mayor, député
1935	1938	Alphonse Thibieroz	...	Mayor
1938	1943	Jean-Pierre Bouttaz	...	Mayor
1943	1944	Guido Fodéré	...	Mayor
1944	1945	Georges Beaufils	...	Mayor
1945	1953	Florimond Girard	UNR	Conseiller général, député
1953	1971	Samuel Pasquier	UNR	Mayor
1971	1977	Charles Gubian	UNR	Mayor
1977	2008	Roland Merloz	PS	Conseiller général
2008	2020	Pierre-Marie Charvoz	UMP then UDI	Mayor/Conseiller général
2020	In progress	Philippe Rollet	...	Mayor

== Twin towns – sister cities ==
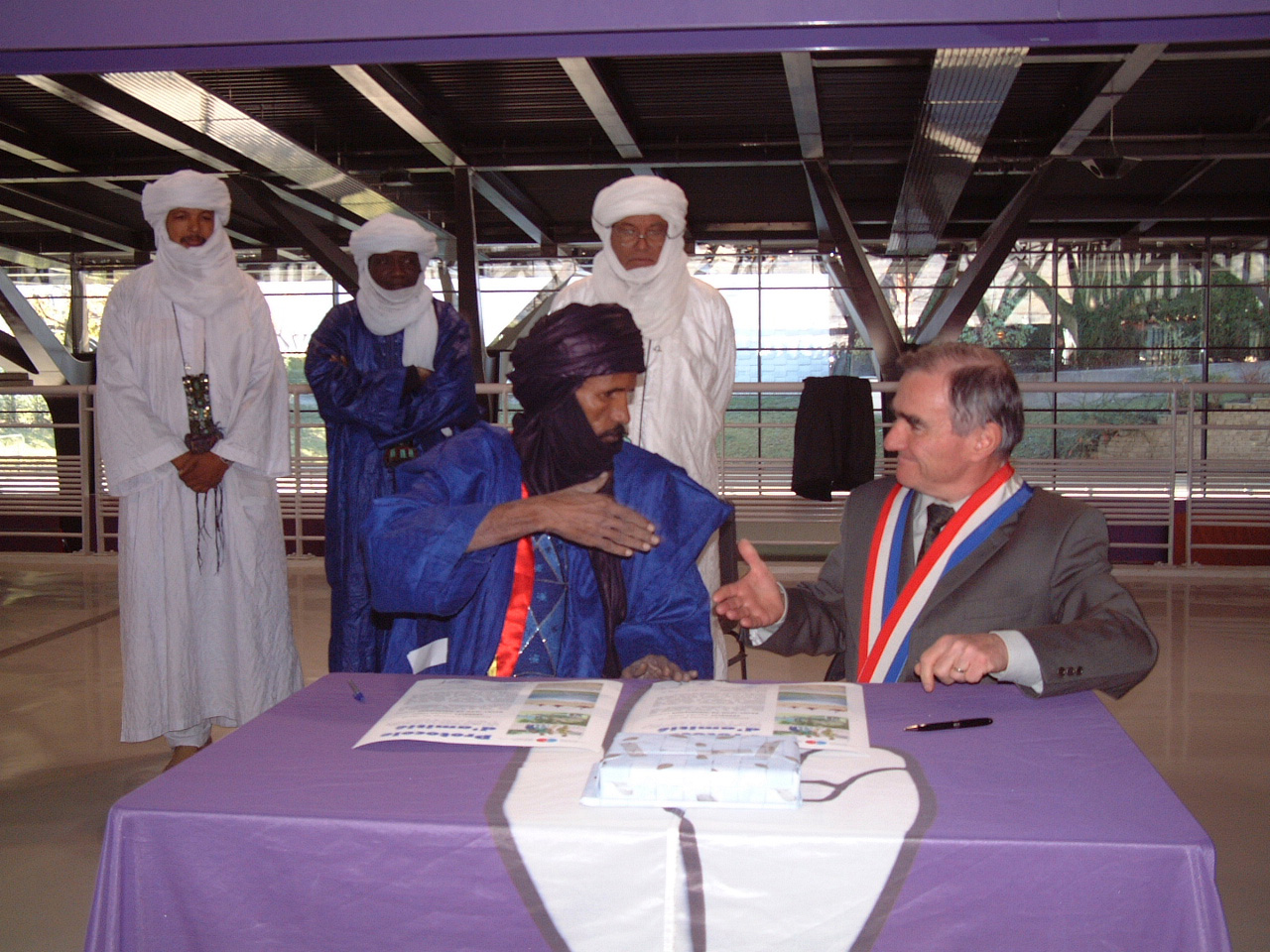
The signature of the memorandum of friendship with Tessalit in Mali, on 19 November 2005

Saint-Jean-de-Maurienne is twinned with:

- Bad Wildungen, Germany, since 1981
- Giaveno, Italy, since 2013

== Population and society ==
=== Demography ===
Historical population

Year	Pop.	±% p.a.
1793	2,005	—
1800	2,240	+1.60%
1806	2,371	+0.95%
1822	2,550	+0.46%
1838	3,084	+1.20%
1848	2,837	−0.83%
1858	3,471	+2.04%
1861	3,254	−2.13%
1866	3,088	−1.04%
1872	3,121	+0.18%
1876	3,087	−0.27%
1881	2,987	−0.66%

Year	Pop.	±% p.a.
1886	3,068	+0.54%
1891	3,114	+0.30%
1896	3,278	+1.03%
1901	3,081	−1.23%
1906	3,110	+0.19%
1911	3,327	+1.36%
1921	3,794	+1.32%
1926	4,156	+1.84%
1931	4,456	+1.40%
1936	5,201	+3.14%
1946	5,886	+1.24%
1954	6,676	+1.59%

Year	Pop.	±% p.a.
1962	7,404	+1.30%
1968	8,685	+2.70%
1975	9,746	+1.66%
1982	9,639	−0.16%
1990	9,439	−0.26%
1999	8,902	−0.65%
2007	8,633	−0.38%
2012	8,067	−1.35%
2017	7,746	−0.81%
2023	7,524	−0.48%

From 1962 to 1999: Population without double counting; for the years following: municipal population.
Source: EHESS and INSEE

The total number of households in Saint-Jean-de-Maurienne is 3,729. These households are not all equal in numbers of individuals. Some of these households contain one, others two, three, four, five or even more than six people. Here, below, is the data as a percentage of the distribution of these households, compared to the total number of households.

Households
Households of:	1 person	2 people	3 people	4 people	5 people	6+ people
Saint-Jean-de-Maurienne	32.9%	31.8%	16.8%	13.4%	3.5%	1.6%
National average	31%	31.1%	16.2%	13.8%	5.5%	2.4%
Data sources: INSEE

=== Teaching ===
Kindergartens:

- Aristide-Briand kindergarten (public)
- Des Clapeys kindergarten (public)
- Des Chaudannes kindergarten(public)
- Saint-Joseph kindergarten(private) - Closed in 2015

Primary schools:

- Aristide-Briand primary school (public)
- Des Clapeys primary school (public)
- Des Chaudannes primary school (public)
- Saint-Joseph Primary school (private) - Closed in 2015

Collèges:

- Public college: Maurienne collège
- Private college: Saint-Joseph collège - Closed in 2015

High schools:

- Paul Héroult general and technology lycée
- Paul Héroult professional lycée

=== Cultural events and festivities ===
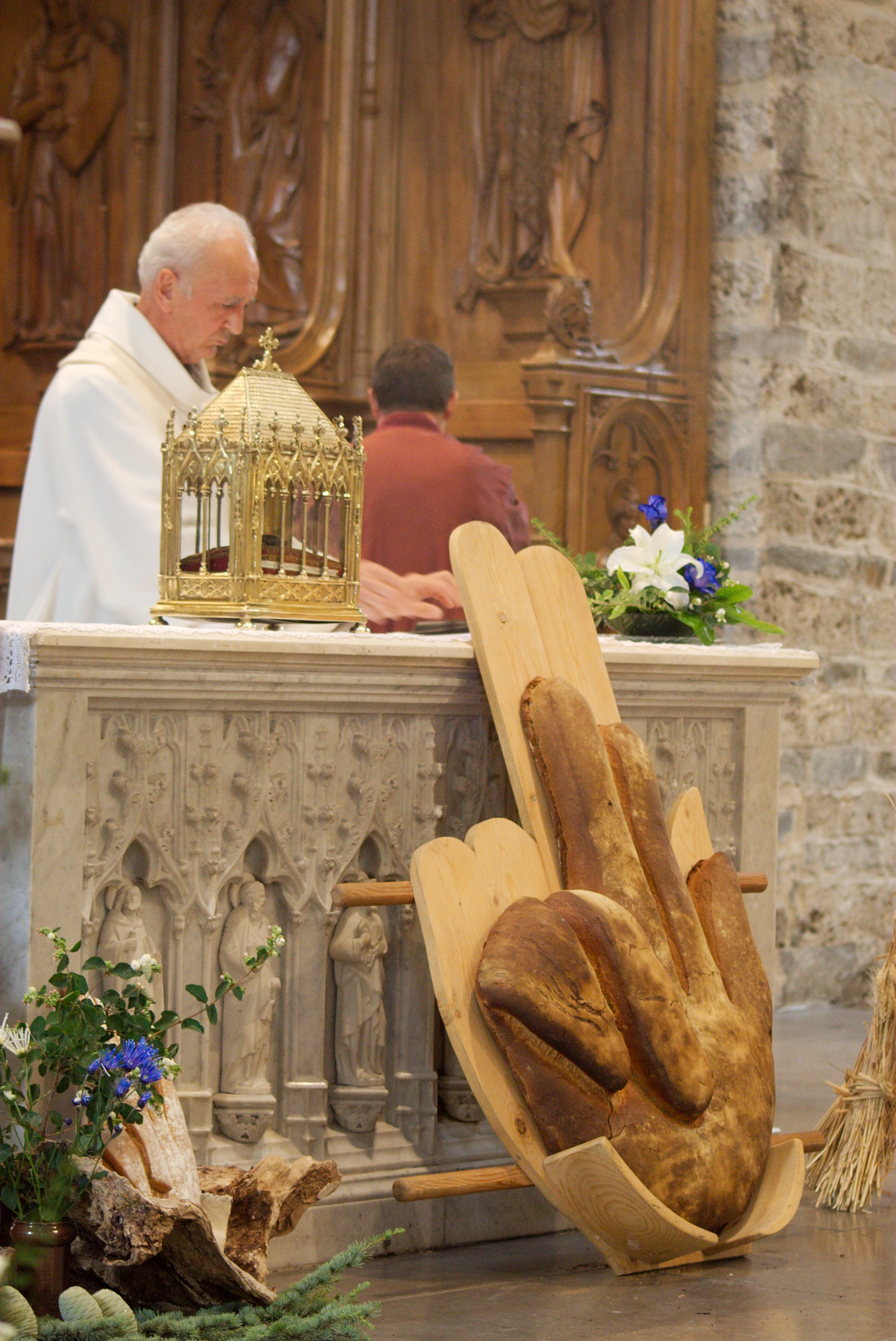
Relics of St. John the Baptist at the festival of bread.

- In 2006, starting the stage of cycling's Tour de France to Morzine. The stage winner was Floyd Landis, after a 200.5 kilometres (124.6 mi) stage.
- Festival of music, Saturday, 20 June 2009
- Festival of Saint Jean, Saturday 27 and Sunday 28 June 2009
- An outdoor cinema every Tuesday and entertainment every Thursday in July and August
- Passage of multiple cycle races throughout the summer (Classique des Alpes junior, Tour des Pays de Savoie, Critérium du Dauphiné, Tour de France)
- Festival of bread, Thursday, 6 August 2009
- 10km de Saint-Jean in October
- Various entertainments throughout the year (theatre, concerts, etc.)
- Salon des vins et saveurs, during the 3rd weekend in November, organized by the association verres et verines du cœur

=== Sports ===
Saint-Jean-de-Maurienne is located close to some of the major Alpine passes, and of the Les Sybelles ski area and the Vanoise National Park. Activities are available for nature and sports enthusiasts, both hikers and cyclists, as well as skiers. Saint-Jean-de-Maurienne provides access to the Croix-de-Fer, the Télégraphe, the Lautaret, the Grand Cucheron, the Madeleine, the Glandon, the Iseran, Mont Cenis and the Galibier mountain passes. The city regularly hosts major cycling races such as the Tour de France or the Critérium du Dauphiné. The Tour de France came to the commune during the 2006, 2010, and 2012 races. The 2015 Tour de France had a stage finish in the commune on 23 July, at the end of stage 18. The following day, it was the departure point for stage 19. Saint-Jean-de-Maurienne was last visited for the Tour in the 2019 Tour de France.

=== Media ===
Local television:

- TV8 Mont-Blanc - La Fibre Mauriennaise
- Maurienne TV

Local radio:

- Radio Montagne FM

== Economy ==
=== Employment ===
The unemployment rate for the commune, in 1999, amounted to 8.8%, with a total number of 359 unemployed. The workforce between 20 and 59 years stood at 84%, which is higher than the national average at 82.2%. There were 46% of people employed versus 19.1% of retirees, whose number is slightly higher than the average national (18.2%). There were 21.9% of people of school age and 13% of people without activity.

Distribution of employment by industry
	Agriculture	Artisans, merchants, business leaders	Executives, intellectual professions	Associate professionals	Employees	Manual workers
Saint-Jean-de-Maurienne	0%	6.9%	7.5%	20.2%	28.7%	36.8%
National average	2.4%	6.4%	12.1%	22.1%	29.9%	27.1%
Data sources: INSEE

=== Businesses in the agglomeration ===
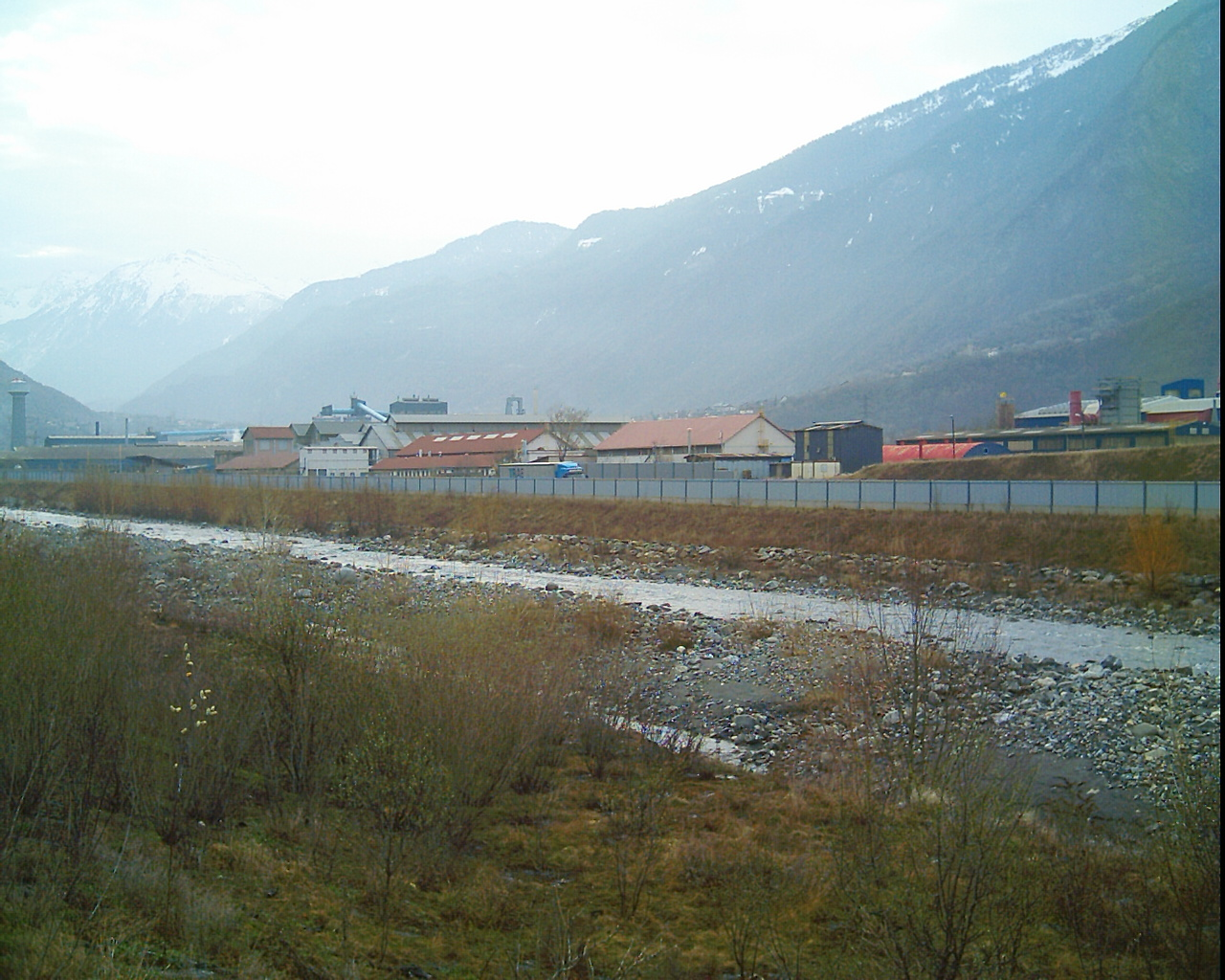
The Alcan factory, with the Arc river in the foreground

Alcan (ex-Pechiney): Currently, an important activity of production of aluminium by electrolysis of alumina still exists thanks to a Trimet France factory. The factory celebrated its 100th anniversary in 2007.

=== Commerce ===
With tourism growing through the winter sport resorts and the proximity of the major passes of the Alps and of the Vanoise National Park, local commerce is a new dynamic.

== Local culture and heritage ==
=== Places and monuments ===
==== Medieval period ====
- Le Tabellion or Correrie: House of the judge Corrier, appointed jointly by the Count of Savoy and the Bishop. Built after the revolt of Arves in 1326.
- The Rue du Collège: A medieval street, last example of shops from the 15th and 16th centuries.

==== Contemporary period ====
- The Gérard Philipe Theatre: Typical Architecture of the 1930s.

==== Religious monuments ====
- The Saint-Jean-de-Maurienne Cathedral, dedicated to Saint John the Baptist : A singular mixture of styles and periods. Its origin dates back to the 11th century. Classified as an historical monument in 1906.

- The crypt: Built in the early Romanesque period and rediscovered in 1958.
- The choir stalls in the cathedral: Completed in 1498, this masterpiece of Gothic art in walnut is attributed to Pierre Mochet.
- The cloister: located between the cathedral and the refectory of the canons, its origin dates back to 1450. Classified as an historical monument in 1933.
- The bell tower: A former capitular keep having lost its Gothic spire and its four pinnacles in 1794.

Cathedral of Saint John the Baptist

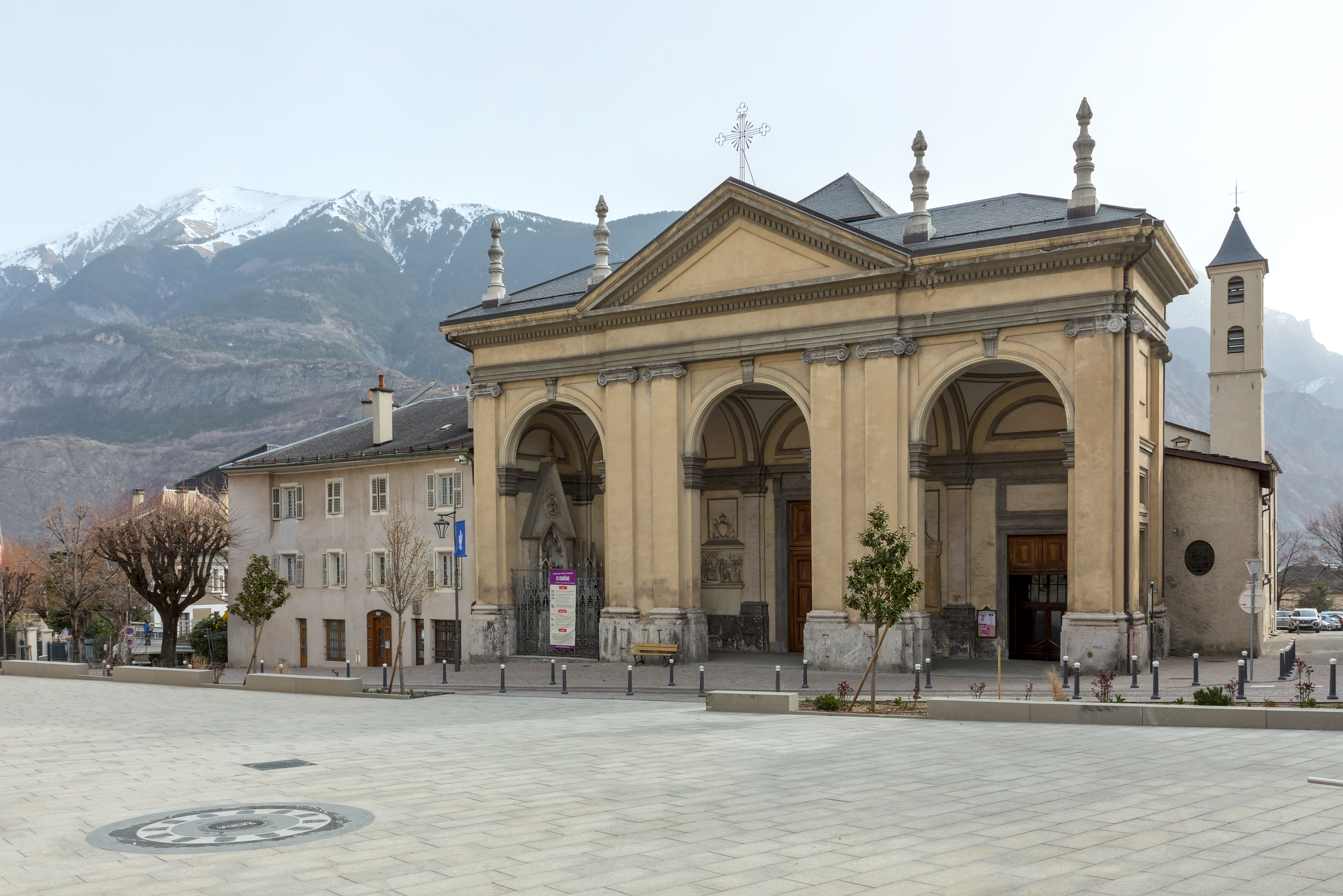
Facade, with the Alps in the background.

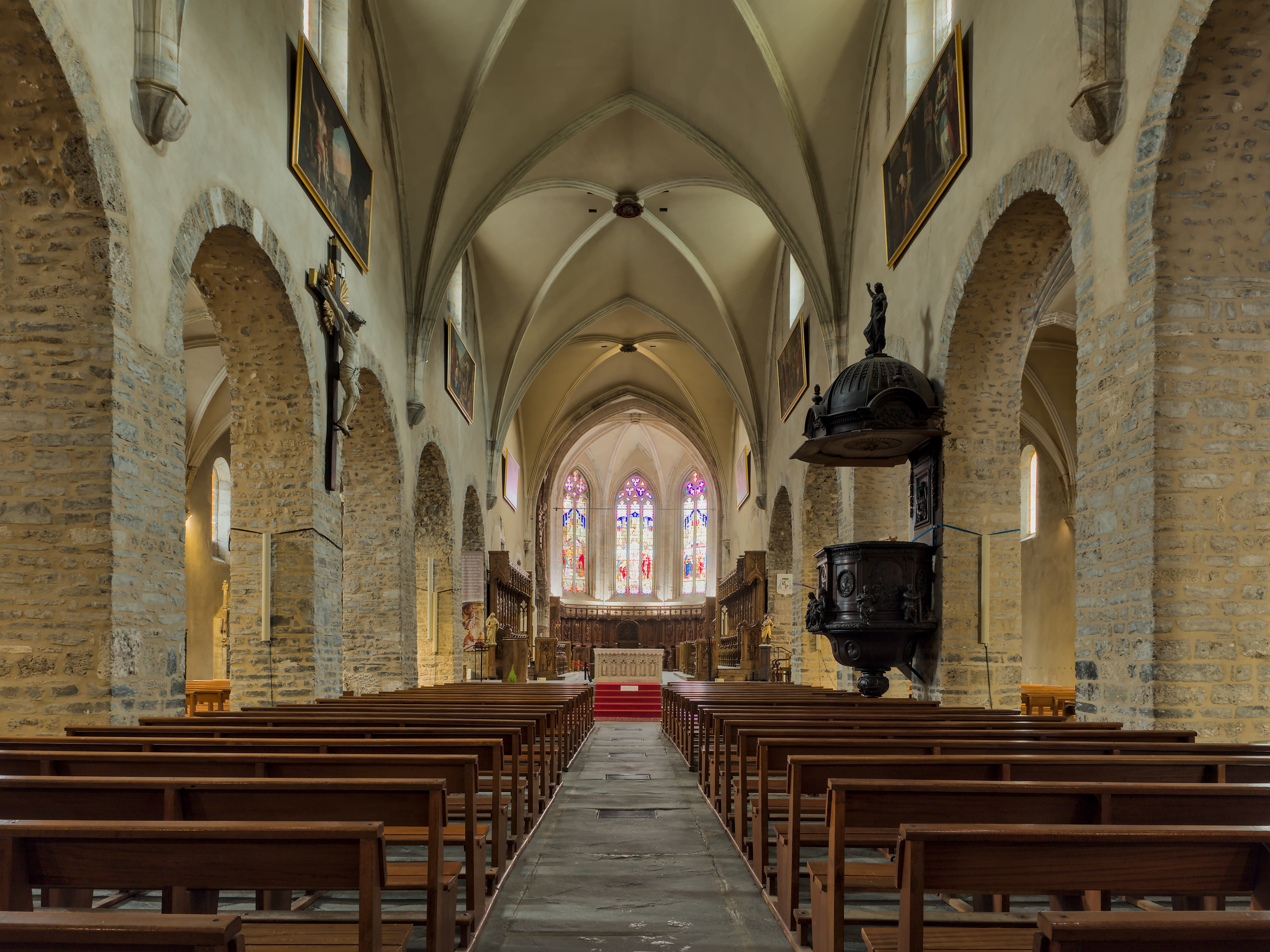
The nave.

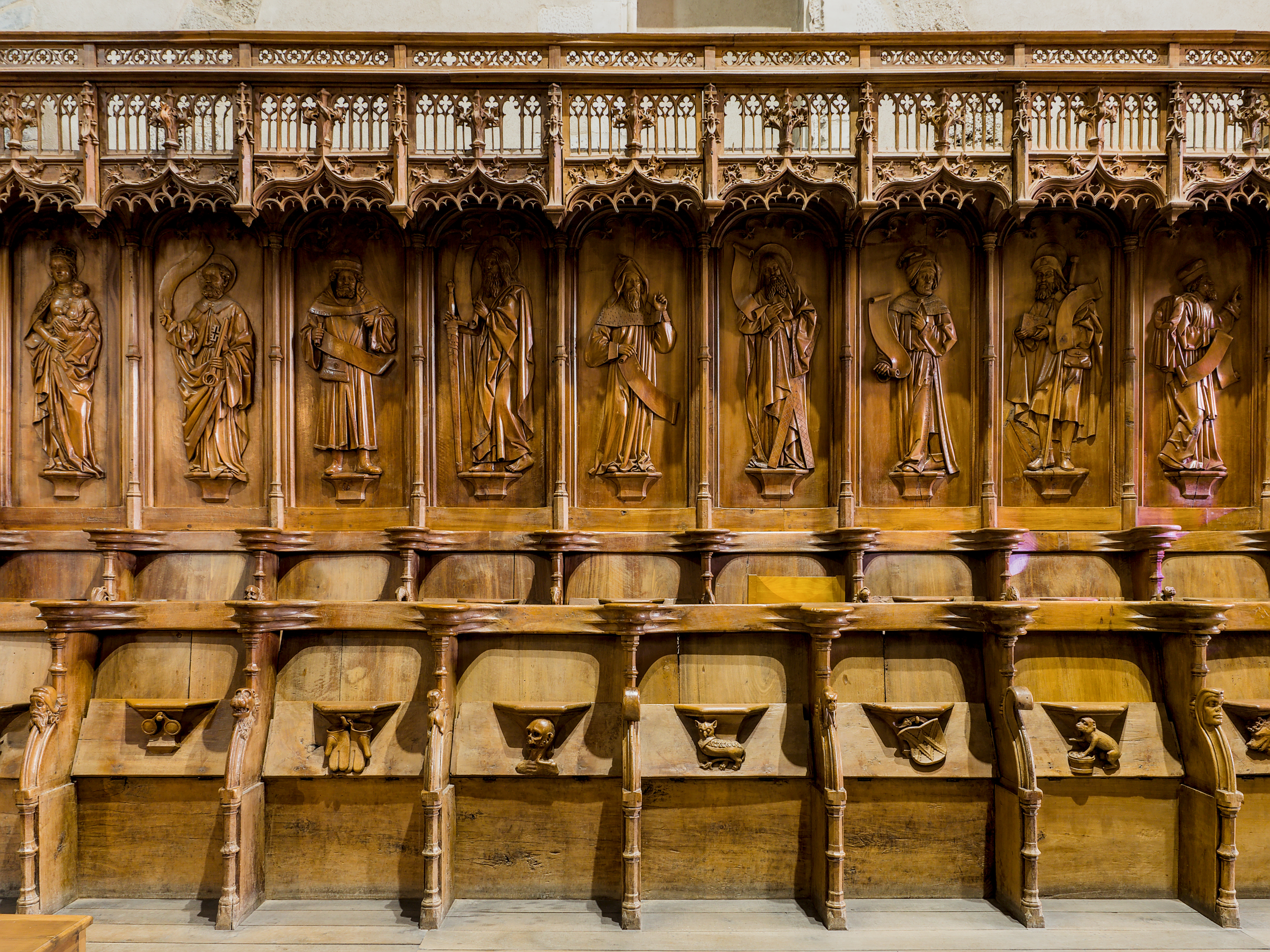
Part of the choir stalls.

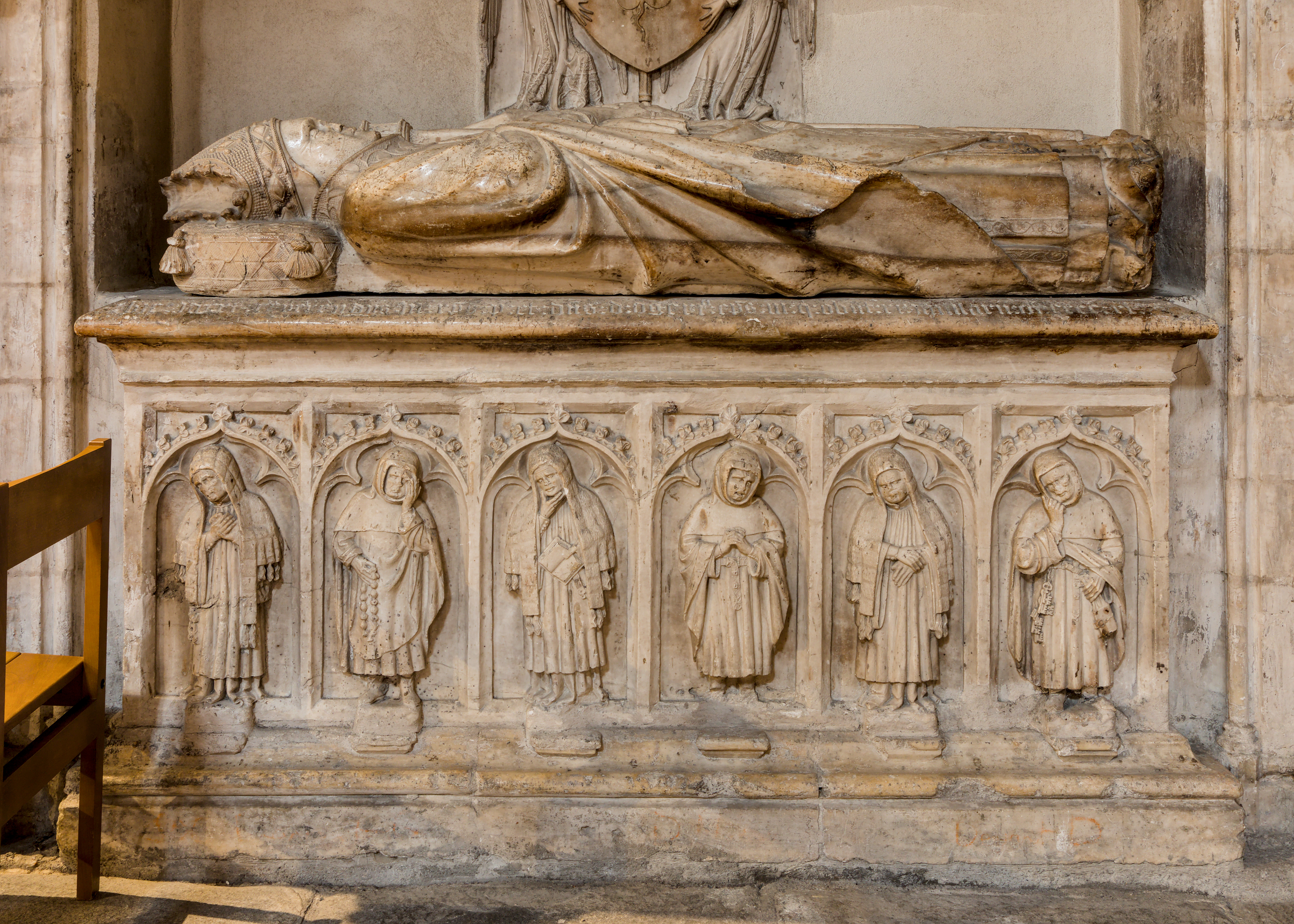
Funerary monument of Oger de Conflans.

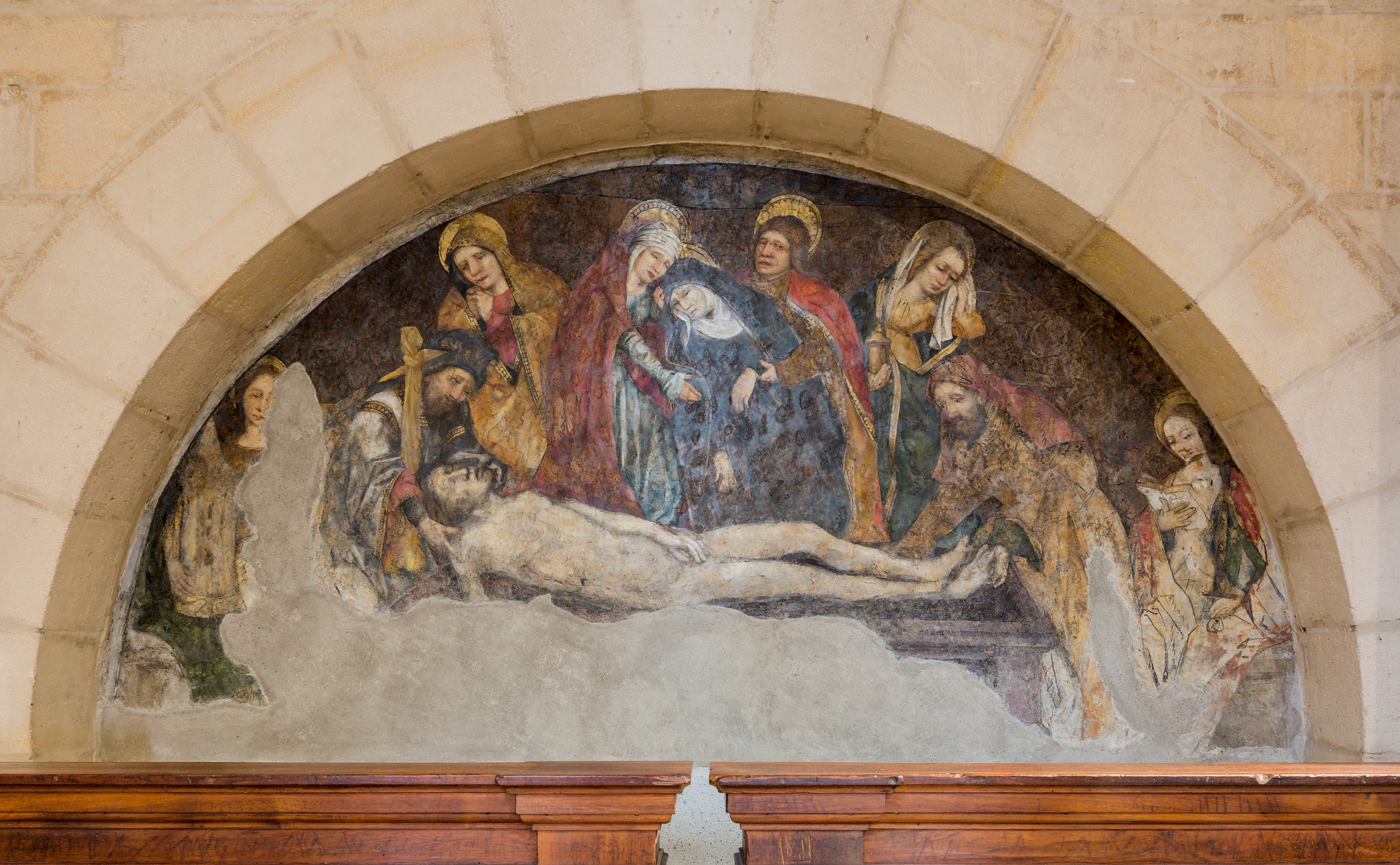
Fresco of the Entombment (15th century).

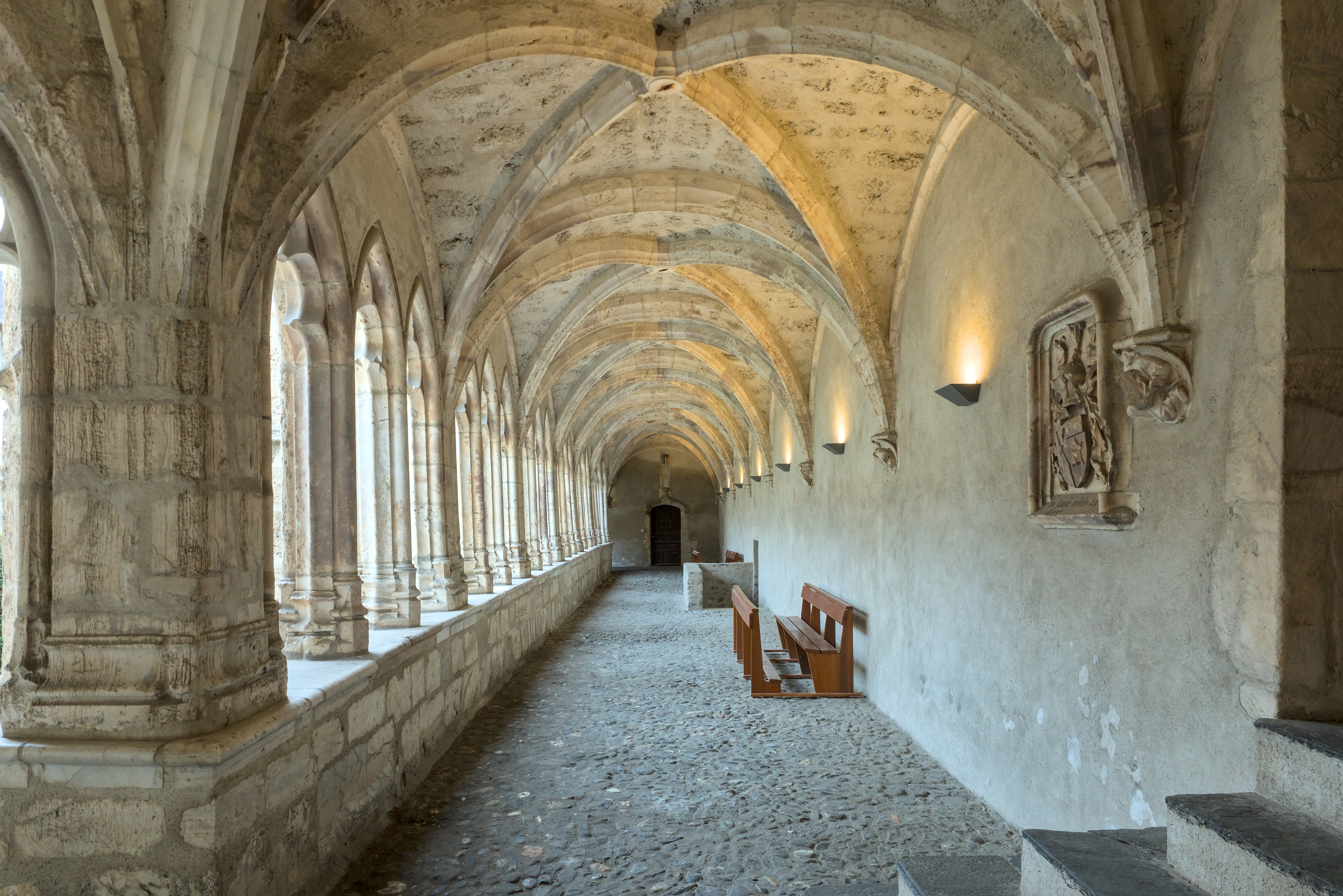
The cloister.

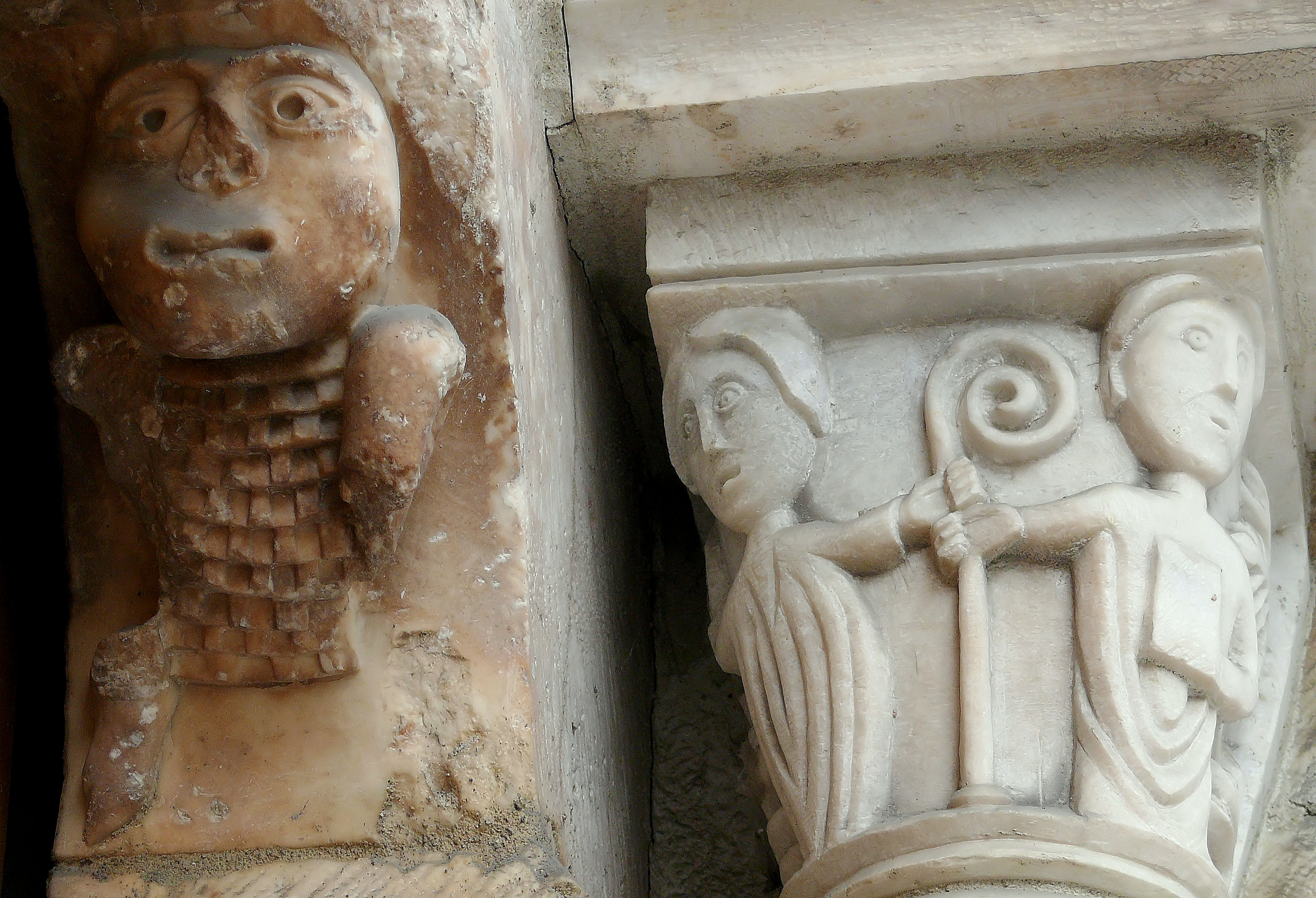
Details of the romanesque portal of Notre-Dame church.

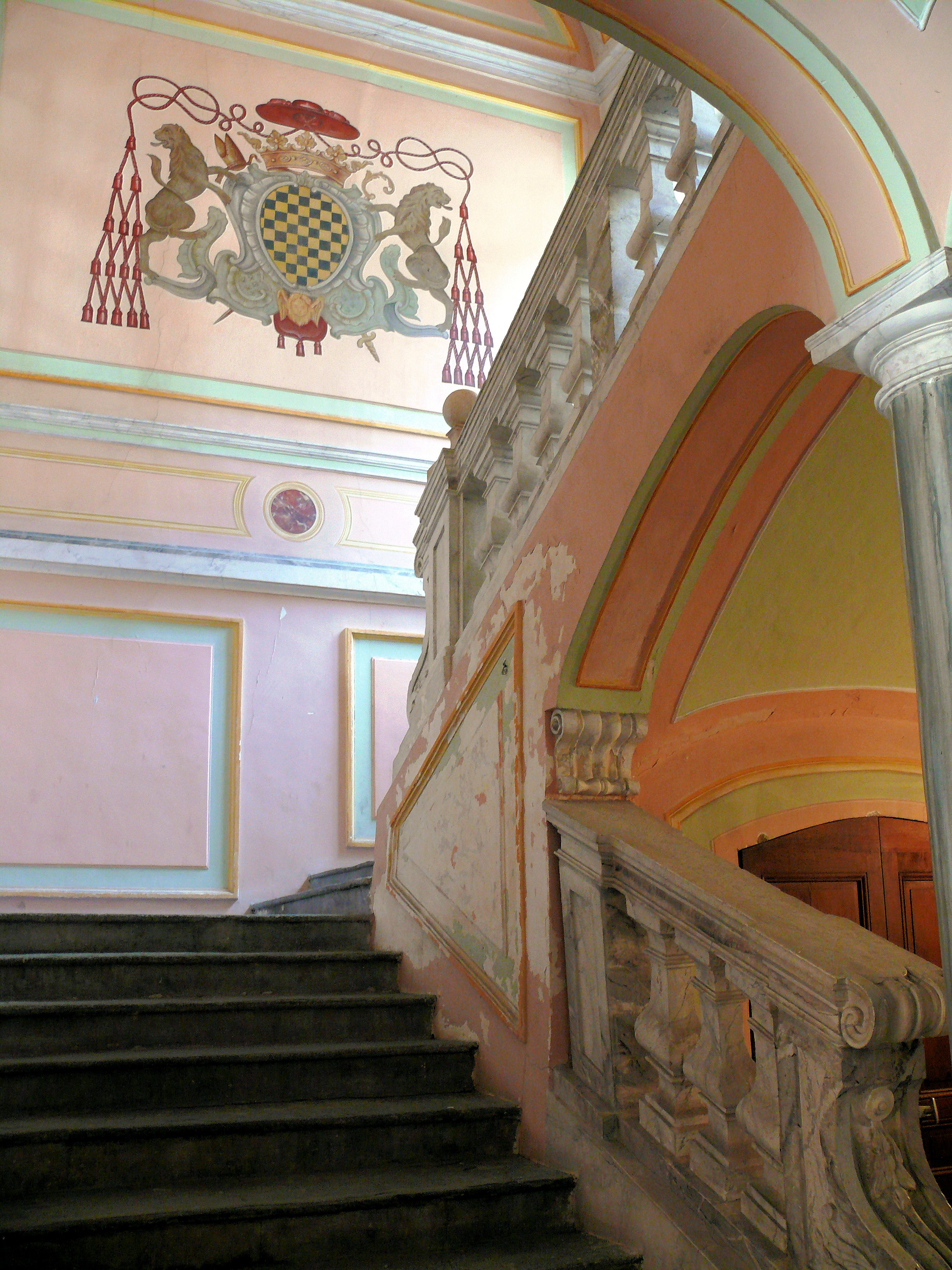
Staircase of the former bishop's palace.

- Notre-Dame church: The old parish church, now closed to the public, its origin dates back to the 11th century. The bell tower, today separated from the church, was the entrance.
- Palace of the Bishops of Maurienne or former bishop: redesigned in the 18th century and classified municipal building since 1905. The grand salon is a beautiful example of Baroque art.
- Chapel of Bonne Nouvelle: A pilgrimage place in Baroque style with ex-votos. Orientation table.
- Chapel of St. Joseph's college (137, Rue du Collège). A Baroque chapel situated in St. Joseph's college (formerly college Lambertain, founded in 1534)

==== Green spaces ====
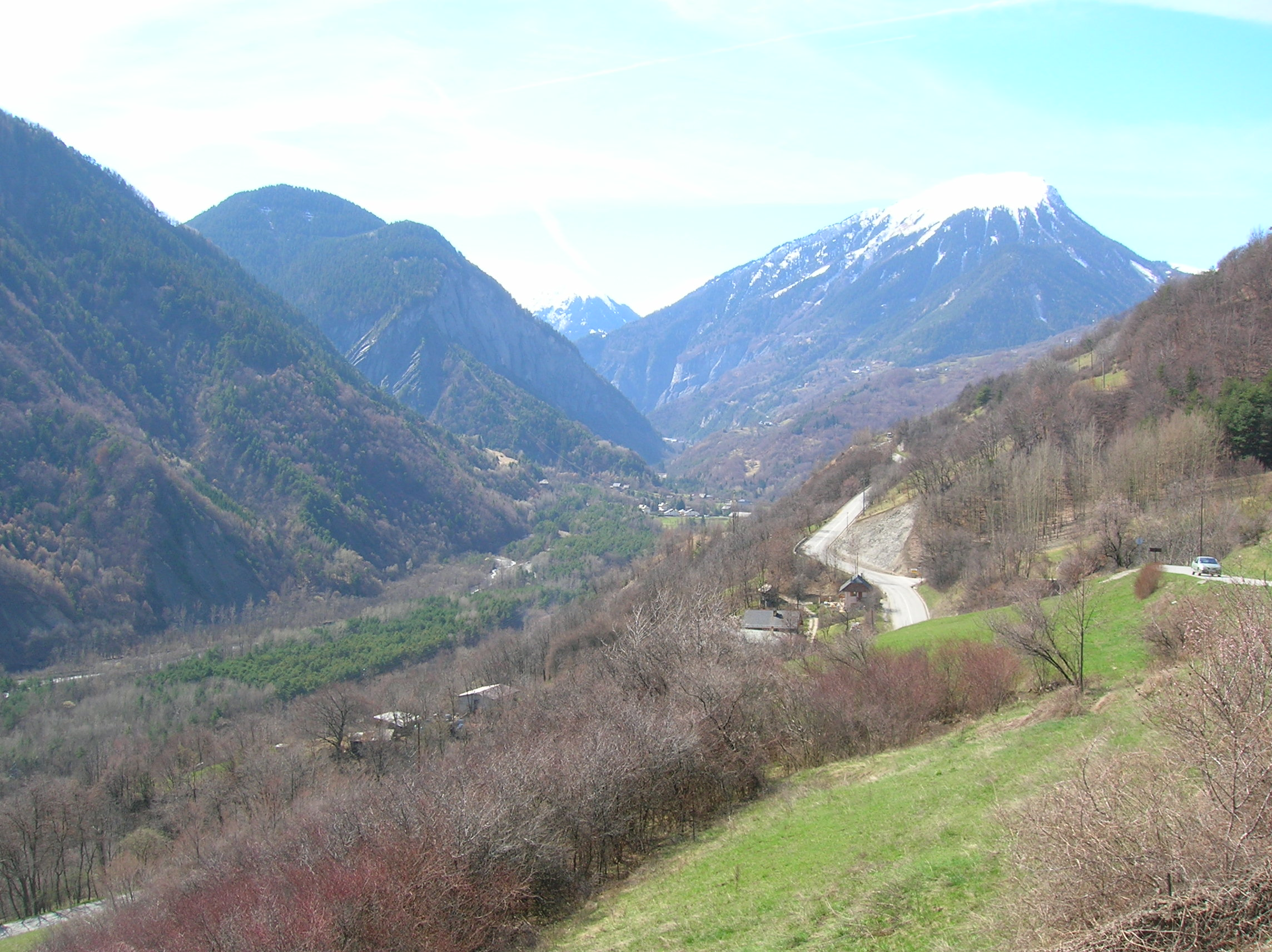
Arvan Valley

The Clos Carloz and the recreation area of the Combe are the main green spaces in the city. There is also the Garden of Europe and the Saint Ayrald Garden.

=== Cultural heritage ===
The commune has several museums:

- Museum of costumes and folk traditions: Evidence of life in the Maurienne past
- The Opinel Museum: The history of the famous small knife designed in 1890 by Joseph Opinel and used on all continents
- Mont Corbier Museum: The history of the liqueur, the still to the invention of Mont Corbier by Abbot Guille in 1888

Notable cultural associations:

- History and Archaeology Society of Maurienne

=== Green and floral spaces ===
In 2014, the commune of Saint-Jean-de-Maurienne has the "Floral City" label with "three flowers" awarded by the National Council of floral cities and villages of France in the Concours des villes et villages fleuris.

=== Personalities linked to the commune ===
Born in the commune:

- Circa. 650–750, Saint Thomas of Farfa or Thomas of Maurienne, Abbot of Farfa Abbey. Celebrated on 10 December.
- Nicolas Martin, author of Noelz in Franco-Provençal printed in Lyon in 1555.
- Antoine Rochaix (1762-1836), Bishop of Moutiers-Tarentaise (1828-1836).
- François-Emmanuel Fodéré (1764-1835), creator of forensic medicine (a statue adorns Place Fodéré in the city centre).
- Joseph Opinel (1872-1960), creator of the Opinel knife.
- Henri Falcoz (1884-1936), politician.
- Pierre Balmain (1914-1982), fashion designer.
- Jean Baghe (1927-1992), militant worker, Christian and Socialist of the Maurienne Valley.
- Pierre Fournier, (1937-1973), journalist and designer, French pamphleteer.
- Catherine Sola (1941-2014), actress.
- Jean-Noël Augert, born in 1949, alpine skier.
- Hubert Déquier, born in 1952, French poet and writer.
- Kamel Belghazi, born in 1970, actor.
- Damien Saez, born in 1977, singer, author, composer, performer.
- Jean-Pierre Vidal, born in 1977, alpine skier.
- Christophe Josse, sports journalist.
- Gérald Nguyễn, actor.
- Jean-Baptiste Grange, born in 1984, alpine skier, specialist of the technical disciplines of skiing and especially slalom.

Other personalities:

- Bishops of Saint-Jean-de-Maurienne from the 6th century to 1966
- Henry of Sévery (?-1396), born in Severy, died in Rodez, was prior of the Collégiale Saint-Barnard of Romans-sur-Isère, regent, Vice-Rector and Rector of the Comtat Venaissin, Bishop of Saint-Jean-de-Maurienne, then Bishop of Rodez.
- Francesco Gallo (INIS), Calabrian painter and sculptor, living in Saint-Jean-de-Maurienne

=== Heraldry ===
Arms of Saint-Jean-de-Maurienne	The arms of Saint-Jean-de-Maurienne are blazoned: Of azure a hand blessing of argent, dressed of same. This coat of arms was firstly that of the chapter of the cathedral, before becoming that of the city. There originated the relics of Saint John the Baptist, made in the 6th century: Three fingers of the hand which baptised Christ, hence the hand blessing symbol. This coat of arms is now widespread in much of the world, on the Opinel knife blade: The "crowned hand". The hand blessing recalls the origin of the knife, near Saint-Jean-de-Maurienne, and the ducal crown means that it is now produced in Chambéry, the capital of the Dukes of Savoy.

== See also ==
- Opinel knife
- Col de la Croix de Fer
- Agreement of St.-Jean-de-Maurienne
- Communes of the Savoie department

== Bibliography ==
- Dompnier, Pierre (September 1981). "Saint-Jean, capitale de la Maurienne" [Saint-Jean, capital of Maurienne]. Memoirs and Documents of the Société savoisienne d'histoire et d'archéologie (in French) (63). ISSN 0046-7510. coll. «L'Histoire en Savoie.
- Dompnier, Pierre (2004). Alan Sutton (ed.). Saint-Jean-de-Maurienne et son canton [Saint-Jean-de-Maurienne and its canton] (in French). Mémoire en images.
- Porte, Roland (2009). Saint-Jean-de-Maurienne : une ville à l'œuvre [Saint-Jean-de-Maurienne: A city at work] (in French). Ediville.
- Work of the society for the history and archaeology of Maurienne
