= François-Emmanuel Fodéré =

French forensic physician

François-Emmanuel Fodéré (8 January 1764, in Saint-Jean-de-Maurienne – 4 February 1835, in Strasbourg) was a French forensic physician.

In 1787 he received his medical doctorate at the University of Turin, then by way of a scholarship from Victor Amadeus III of Sardinia, he furthered his education in Paris and London. Afterwards, he enlisted in the Army of the Alps, and took part in the sieges of Marseille and Mantua. He taught classes in chemistry and physics in Nice, where he also worked as a physician at the municipal civilian and military hospital. Around 1804 he was named physician at the Hôtel-Dieu and the lunatic asylum in Marseille. In Marseille he maintained these and other positions for ten years. In 1814 he was appointed professor of medical jurisprudence at the University of Strasbourg. During the latter years of his life he suffered from eye disease, affecting his ability to read and write; thus his daughter wrote under his dictation.

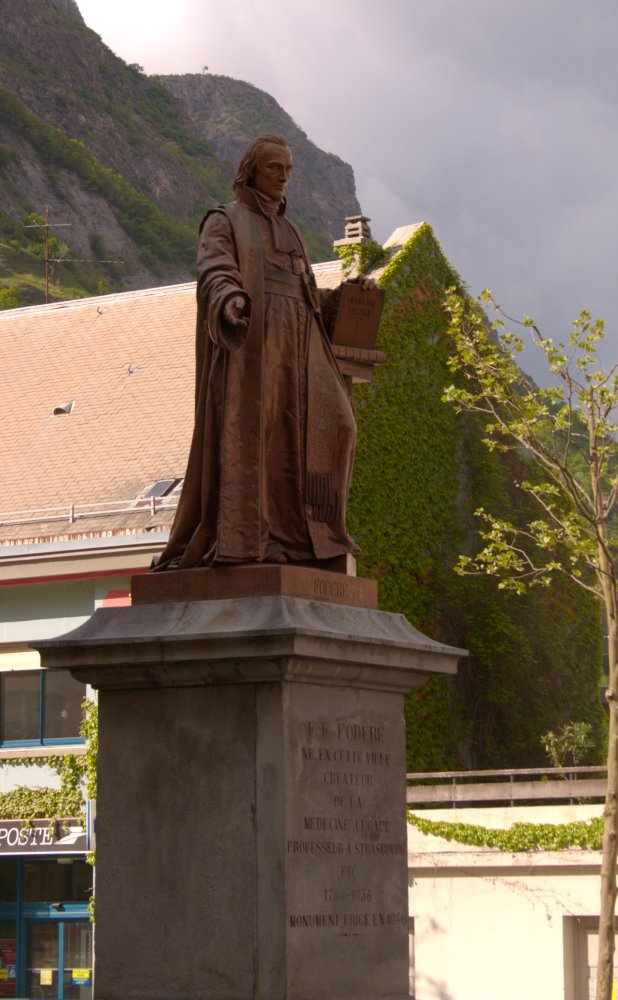
Statue of Fodéré in Saint-Jean-de-Maurienne

== Selected works ==
His six-volume Traité de médecine légale et d'hygiène publique ou de police de santé (1813) was a standard work of legal medicine in France during the early part of the 19th century. Among his other writings are the following:

- Essai sur le goitre et le crétinage, 1792 – Essay on goiter and cretinism.
- Recherches expérimentales faites a l'hôpital civil et militaire de Martiques, 1810 – Experimental research made at the civil and military hospital of Martiques.
- Voyages aux Alpes-Maritimes (2 volumes, 1821) – Travel to the Maritime Alps.
- Leçons sur les épidémies et l'hygiène publique, faites à la Faculté de médecine de Strasbourg, 1822–24 – Lessons on epidemics and public health made at the Strasbourg faculty of medicine.
