= Alexandre Vaudey =

- Born: 14 July 1815; Saint-Michel-de-Maurienne, First French Empire
- Died: 5 April 1854 (aged 38); Gondokoro, South Sudan
- Citizenship: Savoyard
- Occupation: Explorer

Alexandre Vaudey (14 July 1815 – 5 April 1854) was a Savoyard explorer and trader active in Egypt and Sudan. He served as Sardinian proconsul at Khartoum and was a member of the Société de Géographie of Paris and a corresponding member of the Royal Geographical Society of London.

== Biography ==
Alexandre Vaudey was born in 1815 in the town of Saint-Michel-de-Maurienne, in the Maurienne valley, then part of the Duchy of Savoy.

In 1839, he went to Egypt, where he taught and became tutor to the sons of Mehemet Ali. With them, he explored Upper Egypt and Sudan. He later became involved in the trade of gum and ivory. He traveled in Kordofan and attempted an expedition into Darfur, but was killed by the Bari near Gondokoro.

From 1843 to 1849, Vaudey served as secretary-general of the Sanitary Junta of Egypt. In 1851, he was joined by his two nephews, Jules and Ambroise Poncet, with whom he traveled to Sudan. In 1852, he became Sardinian proconsul at Khartoum.

He was a member of the Société de Géographie of Paris and a corresponding member of the Royal Geographical Society of London.

Vaudey was killed during an expedition on 5 April 1854 near Gondokoro, in Sudan.
