= Pontamafrey-Montpascal =

Pontamafrey-Montpascal Pon-mafrè Monpaka (Savoyard)
- Part of La Tour-en-Maurienne
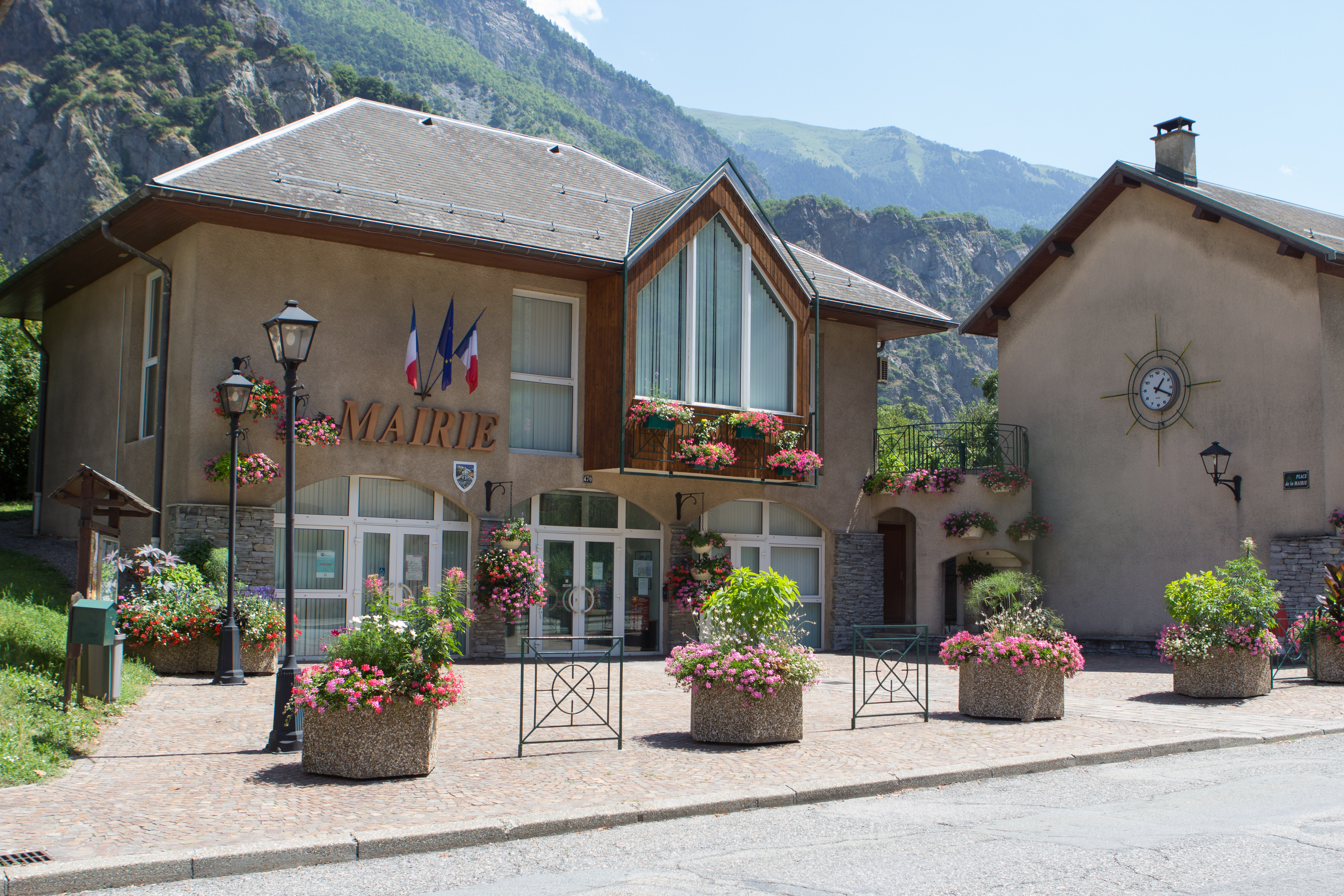
- The town hall in Pontamafrey-Montpascal
- Location of Pontamafrey-Montpascal
- Location within France Location within Auvergne-Rhône-Alpes
- Coordinates: 45°18′48″N 6°20′32″E
- Country: France
- Region: Auvergne-Rhône-Alpes
- Department: Savoie
- Arrondissement: Saint-Jean-de-Maurienne
- Canton: Saint-Jean-de-Maurienne
- Commune: La Tour-en-Maurienne
- Area^{1}: 11.59 km^{2} (4.47 sq mi)
- Highest elevation: 2,680 m (8,790 ft)
- Lowest elevation: 464 m (1,522 ft)
- Population (2022): 273
  - Density: 23.6/km^{2} (61.0/sq mi)
- Time zone: UTC+01:00 (CET)
  - Summer (DST): UTC+02:00 (CEST)
- Postal code: 73300
- Website: www.pontamafrey-montpascal.fr
- ^{1} French Land Register data, which excludes lakes, ponds, glaciers > 1 km^{2} (0.386 sq mi or 247 acres) and river estuaries.

Pontamafrey-Montpascal (Savoyard: Pon-mafrè Monpaka) is a former commune in the Savoie department in the Auvergne-Rhône-Alpes region in south-eastern France. On 1 January 2019, it was merged into the new commune La Tour-en-Maurienne.

== See also ==
- Communes of the Savoie department
