= Le Corbier =

Ski resort in the French Alps

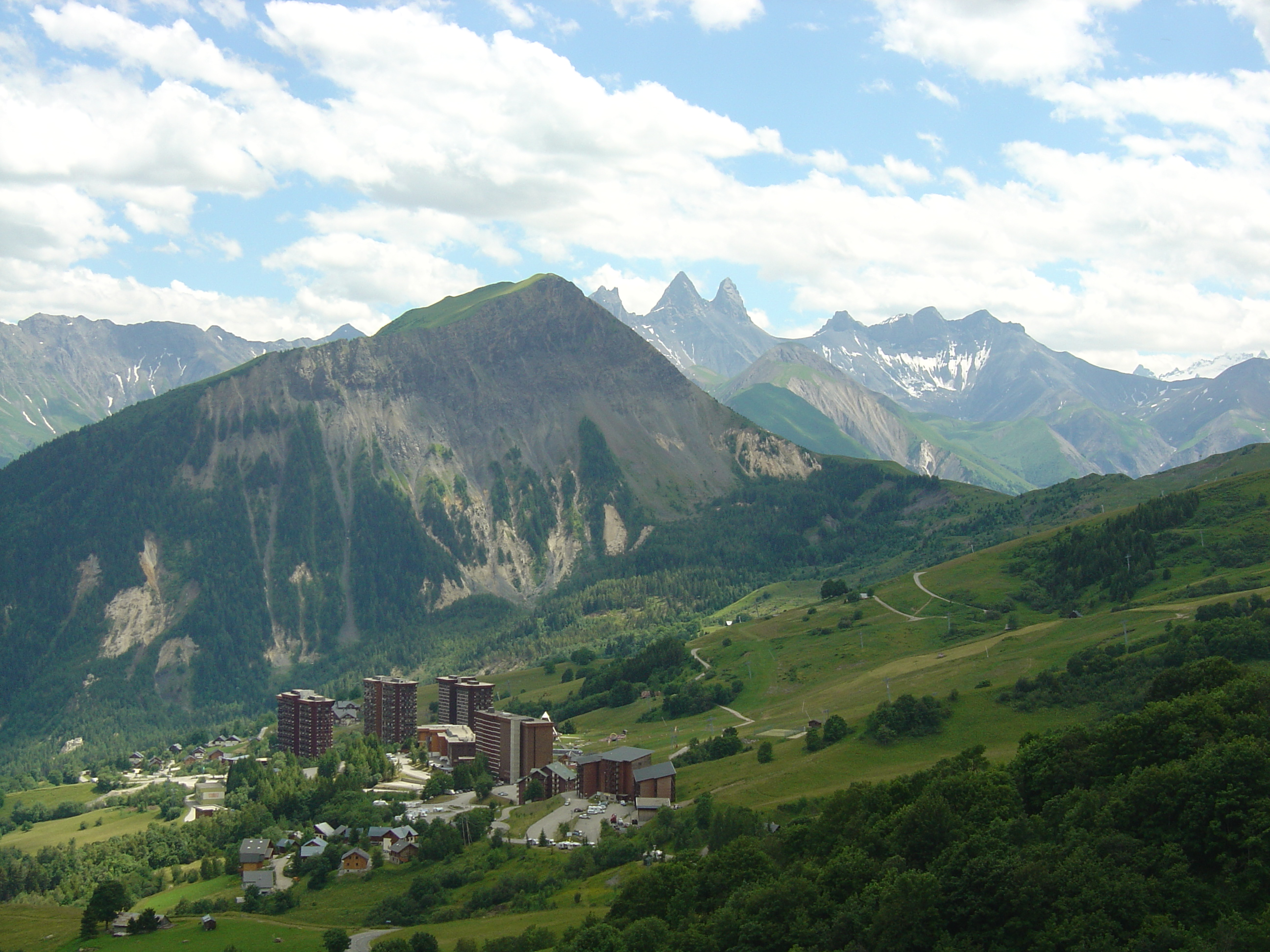
- General view of the Corbier resort

- Location within France Location within Auvergne-Rhône-Alpes Location within Alps
- Location: Villarembert, Savoie, Auvergne-Rhône-Alpes, France
- Nearest city: Grenoble
- Coordinates: 45°14′21.98″N 6°16′17″E
- Top elevation: 2,265 m (7,431 ft)
- Base elevation: 1,550 m (5,090 ft)
- Website: www.le-corbier.com

Le Corbier is a ski resort located in the commune of Villarembert, in the Savoie department and the Auvergne-Rhône-Alpes region of France. The resort is in the Les Sybelles region of the French Alps, it is the fourth largest ski area in France with 310 kilometres (190 mi) linked by lifts and pistes. The longest run is 2.9 kilometres (1.8 mi). It has a mixture of all the coloured slopes (green, blue, red and black) and is 1,550 m (5,090 ft) above sea-level. There are 26 chair lifts in Le Corbier and 50 drag lifts, the highest lift is at 2,600 m (8,500 ft). There are number of hotels in Le Corbier which include: Hotel Du Mont Corbier; Residence Maeva Les Pistes; Odalys - Les Alpages du Corbier

== Geography ==
The resort is at an altitude of 1,550 m (5,090 ft) in the heart of the Arves Massif, in Les Sybelles area and facing the Aiguilles d'Arves. The resort links with the neighbouring resorts of La Toussuire and Saint-Colomban-des-Villards to the north, and Saint-Jean-d'Arves and Saint-Sorlin-d'Arves to the south, making up a ski area with more than 300 km (190 mi) of routes. The resort is located at the foot of the 2,265 m (7,431 ft) Mont Corbier, to which it owes its name.

== History ==
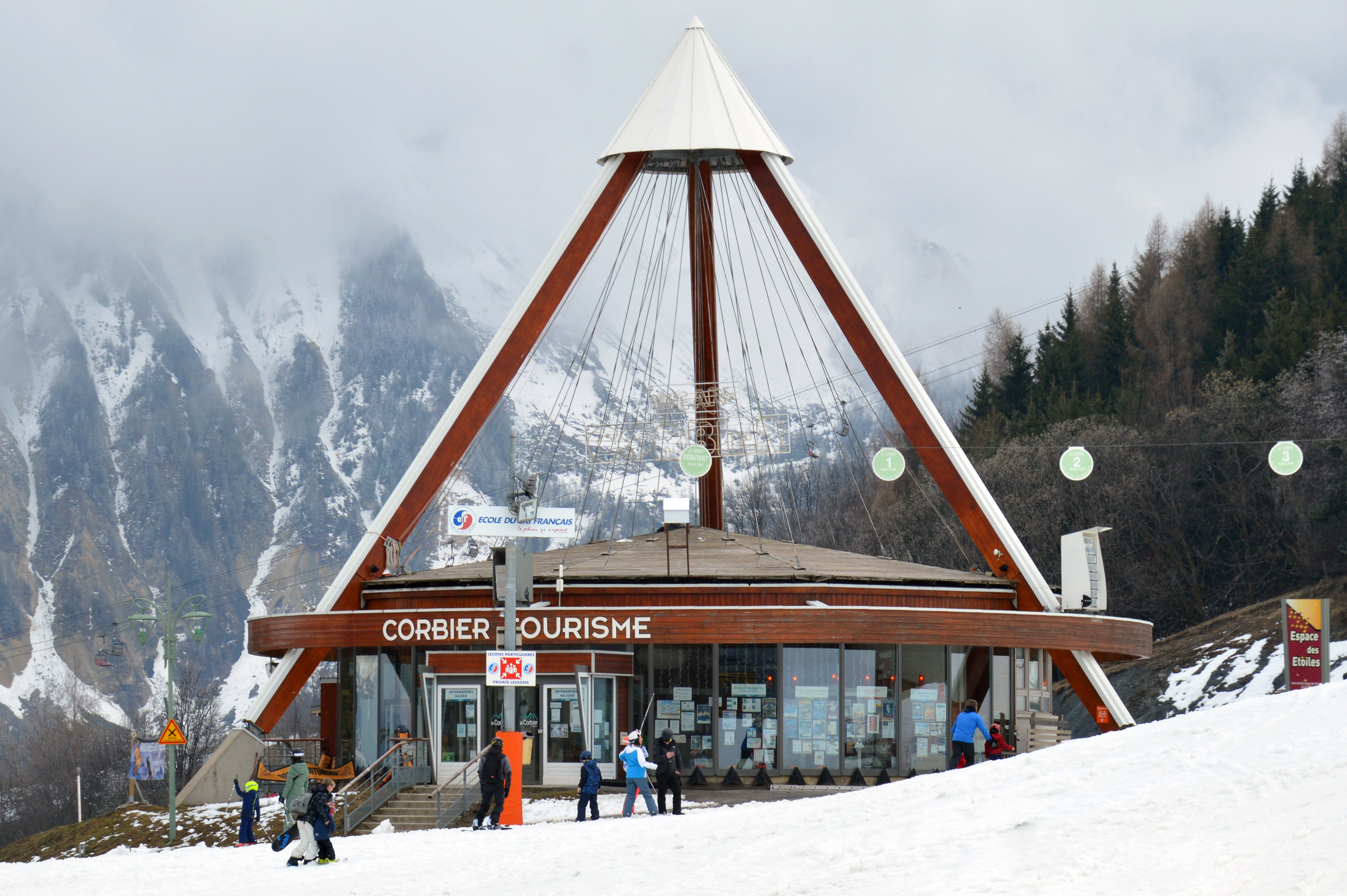
Le Corbier's distinctive tourist office at the front de neige [snow front]

Le Corbier was built on the model of other postwar ski resorts. The construction project, which had almost come to fruition in 1938 and was stopped by the Second World War, was developed from the early 1960s. After three years of study and six months of work, the resort was inaugurated in December 1967.

In 2007, the resort was awarded the "Famille Plus" label. On 8 February 2015, the resort recorded its ten millionth day of skiing sold since its creation.

== Cycling ==
The resort itself is located on the road to the higher resort of La Toussuire and therefore of its ascent. The route is occasionally used during the Tour de France and the Critérium du Dauphiné. The finish of the last stage of the 2019 Tour de l'Avenir was held in Le Corbier. The stage was won by Alexander Cepeda, while Tobias Foss won the race overall.

A bike park was opened in Le Corbier in 2019.
