= 2012 Tour de France =

Cycling competition

2012 UCI World Tour, race 18 of 29
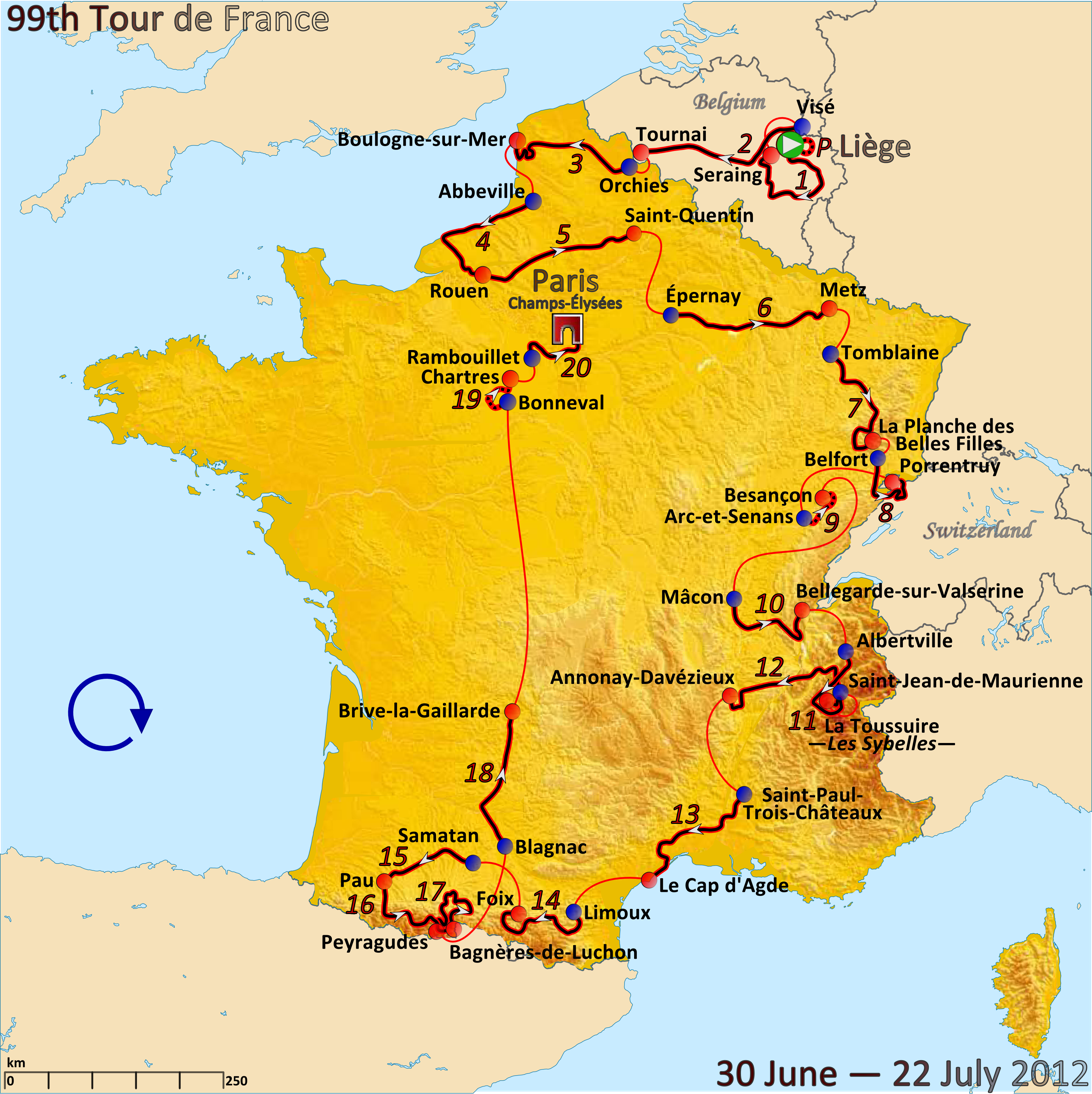
- Route of the 2012 Tour de France

Race details
- Dates: 30 June – 22 July 2012
- Stages: 20 + Prologue
- Distance: 3,496.9 km (2,172.9 mi)
- Winning time: 87h 34′ 47"

Results
Jersey awarded to the overall winner	Winner	Bradley Wiggins (GBR)	(Team Sky)
	Second	Chris Froome (GBR)	(Team Sky)
	Third	Vincenzo Nibali (ITA)	(Liquigas–Cannondale)
Jersey awarded to the points classification winner	Points	Peter Sagan (SVK)	(Liquigas–Cannondale)
Jersey awarded to the mountains classification winner	Mountains	Thomas Voeckler (FRA)	(Team Europcar)
Jersey awarded to the young rider classification winner	Young rider	Tejay van Garderen (USA)	(BMC Racing Team)
Jersey awarded to the combativity classification winner	Combativity	Chris Anker Sørensen (DEN)	(Saxo Bank–Tinkoff Bank)
Jersey awarded to the team classification winner	Team	(Luxembourg) RadioShack–Nissan	

The 2012 Tour de France was the 99th edition of the Tour de France, one of cycling's Grand Tours. It started in the Belgian city of Liège on 30 June and finished on the Champs-Élysées in Paris on 22 July. The Tour consisted of 21 stages, including an opening prologue, and covered a total distance of 3,496.9 km (2,173 mi). As well as the prologue, the first two stages took place in Belgium, and one stage finished in Switzerland. Bradley Wiggins (Team Sky) won the overall general classification, and became the first British rider to win the Tour. Wiggins's teammate Chris Froome placed second, and Vincenzo Nibali (Liquigas–Cannondale) was third.

The general classification leader's yellow jersey was worn for the first week by Fabian Cancellara (RadioShack–Nissan), who won the prologue. Wiggins, second in the prologue, took the leadership of the race on stage seven, the first mountainous stage, which was won by Froome, and maintained his lead for the remainder of the race, winning the two longest time trials, and not losing time to his main challengers for the overall title in the mountains.

The points classification was won by Nibali's teammate Peter Sagan, who won three stages. André Greipel of Lotto–Belisol and Team Sky rider Mark Cavendish also won three stages. Team Europcar's Thomas Voeckler, winner of two mountain stages, won the mountains classification. BMC Racing Team's Tejay van Garderen, in fifth place overall, won the young rider classification. The team classification was won by RadioShack–Nissan, and Chris Anker Sørensen (Saxo Bank–Tinkoff Bank) was given the award for the most combative rider.

== Teams ==
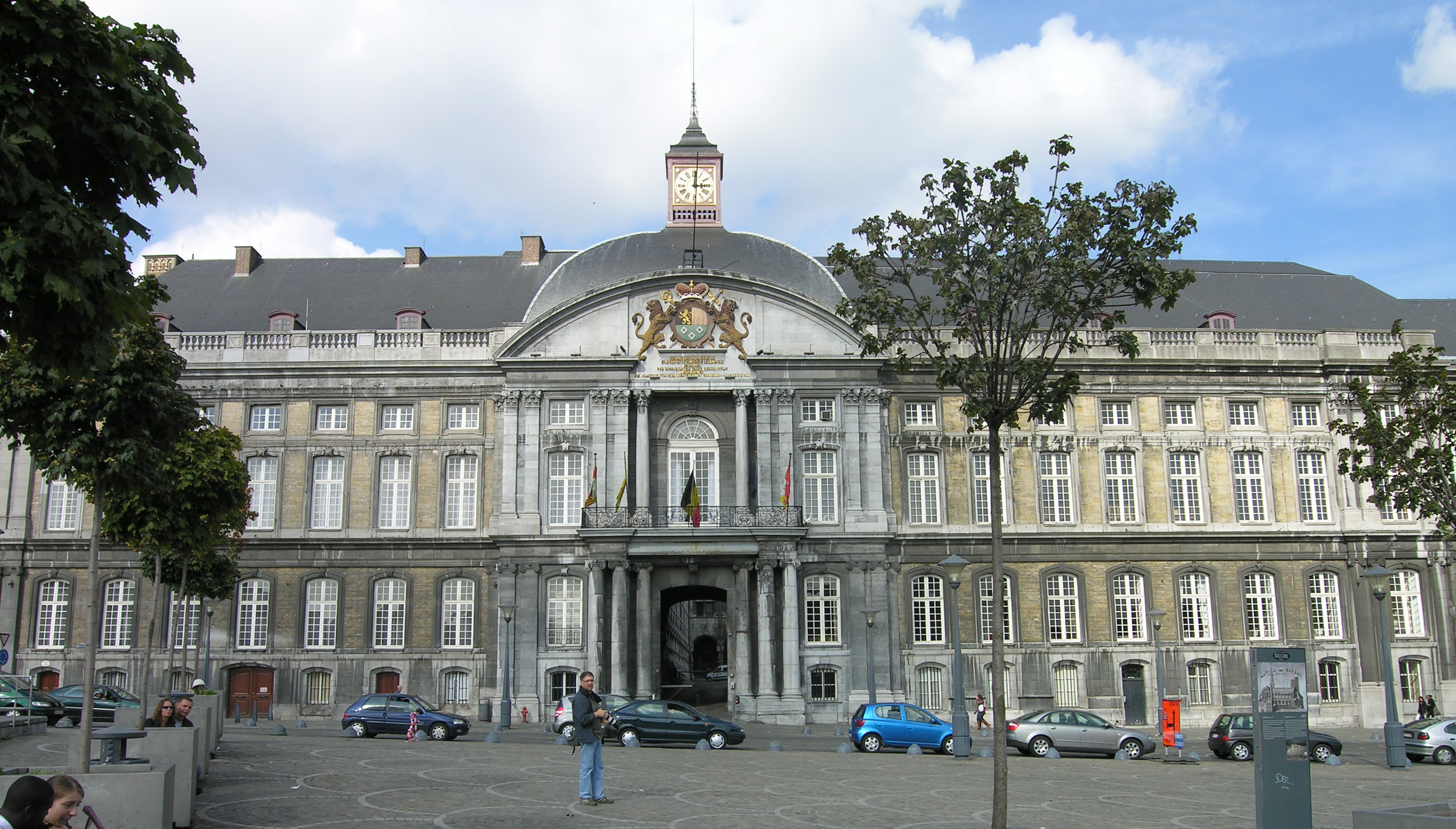
The Prince-Bishops' Palace in Liège, Belgium, hosted the team presentation ceremony on 28 June.

The 2012 edition of the Tour de France featured 22 teams. The race was the 18th of the 29 events in the UCI World Tour, and all of its eighteen UCI ProTeams were entitled, and obliged, to enter the race. On 6 April 2012, the organiser of the Tour, Amaury Sport Organisation (ASO), announced the four second-tier UCI Professional Continental teams given wildcard invitations, of which three were French-based (Cofidis, Team Europcar and Saur–Sojasun) and one was Dutch (Argos–Shimano). The presentation of the teams – where the members of each team's roster are introduced in front of the media and local dignitaries – took place outside the Prince-Bishops' Palace in Liège, Belgium, on 28 June, two days before the opening stage held in the city.

Each squad was allowed a maximum of nine riders, resulting in a start list total of 198 riders. Of these, 35 were riding the Tour de France for the first time. The riders came from 31 countries; France, Spain, Netherlands, Italy, Belgium, Germany and Australia all had 12 or more riders in the race. Riders from six countries won stages during the race; British riders won the largest number of stages, with seven. The average age of riders in the race was 30.17 years, ranging from the 22-year-old Thibaut Pinot (FDJ–BigMat) to the 40-year-old Jens Voigt (RadioShack–Nissan). The Saur–Sojasun cyclists had the youngest average age while RadioShack–Nissan cyclists had the oldest.

The teams entering the race were:

UCI ProTeams

- Ag2r–La Mondiale
- Astana
- BMC Racing Team
- Euskaltel–Euskadi
- FDJ–BigMat
- Garmin–Sharp
- Team Katusha
- Lampre–ISD
- Liquigas–Cannondale
- Lotto–Belisol
- Movistar Team
- Omega Pharma–Quick-Step
- Orica–GreenEDGE
- Rabobank
- RadioShack–Nissan
- Saxo Bank–Tinkoff Bank
- Team Sky
- Vacansoleil–DCM

UCI Professional Continental teams

- Argos–Shimano
- Cofidis
- Team Europcar
- Saur–Sojasun

== Pre-race favourites ==
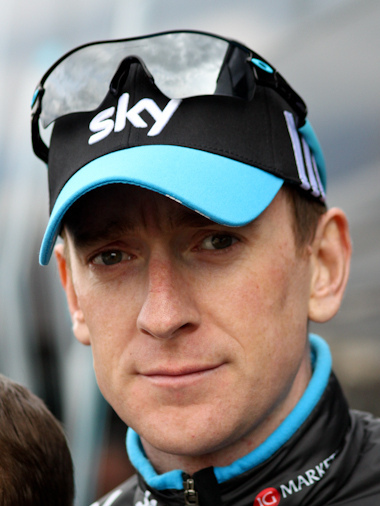
Team Sky's Bradley Wiggins was widely considered as favourite for the general classification.

According to many observers before the race the favourite for the general classification was Bradley Wiggins. His closest rivals were thought to be Cadel Evans (BMC Racing Team) and Vincenzo Nibali (Liquigas–Cannondale). Alberto Contador, the winner of both the 2007 Tour and 2009 Tour, was serving a doping suspension and did not race in the 2012 Tour. Andy Schleck, who finished second in the 2010 Tour (later promoted to the winner after Contador's result was annulled in February 2012) and 2011 Tour, was not able to recover from an injury suffered in the Critérium du Dauphiné. The other riders considered contenders for the general classification were Ryder Hesjedal (Garmin–Sharp), Fränk Schleck (RadioShack–Nissan), Samuel Sánchez (Euskaltel–Euskadi), Jurgen Van den Broeck (Lotto–Belisol), Tony Martin (Omega Pharma–Quick-Step), Denis Menchov (Team Katusha), Levi Leipheimer (Omega Pharma–Quick-Step), Alejandro Valverde (Movistar Team) and Robert Gesink (Rabobank).

Prior to the 2012 Tour, Wiggins's highest finishes in a Grand Tour were third in the 2011 Vuelta a España and fourth in the 2009 Tour (later promoted to third after Lance Armstrong's result was annulled in October 2012). Wiggins had shown his form in the lead-up to the Tour by winning the general classifications in three stage races in the 2012 season: the Paris–Nice, the Tour de Romandie and the Dauphiné. As a time trialist, Wiggins was thought to be the rider most suited to the race's course. The 2011 Tour winner Evans came back from an illness earlier in the season to win the two-day Critérium International and place third at the Dauphiné. The 2010 Vuelta a España winner Nibali had shown his form in the lead-up to the Tour by winning the Tirreno–Adriatico stage race.

The sprinters considered favourites for the points classification and wins in bunch sprint finishes were Mark Cavendish (Team Sky), André Greipel (Lotto–Belisol), Matthew Goss (Orica–GreenEDGE), Peter Sagan (Liquigas–Cannondale) and Marcel Kittel (Argos–Shimano). Cavendish, the world road race champion and defending points classification winner, did not have the full support of Team Sky as he did in the 2011 Tour with the HTC–Highroad team; Team Sky's focus was on Wiggins' general classification ambitions. He had won the four-stage race Ster ZLM Toer 13 days before the start of the Tour. Greipel, who had the full backing of his team, had shown his form in the season with thirteen victories up to the Tour. Goss was second to Cavendish at the world championships and was the new sprint leader of his team, although he had only one win in the year up to the Tour. Sagan was equal in wins with Greipel with thirteen, of which five came in the Tour of California and four in the Tour de Suisse. Kittel won two stages in both the Tour of Oman and Ster ZLM Toer.

== Route and stages ==
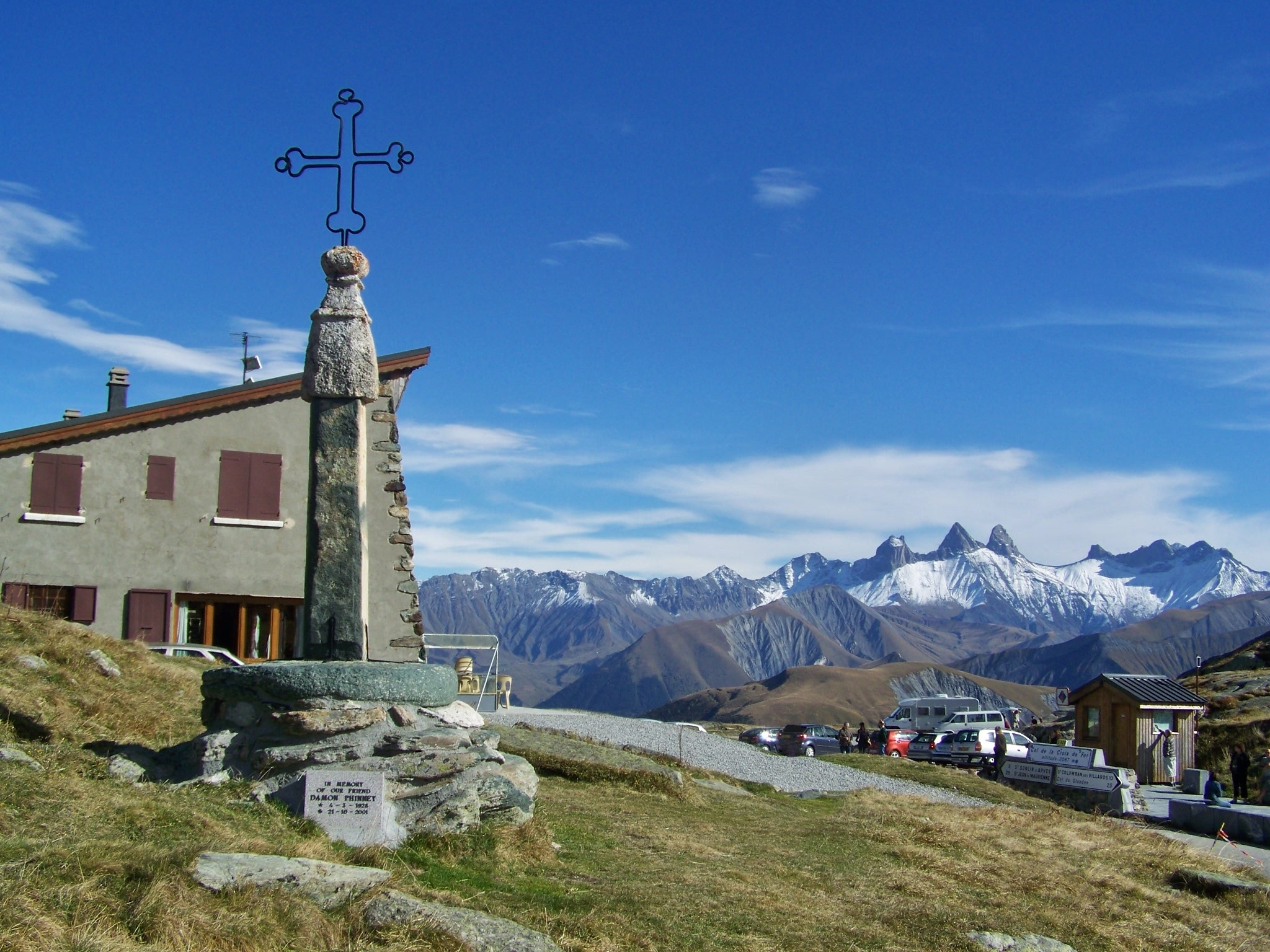
Stage eleven's Col de la Croix de Fer Alpine pass was one of the Tour's six hors catégorie (English: beyond category) rated climbs.

On 29 October 2010, the ASO announced that Liège would host the 2012 edition's opening stages (known as the Grand Départ). Further details of the first three stages held in Belgium were released at an event at the city's Prince-Bishops' Palace on 18 November. Liège, which had also hosted the 2004 Grand Départ, became the first city outside France to host the Grand Départ twice. The entire route of the race was accidentally published on the ASO website on 10 October 2011, eight days before the official presentation at the Palais des Congrès in Paris. At the event, the race director, Christian Prudhomme, said, "It's a Tour designed to widen the possibilities". The route was noted as being innovative when compared to recent years, with fewer high altitude stage finishes, and more of a focus on medium mountain stages and individual time trials. Due to a clash with the start of the Olympics at the end of July, the Tour began a week earlier than usual.

After the opening prologue in Liège, stage one left the city with the finish in Seraing. The second stage took place between Visé to Tournai. The race then moved into north-west France, with the third stage ending in the coastal city of Boulogne-sur-Mer, before the fourth ended in Rouen, and the fifth in Saint-Quentin. Stage six took the race east, with the seventh ending in the Vosges Mountains. Stage eight then entered the Jura Mountains, with the finish in Porrentruy, Switzerland. A return to France saw the next stage take place between Arc-et-Senans to Besançon. The next stages, ten and eleven, went into the Alps, and stages twelve and thirteen took the Tour down to the Mediterranean coast at Cap d'Agde. Stage fourteen moved the race into the east of Pyrenees, before a transitional stage taking it to the western side of the mountains for the next two stages. Stage eighteen was held between Blagnac to Brive-la-Gaillarde in the south of the country, before a long transfer took the race back to the north-east for two further stages, with the finish on the Champs-Élysées in Paris.

There were 21 stages in the race, covering a total distance of 3,496.9 km (2,173 mi), 133.1 km (82.7 mi) shorter than the 2011 Tour. The longest mass-start stage was the twelfth at 226 km (140 mi), and stage 21 was the shortest at 120 km (75 mi). The race featured twice the time trialling distance of the previous Tour, a total of 101.1 km (63 mi), with the prologue, stage nine and stage nineteen. Of the remaining stages, nine were officially classified as flat, four as medium mountain and five as high mountain. There were three summit finishes: stage 7, to La Planche des Belles Filles; stage 11, to La Toussuire-Les Sybelles; and stage 17, to Peyragudes. The Col du Grand Colombier, in the Alps, was included for the first time, and was among six hors catégorie (English: beyond category) rated climbs in the race. The highest point of elevation in the race was the 2,115 m (6,939 ft)-high Col du Tourmalet mountain pass on stage sixteen. There were nine new stage start or finish locations. The rest days were after stage nine, in Mâcon, and fifteen, in Pau.

Stage characteristics and winners
Stage	Date	Course	Distance	Type	Winner
P	30 June	Liège (Belgium)	6.4 km (4 mi)	Individual time trial	Fabian Cancellara (SUI)
1	1 July	Liège (Belgium) to Seraing (Belgium)	198 km (123 mi)	Flat stage	Peter Sagan (SVK)
2	2 July	Visé (Belgium) to Tournai (Belgium)	207.5 km (129 mi)	Flat stage	Mark Cavendish (GBR)
3	3 July	Orchies to Boulogne-sur-Mer	197 km (122 mi)	Medium mountain stage	Peter Sagan (SVK)
4	4 July	Abbeville to Rouen	214.5 km (133 mi)	Flat stage	André Greipel (GER)
5	5 July	Rouen to Saint-Quentin	196.5 km (122 mi)	Flat stage	André Greipel (GER)
6	6 July	Épernay to Metz	205 km (127 mi)	Flat stage	Peter Sagan (SVK)
7	7 July	Tomblaine to La Planche des Belles Filles	199 km (124 mi)	Medium mountain stage	Chris Froome (GBR)
8	8 July	Belfort to Porrentruy (Switzerland)	157.5 km (98 mi)	Medium mountain stage	Thibaut Pinot (FRA)
9	9 July	Arc-et-Senans to Besançon	41.5 km (26 mi)	Individual time trial	Bradley Wiggins (GBR)
	10 July	Mâcon		Rest day	
10	11 July	Mâcon to Bellegarde-sur-Valserine	194.5 km (121 mi)	High mountain stage	Thomas Voeckler (FRA)
11	12 July	Albertville to La Toussuire-Les Sybelles	148 km (92 mi)	High mountain stage	Pierre Rolland (FRA)
12	13 July	Saint-Jean-de-Maurienne to Annonay-Davézieux	226 km (140 mi)	Medium mountain stage	David Millar (GBR)
13	14 July	Saint-Paul-Trois-Châteaux to Cap d'Agde	217 km (135 mi)	Flat stage	André Greipel (GER)
14	15 July	Limoux to Foix	191 km (119 mi)	High mountain stage	Luis León Sánchez (ESP)
15	16 July	Samatan to Pau	158.5 km (98 mi)	Flat stage	Pierrick Fédrigo (FRA)
	17 July	Pau		Rest day	
16	18 July	Pau to Bagnères-de-Luchon	197 km (122 mi)	High mountain stage	Thomas Voeckler (FRA)
17	19 July	Bagnères-de-Luchon to Peyragudes	143.5 km (89 mi)	High mountain stage	Alejandro Valverde (ESP)
18	20 July	Blagnac to Brive-la-Gaillarde	222.5 km (138 mi)	Flat stage	Mark Cavendish (GBR)
19	21 July	Bonneval to Chartres	53.5 km (33 mi)	Individual time trial	Bradley Wiggins (GBR)
20	22 July	Rambouillet to Paris (Champs-Élysées)	120 km (75 mi)	Flat stage	Mark Cavendish (GBR)
	Total		3,496.9 km (2,173 mi)		

== Race overview ==
=== Opening week ===
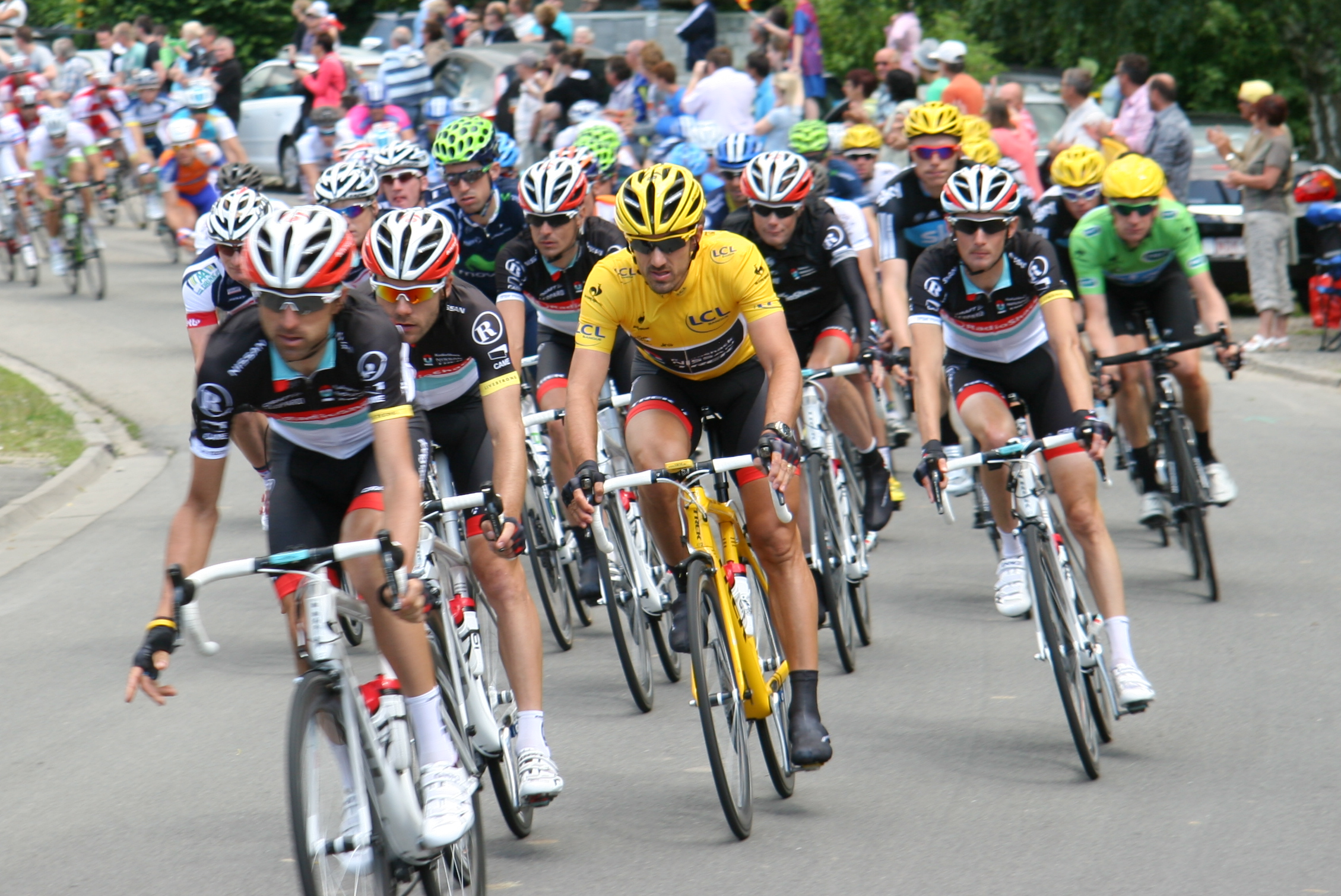
RadioShack–Nissan rider Fabian Cancellara (pictured in stage one) held the general classification leader's yellow jersey after the opening prologue until the end of stage seven.

The opening 6.4 km (4 mi) prologue stage in Liège was won by RadioShack–Nissan's Fabian Cancellara. Bradley Wiggins and Sylvain Chavanel (Omega Pharma–Quick-Step) placed second and third respectively, both seven seconds in arrears, with Wiggins fractionally faster. Cancellara claimed the yellow jersey as leader of the general classification and the green jersey as leader of the points classification. In stage one, a large group of riders reached the final climb, the Côte de Seraing. Cancellara attacked 1.5 km (0.9 mi) from the finish, followed by Peter Sagan and Edvald Boasson Hagen (Team Sky), before Sagan won the three-man sprint finish at the summit. Michael Mørkøv of Saxo Bank–Tinkoff Bank took the first polka dot jersey as leader of the mountains classification. The next stage was won by Mark Cavendish from a bunch sprint finish in Tournai, Belgium, with Sagan taking the green jersey. Stage three, the first in France, saw Sagan win again, crossing the finish line with a comfortable margin on the short steep climb in Boulogne-sur-Mer. The fourth stage ended with a bunch sprint which was won by André Greipel. A crash with 3 km (1.9 mi) remaining took Cavendish out of contention for the stage win. Another bunch finish occurred on the next stage, with Greipel victorious again. The sixth stage was won by Sagan in another bunch sprint.

=== Vosges, Jura and Alps ===
In stage seven, the first at altitude, the last of the day's breakaway riders were caught with 1.5 km (0.9 mi) remaining, on the final climb to La Planche des Belles Filles. A select group of five – Wiggins and his compatriot and teammate Chris Froome, Cadel Evans, Vincenzo Nibali and Rein Taaramäe (Cofidis) – then pulled clear in the final kilometre. Evans attacked before Froome countered and went on to win the stage and take the polka dot jersey. Cancellara lost almost two minutes on the day and surrendered the yellow jersey to Wiggins, who became the fifth British rider to wear the jersey. The eighth stage saw breakaway rider Thibaut Pinot attack a reduced break on the final climb, the Col de la Croix, and solo to the finish in Porrentruy, Switzerland, taking the victory by margin of 26 seconds. Breakaway rider Fredrik Kessiakoff (Astana) took the polka dot jersey. Stage nine's 41.5 km (25.8 mi) individual time trial was won by Wiggins, with Froome 35 seconds down in second and Cancellara a further 22 seconds behind in third. Froome moved up to third overall. The next day was the first rest day of the Tour.

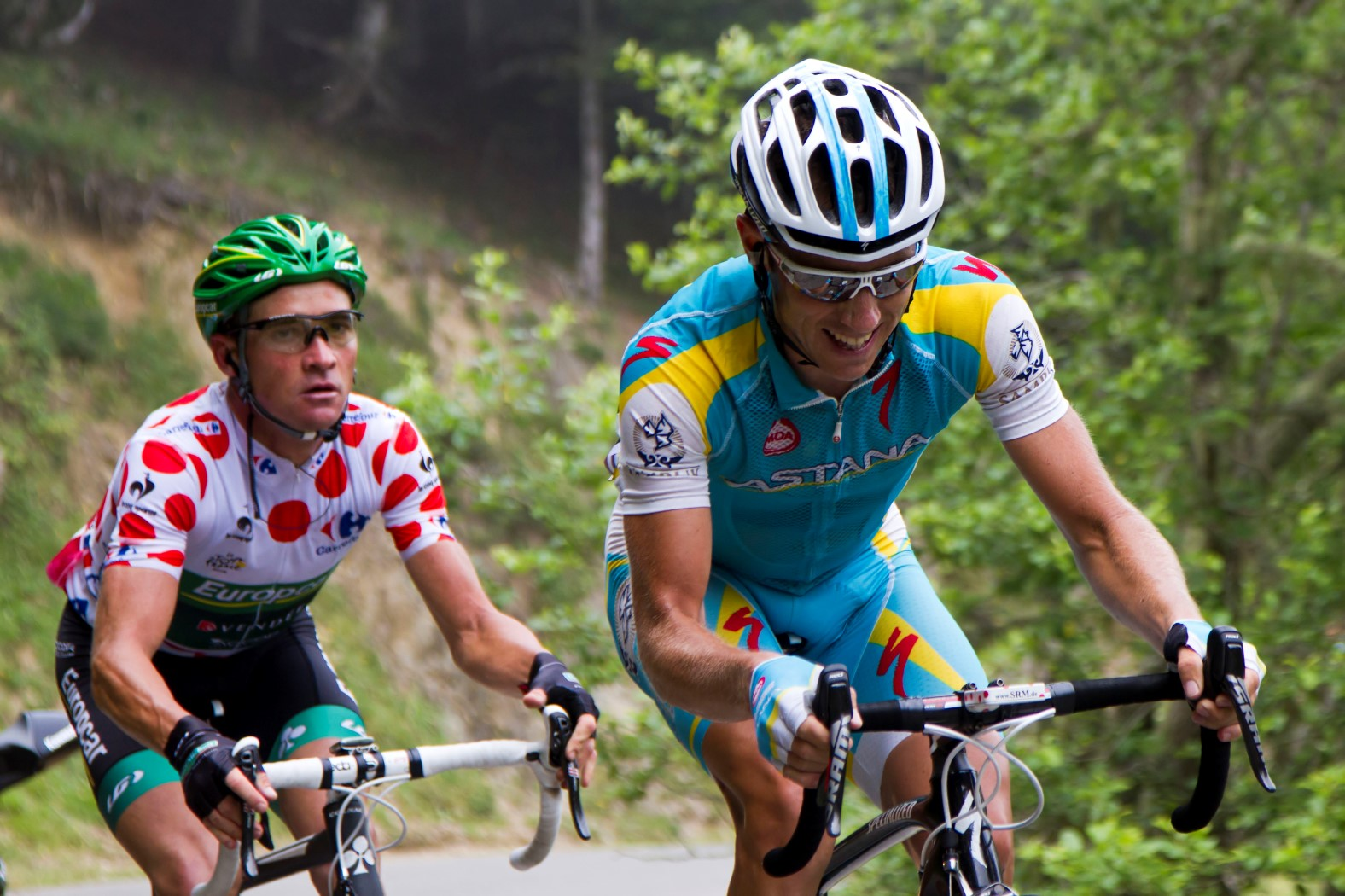
Team Europcar's Thomas Voeckler (left) and Fredrik Kessiakoff of Astana (pictured in stage seventeen) fought each other throughout the mountain stages for the climber's polka dot jersey, with Voeckler the eventual victor.

The tenth stage was the first classified as mountainous. The Col du Grand Colombier broke apart a 25-rider breakaway, leaving a small group to contest the finish at Bellegarde-sur-Valserine; Thomas Voeckler (Team Europcar) claimed the stage win and the polka dot jersey. Another mountain stage followed the next day, which again saw a large breakaway. The break crossed the two hors catégorie climbs – the Col de la Madeleine and the Col de la Croix de Fer – before being caught by the chasing group, which contained the overall contenders. A number of attacks followed, until Team Europcar's Pierre Rolland escaped with 10 km (6.2 mi) to go and took the win at the Les Sybelles ski resort. The group of overall contenders followed 55 seconds later. Evans was not in the leading contenders group and, due to the time lost, he dropped from second to fourth overall, over three minutes in arrears. Kessiakoff took back the lead of the mountains classification. In stage twelve, a large breakaway formed 20 km (12.4 mi) in, before later reducing to five riders across the Col du Granier. They stayed together until the finish, where, with a kilometre remaining, David Millar (Garmin–Sharp) escaped to take victory, closely followed by Jean-Christophe Péraud (Ag2r–La Mondiale). The next stage finished with a bunch sprint won by Greipel, with Sagan second.

=== Pyrenees ===
In the first stage in the Pyrenees, the fourteenth stage overall, a large breakaway escaped 50 km (31.1 mi) in, and at one point amassed a lead of fifteen minutes. Of the five remaining riders from the final climb of Mur de Péguère, Luis León Sánchez of Rabobank attacked on an ascent with 11.5 km (7.1 mi) remaining and soloed to the finish in Foix. As the peloton (the main group) passed the Mur de Péguère, a large number of riders suffered tyre punctures; it was later discovered that the race course had been sabotaged with carpet tacks. Evans waited over a minute to get a replacement wheel, then had a further two punctures on the descent. As an act of sportsmanship Wiggins then forced the peloton to wait for Evans to return to the group. The next stage ran through the foothills of the Pyrenees. A five-rider breakaway made it to the finish in Pau, where with 6 km (3.7 mi) to go, Christian Vande Velde (Garmin–Sharp) and Pierrick Fédrigo (FDJ–BigMat) escaped with Fédrigo winning the sprint finish between the two cyclists. The following day was the Tour's second rest day.

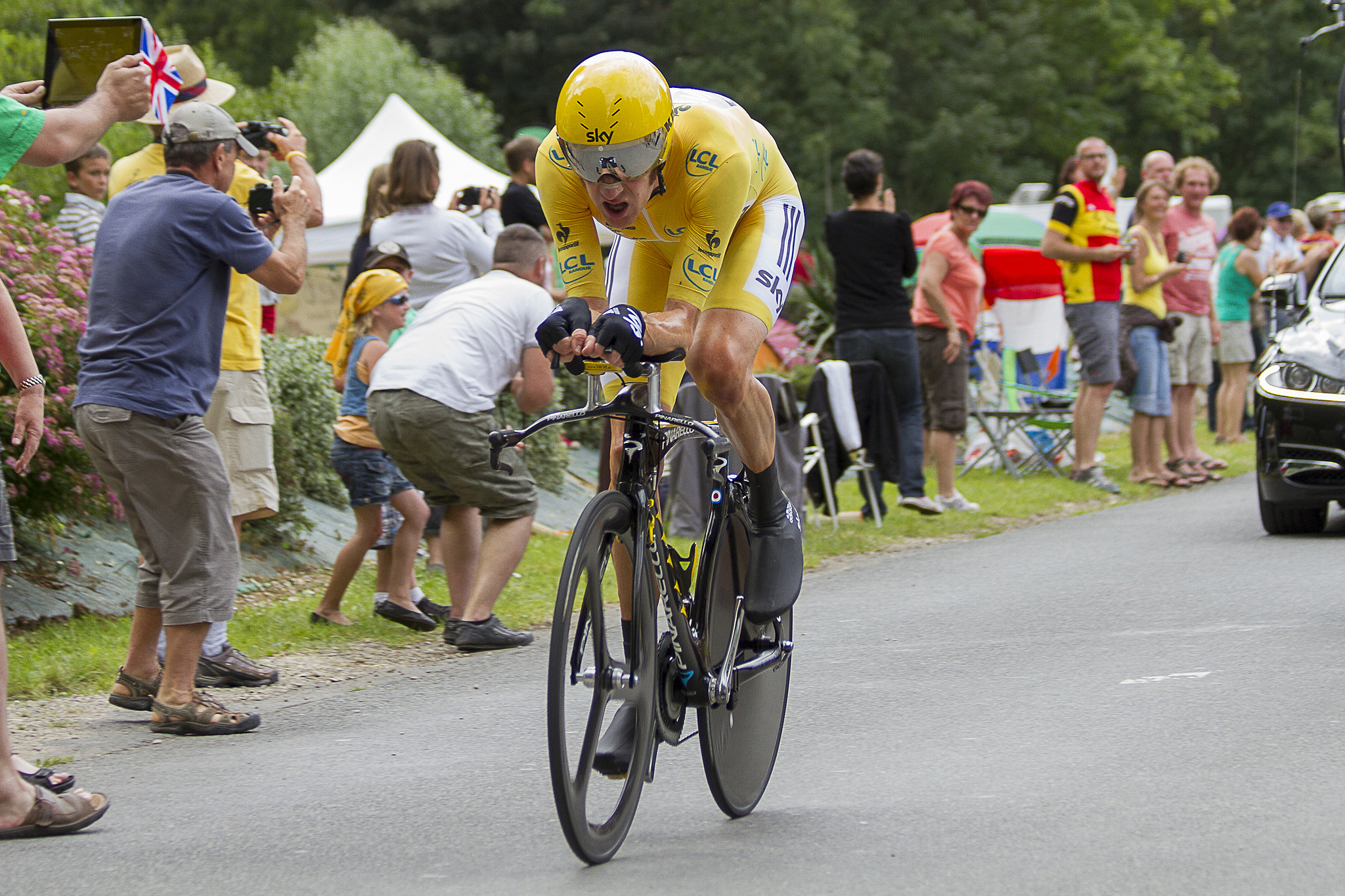
Bradley Wiggins of Team Sky secured the general classification after the individual time trial in the penultimate stage, ahead of becoming the first British rider to win the Tour.

In the sixteenth stage, the race entered the high mountains with the queen stage crossing two hors catégorie climbs – the Col d'Aubisque and the Col du Tourmalet – followed by the first-category climbs of the Col d'Aspin and the Col de Peyresourde, completing the so-called "Circle of Death". A 38-rider breakaway crossed the Aubisque, before fracturing on the Tourmalet. Voeckler attacked on the Peyresourde and took the stage win with a margin of one minute and forty seconds. Voeckler's stage victory and maximum points over all summits put him in the lead of the mountains classification. Wiggins, Froome and Nibali came in seven minutes after Voeckler, while Evans lost almost five minutes to the trio, falling from fourth to seventh in the general classification. In the final stage in the Pyrenees, the seventeenth, after a number of attacks on the leading group containing the overall contenders, Alejandro Valverde moved clear over the hors categorie Port de Balès. He held his lead to the summit finish at the Peyragudes ski resort. In the group behind, Wiggins and Froome attacked their rivals to finish nineteen seconds later. Nibali came in seventh, a further eighteen seconds down. In the following stage, six riders from a breakaway were caught on the finishing straight in Brive-la-Gaillarde by the head of the chasing peloton, with Cavendish taking the victory ahead of Matthew Goss and Sagan respectively.

=== Finale ===
Wiggins secured the general classification in the penultimate stage's 53.5 km (33.2 mi) individual time trial. Froome placed second, one minute and sixteen seconds behind, with Sánchez a further 34 seconds behind in third. In the final stage, Cavendish won his fourth consecutive Champs-Élysées stage, to record his third stage win of the race. Wiggins finished the race to become the first British rider to win the Tour de France. Wiggins finished 3 min 21 s clear of compatriot and teammate Froome. Nibali placed third at 6 min 19 s behind Wiggins. Sagan won the points classification with a total of 421, 141 ahead of Greipel in second. Voeckler won the mountains classification with 135 points, 12 ahead of second-placed Kessiakoff. The best young rider was BMC Racing Team rider Tejay van Garderen, who was followed by Pinot and Steven Kruijswijk (Rabobank) in second and third respectively. RadioShack–Nissan finished as the winners of the team classification, over 5 min 46 s ahead of second-placed Team Sky. Of the 198 starters, 153 reached the finish of the last stage in Paris.

=== Doping ===
During the race's first rest day, the team hotel of the Cofidis squad, in Bourg-en-Bresse, was searched by French police and gendarmerie. One of the team's riders in the Tour, Rémy Di Gregorio, was arrested in relation to an ongoing anti-doping case, and was immediately suspended by the French team, although the case had been open since 2011, when Di Gregorio was a member of the Astana team. The second rest day was marked by a positive drugs test by Fränk Schleck, the third-placed rider from the 2011 Tour. Schleck was withdrawn from the race by his team after traces of xipamide, a banned sulfonamide diuretic drug, were found in the A-sample of his urine; the presence of xipamide was later confirmed by the B-sample. Subsequently, in January 2013, he was given a one-year ban by the Luxembourg Anti-Doping Agency. In July 2014, Denis Menchov was retroactively disqualified from the race by cycling's governing body, Union Cycliste Internationale, for "abnormalities in his biological passport".

== Classification leadership and minor prizes ==
There were four main individual classifications contested in the 2012 Tour de France, as well as a team competition. The most important was the general classification, which was calculated by adding each rider's finishing times on each stage. There were no time bonuses given at the end of stages for this edition of the Tour. If a crash had happened within the final 3 km (1.9 mi) of a stage, not including time trials and summit finishes, the riders involved would have received the same time as the group they were in when the crash occurred. The rider with the lowest cumulative time was the winner of the general classification and was considered the overall winner of the Tour. The rider leading the classification wore a yellow jersey.

Points classification points for the top 15 positions by type
Type	1	2	3	4	5	6	7	8	9	10	11	12	13	14	15
Flat stage	45	35	30	26	22	20	18	16	14	12	10	8	6	4	2
Medium mountain stage	30	25	22	19	17	15	13	11	9	7	6	5	4	3	2
High mountain stage	20	17	15	13	11	10	9	8	7	6	5	4	3	2	1
Individual time trial	20	17	15	13	11	10	9	8	7	6	5	4	3	2	1
Intermediate sprint	20	17	15	13	11	10	9	8	7	6	5	4	3	2	1

The second classification was the points classification. Riders received points for finishing in the top fifteen positions in a stage finish, or in intermediate sprints during the stage. The points available for each stage finish were determined by the stage's type. The flat stage finishes awarded a maximum of 45 points, the medium mountain stages awarded a maximum of 30 points, and the high mountain stages, time trials and intermediate sprints awarded a maximum of 20 points. The leader was identified by a green jersey.

The third classification was the mountains classification. Most stages of the race included one or more categorised climbs, in which points were awarded to the riders that reached the summit first. The climbs were categorised as fourth-, third-, second- or first-category and hors catégorie, with the more difficult climbs rated lower. Fourth-category awarded 1 rider with 1 point; third-category awarded 2 riders, the first with 2 points; second-category awarded 4 riders, the first with 5 points; and first-category awarded 6 riders, the first with 10 points; and hors catégorie awarded ten riders, the first with 25 points. Double points were awarded on the summit finishes on stages 1, 11 and 20. The leader wore a white jersey with red polka dots.

The final individual classification was the young rider classification. This was calculated the same way as the general classification, but the classification was restricted to riders who were born on or after 1 January 1987. The leader wore a white jersey.

The final classification was a team classification. This was calculated using the finishing times of the best three riders per team on each stage; the leading team was the team with the lowest cumulative time. The number of stage victories and placings per team determined the outcome of a tie. The riders in the team that lead this classification were identified with yellow number bibs on the back of their jerseys and, for first the time in the Tour's history, wore yellow helmets. (Note: Until the 1990 Tour, the team classification leaders could be recognised by yellow casquettes (English: caps).)

In addition, there was a combativity award given after each stage to the rider considered, by a jury, to have "made the greatest effort and who has demonstrated the best qualities of sportsmanship". No combativity awards were given for the prologue, the time trials and the final stage. The winner wore a red number bib the following stage. At the conclusion of the Tour, Chris Anker Sørensen (Saxo Bank–Tinkoff Bank) won the overall super-combativity award, again, decided by a jury.

A total of €2,414,246 was awarded in cash prizes in the race. The overall winner of the general classification received €450,000, with the second and third placed riders getting €200,000 and €100,000 respectively. All finishers of the race were awarded money. The holders of the classifications benefited on each stage they led; the final winners of the points and mountains classifications were given €25,000, while the best young rider and most combative rider got €20,000. The team classification winners were given €50,000. There were also two special awards each with a prize of €5,000, the Souvenir Henri Desgrange, given to the first rider to pass the summit of the Col de la Croix de Fer in stage eleven, (Note: The Souvenir Henri Desgrange is given to the first rider to pass the summit of the highest climb in a Tour. As the highest summit of the 2012 Tour, the 2,115 m (6,939 ft)-high Col du Tourmalet, was used for the Souvenir Jacques Goddet, the second highest climb, the 2,067 m (6,781 ft)-high Col de la Croix de Fer, was used for the Souvenir Henri Desgrange.) and the Souvenir Jacques Goddet, given to the first rider to pass Goddet's memorial at the summit of the Col du Tourmalet in stage sixteen. Pierre Rolland won the Henri Desgrange and Thomas Voeckler won the Jacques Goddet.

Classification leadership by stage
Stage	Winner	General classification	Points classification	Mountains classification	Young rider classification	Team classification	Combativity award
P	Fabian Cancellara	Fabian Cancellara	Fabian Cancellara	no award	Tejay van Garderen	Team Sky	no award
1	Peter Sagan	Fabian Cancellara	Fabian Cancellara	Michael Mørkøv	Tejay van Garderen	Team Sky	Nicolas Edet
2	Mark Cavendish	Fabian Cancellara	Peter Sagan	Michael Mørkøv	Tejay van Garderen	Team Sky	Anthony Roux
3	Peter Sagan	Fabian Cancellara	Peter Sagan	Michael Mørkøv	Tejay van Garderen	Team Sky	Michael Mørkøv
4	André Greipel	Fabian Cancellara	Peter Sagan	Michael Mørkøv	Tejay van Garderen	Team Sky	Yukiya Arashiro
5	André Greipel	Fabian Cancellara	Peter Sagan	Michael Mørkøv	Tejay van Garderen	Team Sky	Mathieu Ladagnous
6	Peter Sagan	Fabian Cancellara	Peter Sagan	Michael Mørkøv	Tejay van Garderen	Team Sky	David Zabriskie
7	Chris Froome	Bradley Wiggins	Peter Sagan	Chris Froome	Rein Taaramäe	Team Sky	Luis León Sánchez
8	Thibaut Pinot	Bradley Wiggins	Peter Sagan	Fredrik Kessiakoff	Rein Taaramäe	RadioShack–Nissan	Fredrik Kessiakoff
9	Bradley Wiggins	Bradley Wiggins	Peter Sagan	Fredrik Kessiakoff	Tejay van Garderen	RadioShack–Nissan	no award
10	Thomas Voeckler	Bradley Wiggins	Peter Sagan	Thomas Voeckler	Tejay van Garderen	RadioShack–Nissan	Thomas Voeckler
11	Pierre Rolland	Bradley Wiggins	Peter Sagan	Fredrik Kessiakoff	Tejay van Garderen	RadioShack–Nissan	Pierre Rolland
12	David Millar	Bradley Wiggins	Peter Sagan	Fredrik Kessiakoff	Tejay van Garderen	RadioShack–Nissan	Robert Kišerlovski
13	André Greipel	Bradley Wiggins	Peter Sagan	Fredrik Kessiakoff	Tejay van Garderen	RadioShack–Nissan	Michael Mørkøv
14	Luis León Sánchez	Bradley Wiggins	Peter Sagan	Fredrik Kessiakoff	Tejay van Garderen	RadioShack–Nissan	Peter Sagan
15	Pierrick Fédrigo	Bradley Wiggins	Peter Sagan	Fredrik Kessiakoff	Tejay van Garderen	RadioShack–Nissan	Nicki Sørensen
16	Thomas Voeckler	Bradley Wiggins	Peter Sagan	Thomas Voeckler	Tejay van Garderen	RadioShack–Nissan	Thomas Voeckler
17	Alejandro Valverde	Bradley Wiggins	Peter Sagan	Thomas Voeckler	Tejay van Garderen	RadioShack–Nissan	Alejandro Valverde
18	Mark Cavendish	Bradley Wiggins	Peter Sagan	Thomas Voeckler	Tejay van Garderen	RadioShack–Nissan	Alexander Vinokourov
19	Bradley Wiggins	Bradley Wiggins	Peter Sagan	Thomas Voeckler	Tejay van Garderen	RadioShack–Nissan	no award
20	Mark Cavendish	Bradley Wiggins	Peter Sagan	Thomas Voeckler	Tejay van Garderen	RadioShack–Nissan	no award
Final		Bradley Wiggins	Peter Sagan	Thomas Voeckler	Tejay van Garderen	RadioShack–Nissan	Chris Anker Sørensen

- In stage one, Bradley Wiggins, who was second in the points classification, wore the green jersey, because first placed Fabian Cancellara wore the yellow jersey as leader of the general classification.
- In stage two, Peter Sagan, who was second in the points classifications, wore the green jersey, because Fabian Cancellara wore the yellow jersey as leader of the general classification during that stage.

== Final standings ==
Legend
A yellow jersey	Denotes the winner of the general classification	A green jersey	Denotes the winner of the points classification
A white jersey with red polka dots	Denotes the winner of the mountains classification	A white jersey	Denotes the winner of the young rider classification
A white jersey with a yellow number bib	Denotes the winner of the team classification	A white jersey with a red number bib	Denotes the winner of the super-combativity award

=== General classification ===
Final general classification (1–10)
Rank	Rider	Team	Time
1	Bradley Wiggins (GBR)	Team Sky	87h 34' 47"
2	Chris Froome (GBR)	Team Sky	+ 3' 21"
3	Vincenzo Nibali (ITA)	Liquigas–Cannondale	+ 6' 19"
4	Jurgen Van den Broeck (BEL)	Lotto–Belisol	+ 10' 15"
5	Tejay van Garderen (USA)	BMC Racing Team	+ 11' 04"
6	Haimar Zubeldia (ESP)	RadioShack–Nissan	+ 15' 41"
7	Cadel Evans (AUS)	BMC Racing Team	+ 15' 49"
8	Pierre Rolland (FRA)	Team Europcar	+ 16' 26"
9	Janez Brajkovič (SLO)	Astana	+ 16' 33"
10	Thibaut Pinot (FRA)	FDJ–BigMat	+ 17' 17"

Final general classification (11–153)
Rank	Rider	Team	Time
11	Andreas Klöden (GER)	RadioShack–Nissan	+ 17' 54"
12	Nicolas Roche (IRL)	Ag2r–La Mondiale	+ 19' 33"
13	Chris Horner (USA)	RadioShack–Nissan	+ 19' 55"
14	Chris Anker Sørensen (DEN)	Saxo Bank–Tinkoff Bank	+ 25' 27"
DSQ	~~Denis Menchov (RUS)~~ (Note: In July 2014, Denis Menchov was retroactively disqualified from the 2012 Tour de France by cycling's governing body, Union Cycliste Internationale, for "abnormalities in his biological passport". The riders positioned below Menchov were not upgraded.)	~~Team Katusha~~	~~+ 27' 22"~~
16	Maxime Monfort (BEL)	RadioShack–Nissan	+ 28' 30"
17	Egoi Martínez (ESP)	Euskaltel–Euskadi	+ 31' 46"
18	Rui Costa (POR)	Movistar Team	+ 37' 03"
19	Eduard Vorganov (RUS)	Team Katusha	+ 38' 16"
20	Alejandro Valverde (ESP)	Movistar Team	+ 42' 26"
21	Jérôme Coppel (FRA)	Saur–Sojasun	+ 45' 43"
22	Sandy Casar (FRA)	FDJ–BigMat	+ 46' 52"
23	Michael Rogers (AUS)	Team Sky	+ 54' 52"
24	Michele Scarponi (ITA)	Lampre–ISD	+ 58' 37"
25	Ivan Basso (ITA)	Liquigas–Cannondale	+ 59' 44"
26	Thomas Voeckler (FRA)	Team Europcar	+ 1h 04' 41"
27	Peter Velits (SVK)	Omega Pharma–Quick-Step	+ 1h 05' 10"
28	Laurens ten Dam (NED)	Rabobank	+ 1h 05' 39"
29	Jelle Vanendert (BEL)	Lotto–Belisol	+ 1h 08' 26"
30	Juan José Cobo (ESP)	Movistar Team	+ 1h 09' 19"
31	Alexander Vinokourov (KAZ)	Astana	+ 1h 15' 21"
32	Levi Leipheimer (USA)	Omega Pharma–Quick-Step	+ 1h 16' 29"
33	Steven Kruijswijk (NED)	Rabobank	+ 1h 16' 52"
34	Richie Porte (AUS)	Team Sky	+ 1h 20' 49"
35	Dan Martin (IRL)	Garmin–Sharp	+ 1h 25' 23"
36	Rein Taaramäe (EST)	Cofidis	+ 1h 27' 52"
37	Giampaolo Caruso (ITA)	Team Katusha	+ 1h 28' 32"
38	George Hincapie (USA)	BMC Racing Team	+ 1h 30' 38"
39	Gorka Izagirre (ESP)	Euskaltel–Euskadi	+ 1h 32' 19"
40	Fredrik Kessiakoff (SWE)	Astana	+ 1h 34' 33"
41	Rafael Valls (ESP)	Vacansoleil–DCM	+ 1h 37' 57"
42	Peter Sagan (SVK)	Liquigas–Cannondale	+ 1h 38' 37"
43	Andriy Hrivko (UKR)	Astana	+ 1h 38' 41"
44	Jean-Christophe Péraud (FRA)	Ag2r–La Mondiale	+ 1h 40' 44"
45	Amaël Moinard (FRA)	BMC Racing Team	+ 1h 41' 00"
46	Philippe Gilbert (BEL)	BMC Racing Team	+ 1h 41' 35"
47	Dominik Nerz (GER)	Liquigas–Cannondale	+ 1h 42' 12"
48	Pierrick Fédrigo (FRA)	FDJ–BigMat	+ 1h 42' 39"
49	Michael Schär (SUI)	BMC Racing Team	+ 1h 43' 53"
50	Sérgio Paulinho (POR)	Saxo Bank–Tinkoff Bank	+ 1h 47' 14"
51	Yuri Trofimov (RUS)	Team Katusha	+ 1h 47' 31"
52	Jens Voigt (GER)	RadioShack–Nissan	+ 1h 50' 41"
53	Vladimir Karpets (RUS)	Movistar Team	+ 1h 51' 43"
54	Fabrice Jeandesboz (FRA)	Saur–Sojasun	+ 1h 52' 28"
55	Maxime Bouet (FRA)	Ag2r–La Mondiale	+ 1h 52' 30"
56	Edvald Boasson Hagen (NOR)	Team Sky	+ 1h 52' 34"
57	Johnny Hoogerland (NED)	Vacansoleil–DCM	+ 1h 55' 30"
58	Marcus Burghardt (GER)	BMC Racing Team	+ 1h 57' 39"
59	Davide Malacarne (ITA)	Team Europcar	+ 1h 57' 45"
60	Christian Vande Velde (USA)	Garmin–Sharp	+ 1h 58' 38"
61	Cyril Gautier (FRA)	Team Europcar	+ 1h 58' 55"
62	Mikaël Cherel (FRA)	Ag2r–La Mondiale	+ 1h 59' 53"
63	Dmitry Fofonov (KAZ)	Astana	+ 2h 03' 55"
64	Luis León Sánchez (ESP)	Rabobank	+ 2h 05' 43"
65	Sébastien Minard (FRA)	Ag2r–La Mondiale	+ 2h 06' 32"
66	Jérémy Roy (FRA)	FDJ–BigMat	+ 2h 10' 17"
67	Marco Marcato (ITA)	Vacansoleil–DCM	+ 2h 11' 36"
68	Dries Devenyns (BEL)	Omega Pharma–Quick-Step	+ 2h 12' 22"
69	Simone Stortoni (ITA)	Lampre–ISD	+ 2h 13' 39"
70	Kevin De Weert (BEL)	Omega Pharma–Quick-Step	+ 2h 13' 49"
71	Sylwester Szmyd (POL)	Liquigas–Cannondale	+ 2h 16' 15"
72	Pieter Weening (NED)	Orica–GreenEDGE	+ 2h 17' 30"
73	Christophe Riblon (FRA)	Ag2r–La Mondiale	+ 2h 17' 31"
74	Jorge Azanza (ESP)	Euskaltel–Euskadi	+ 2h 18' 58"
75	Guillaume Levarlet (FRA)	Saur–Sojasun	+ 2h 19' 43"
76	Yaroslav Popovych (UKR)	RadioShack–Nissan	+ 2h 21' 56"
77	Vasil Kiryienka (BLR)	Movistar Team	+ 2h 22' 02"
78	Andrey Kashechkin (KAZ)	Astana	+ 2h 23' 09"
79	Simon Gerrans (AUS)	Orica–GreenEDGE	+ 2h 24' 35"
80	Marco Marzano (ITA)	Lampre–ISD	+ 2h 24' 46"
81	Adam Hansen (AUS)	Lotto–Belisol	+ 2h 25' 29"
82	Christian Knees (GER)	Team Sky	+ 2h 26' 43"
83	Christophe Kern (FRA)	Team Europcar	+ 2h 29' 01"
84	Yukiya Arashiro (JPN)	Team Europcar	+ 2h 29' 13"
85	Mathieu Ladagnous (FRA)	FDJ–BigMat	+ 2h 33' 14"
86	Danilo Hondo (GER)	Lampre–ISD	+ 2h 37' 55"
87	Rubén Pérez (ESP)	Euskaltel–Euskadi	+ 2h 37' 56"
88	Martin Velits (SVK)	Omega Pharma–Quick-Step	+ 2h 40' 47"
89	Blel Kadri (FRA)	Ag2r–La Mondiale	+ 2h 41' 14"
90	Romain Zingle (BEL)	Cofidis	+ 2h 41' 44"
91	Brice Feillu (FRA)	Saur–Sojasun	+ 2h 41' 50"
92	Julien Simon (FRA)	Saur–Sojasun	+ 2h 46' 04"
93	Michael Mørkøv (DEN)	Saxo Bank–Tinkoff Bank	+ 2h 46' 14"
94	Arthur Vichot (FRA)	FDJ–BigMat	+ 2h 46' 51"
95	Steve Cummings (GBR)	BMC Racing Team	+ 2h 47' 03"
96	Lars Bak (DEN)	Lotto–Belisol	+ 2h 48' 05"
97	Stuart O'Grady (AUS)	Orica–GreenEDGE	+ 2h 50' 31"
98	Kristijan Koren (SLO)	Liquigas–Cannondale	+ 2h 51' 34"
99	Nicki Sørensen (DEN)	Saxo Bank–Tinkoff Bank	+ 2h 53' 11"
100	David Zabriskie (USA)	Garmin–Sharp	+ 2h 53' 26"
101	Rubén Plaza (ESP)	Movistar Team	+ 2h 53' 35"
102	Francis De Greef (BEL)	Lotto–Belisol	+ 2h 53' 52"
103	Koen de Kort (NED)	Argos–Shimano	+ 2h 54' 13"
104	Jürgen Roelandts (BEL)	Lotto–Belisol	+ 2h 55' 04"
105	Daniel Oss (ITA)	Liquigas–Cannondale	+ 2h 55' 24"
106	David Millar (GBR)	Garmin–Sharp	+ 2h 55' 24"
107	Samuel Dumoulin (FRA)	Cofidis	+ 2h 56' 02"
108	Luca Paolini (ITA)	Team Katusha	+ 2h 56' 21"
109	Manuel Quinziato (ITA)	BMC Racing Team	+ 2h 56' 27"
110	Michael Albasini (SUI)	Orica–GreenEDGE	+ 2h 57' 20"
111	Daryl Impey (RSA)	Orica–GreenEDGE	+ 2h 57' 29"
112	Jérôme Pineau (FRA)	Omega Pharma–Quick-Step	+ 2h 57' 58"
113	Matthieu Sprick (FRA)	Argos–Shimano	+ 2h 58' 15"
114	Federico Canuti (ITA)	Liquigas–Cannondale	+ 2h 58' 41"
115	Kris Boeckmans (BEL)	Vacansoleil–DCM	+ 3h 02' 57"
116	Maxim Iglinsky (KAZ)	Astana	+ 3h 03' 38"
117	Baden Cooke (AUS)	Orica–GreenEDGE	+ 3h 04' 30"
118	Alessandro Vanotti (ITA)	Liquigas–Cannondale	+ 3h 04' 39"
119	Joan Horrach (ESP)	Team Katusha	+ 3h 06' 27"
120	Matthew Goss (AUS)	Orica–GreenEDGE	+ 3h 06' 55"
121	Nick Nuyens (BEL)	Saxo Bank–Tinkoff Bank	+ 3h 08' 29"
122	Sébastien Hinault (FRA)	Ag2r–La Mondiale	+ 3h 08' 57"
123	André Greipel (GER)	Lotto–Belisol	+ 3h 09' 02"
124	Greg Henderson (NZL)	Lotto–Belisol	+ 3h 13' 06"
125	Bert Grabsch (GER)	Omega Pharma–Quick-Step	+ 3h 13' 06"
126	Anthony Roux (FRA)	FDJ–BigMat	+ 3h 16' 38"
127	Anders Lund (DEN)	Saxo Bank–Tinkoff Bank	+ 3h 17' 07"
128	Nicolas Edet (FRA)	Cofidis	+ 3h 17' 16"
129	Borut Božič (SLO)	Astana	+ 3h 17' 44"
130	Luis Ángel Maté (ESP)	Cofidis	+ 3h 18' 11"
131	Jean-Marc Marino (FRA)	Saur–Sojasun	+ 3h 18' 20"
132	Marcel Sieberg (GER)	Lotto–Belisol	+ 3h 19' 36"
133	Cédric Pineau (FRA)	FDJ–BigMat	+ 3h 20' 24"
134	Pablo Urtasun (ESP)	Euskaltel–Euskadi	+ 3h 21' 34"
135	Roy Curvers (NED)	Argos–Shimano	+ 3h 23' 44"
136	Cyril Lemoine (FRA)	Saur–Sojasun	+ 3h 23' 55"
137	Jonathan Cantwell (AUS)	Saxo Bank–Tinkoff Bank	+ 3h 25' 08"
138	Yann Huguet (FRA)	Argos–Shimano	+ 3h 26' 43"
139	Yohann Gène (FRA)	Team Europcar	+ 3h 26' 58"
140	Juan José Haedo (ARG)	Saxo Bank–Tinkoff Bank	+ 3h 27' 28"
141	Patrick Gretsch (GER)	Argos–Shimano	+ 3h 28' 36"
142	Mark Cavendish (GBR)	Team Sky	+ 3h 27' 49"
143	Karsten Kroon (NED)	Saxo Bank–Tinkoff Bank	+ 3h 28' 56"
144	Bram Tankink (NED)	Rabobank	+ 3h 31' 24"
145	Aleksandr Kuschynski (BLR)	Team Katusha	+ 3h 38' 24"
146	Bernhard Eisel (AUT)	Team Sky	+ 3h 38' 48"
147	Johan Vansummeren (BEL)	Garmin–Sharp	+ 3h 40' 01"
148	Albert Timmer (NED)	Argos–Shimano	+ 3h 40' 37"
149	Julien Fouchard (FRA)	Cofidis	+ 3h 42' 31"
150	Sebastian Langeveld (NED)	Orica–GreenEDGE	+ 3h 50' 12"
151	Tyler Farrar (USA)	Garmin–Sharp	+ 3h 54' 45"
152	Jan Ghyselinck (BEL)	Cofidis	+ 3h 57' 04"
153	Jimmy Engoulvent (FRA)	Saur–Sojasun	+ 3h 57' 36"

=== Points classification ===
Final points classification (1–10)
Rank	Rider	Team	Points
1	Peter Sagan (SVK)	Liquigas–Cannondale	421
2	André Greipel (GER)	Lotto–Belisol	280
3	Matthew Goss (AUS)	Orica–GreenEDGE	268
4	Mark Cavendish (GBR)	Team Sky	220
5	Edvald Boasson Hagen (NOR)	Team Sky	160
6	Bradley Wiggins (GBR)	Team Sky	144
7	Chris Froome (GBR)	Team Sky	126
8	Luis León Sánchez (ESP)	Rabobank	104
9	Juan José Haedo (ARG)	Saxo Bank–Tinkoff Bank	102
10	Cadel Evans (AUS)	BMC Racing Team	100

=== Mountains classification ===
Final mountains classification (1–10)
Rank	Rider	Team	Points
1	Thomas Voeckler (FRA)	Team Europcar	135
2	Fredrik Kessiakoff (SWE)	Astana	123
3	Chris Anker Sørensen (DEN)	Saxo Bank–Tinkoff Bank	77
4	Pierre Rolland (FRA)	Team Europcar	63
5	Alejandro Valverde (ESP)	Movistar Team	51
6	Chris Froome (GBR)	Team Sky	48
7	Egoi Martínez (ESP)	Euskaltel–Euskadi	43
8	Thibaut Pinot (FRA)	FDJ–BigMat	40
9	Brice Feillu (FRA)	Saur–Sojasun	38
10	Dan Martin (IRL)	Garmin–Sharp	34

=== Young rider classification ===
Final young rider classification (1–10)
Rank	Rider	Team	Time
1	Tejay van Garderen (USA)	BMC Racing Team	87h 45′ 51"
2	Thibaut Pinot (FRA)	FDJ–BigMat	+ 6' 13"
3	Steven Kruijswijk (NED)	Rabobank	+ 1h 05' 48"
4	Rein Taaramäe (EST)	Cofidis	+ 1h 16' 48"
5	Gorka Izagirre (ESP)	Euskaltel–Euskadi	+ 1h 21' 15"
6	Rafael Valls (ESP)	Vacansoleil–DCM	+ 1h 26' 53"
7	Peter Sagan (SVK)	Liquigas–Cannondale	+ 1h 27' 33"
8	Dominik Nerz (GER)	Liquigas–Cannondale	+ 1h 31' 08"
9	Edvald Boasson Hagen (NOR)	Team Sky	+ 1h 41' 30"
10	Davide Malacarne (ITA)	Team Europcar	+ 1h 46' 41"

=== Team classification ===
Final team classification (1–10)
Rank	Team	Time
1	(Luxembourg) RadioShack–Nissan	263h 12' 14"
2	(United Kingdom) Team Sky	+ 5' 46"
3	(United States) BMC Racing Team	+ 36' 29"
4	(Kazakhstan) Astana	+ 43' 22"
5	(Italy) Liquigas–Cannondale	+ 1h 04' 55"
6	(Spain) Movistar Team	+ 1h 08' 16"
7	(France) Team Europcar	+ 1h 08' 46"
8	Team Katusha	+ 1h 12' 46"
9	(France) FDJ–BigMat	+ 1h 19' 30"
10	(France) Ag2r–La Mondiale	+ 1h 41' 15"

== UCI World Tour rankings ==
Riders from the ProTeams competing individually, as well as for their teams and nations, for points that contributed towards the World Tour rankings. Points were awarded to the top twenty finishers in the general classification and to the top five finishers in each stage. Wiggins moved into the lead of the individual ranking, with Joaquim Rodríguez dropping to second. The points accrued by Chris Froome moved him from 52nd to 6th. Team Sky retained their lead in the team ranking, ahead of second-place Liquigas–Cannondale. Spain remained as the leaders of the nation ranking, with Italy second.

UCI World Tour individual ranking on 22 July 2012 (1–10)
Rank	Prev.	Name	Team	Points
1	3	Bradley Wiggins (GBR)	Team Sky	601
2	1	Joaquim Rodríguez (ESP)	Team Katusha	404
3	4	Vincenzo Nibali (ITA)	Liquigas–Cannondale	400
4	2	Tom Boonen (BEL)	Omega Pharma–Quick-Step	368
5	5	Peter Sagan (SVK)	Liquigas–Cannondale	351
6	52	Chris Froome (GBR)	Team Sky	266
7	6	Samuel Sánchez (ESP)	Euskaltel–Euskadi	252
8	23	Jurgen Van den Broeck (BEL)	Lotto–Belisol	237
9	7	Simon Gerrans (AUS)	Orica–GreenEDGE	210
10	15	Alejandro Valverde (ESP)	Movistar Team	201

== See also ==
- 2012 in men's road cycling
- 2012 in sports

== Bibliography ==
- Bacon, Ellis (2014). Mapping Le Tour. London: HarperCollins. ISBN 978-0-00-754399-1.
- Liggett, Phil; Raia, James; Lewis, Sammarye (2005). Tour de France for Dummies. Indianapolis, IN: John Wiley & Sons. ISBN 978-0-7645-8449-7.
- McGann, Bill; McGann, Carol (2008). The Story of the Tour de France, volume 2: 1965–2007. Indianapolis, IN: Dog Ear Publishing. ISBN 978-1-59858-608-4.
- Race regulations (PDF). Tour de France. Paris: Amaury Sport Organisation. 2012. Archived from the original (PDF) on 14 July 2015.
- UCI cycling regulations. Part 2, road races. Aigle, Switzerland: Union Cycliste Internationale. 1 February 2012. Archived from the original on 22 February 2012.
