= Les Sybelles =

Ski area in the French Alps

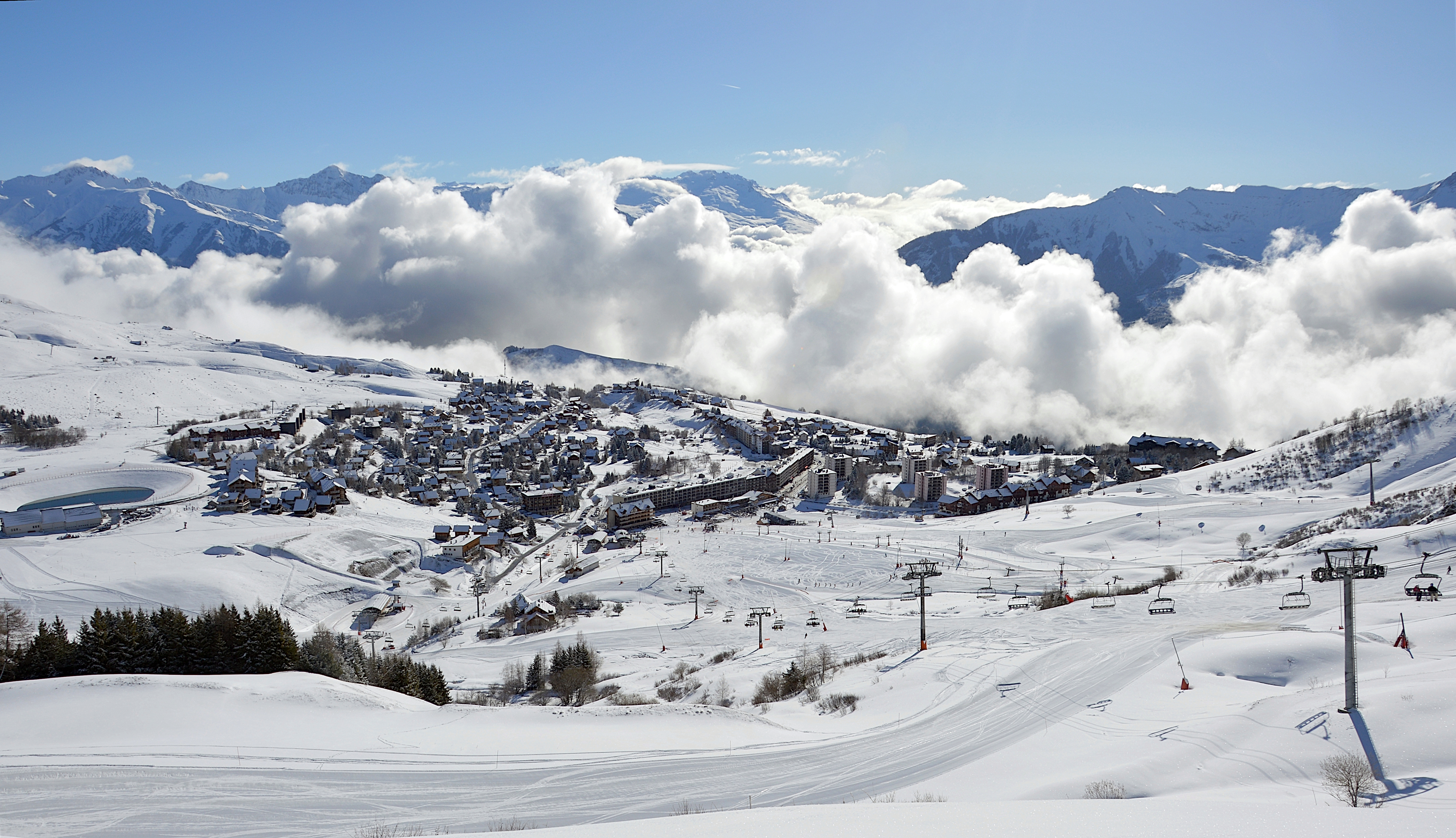
- La Toussuire

- Location within France Location within Auvergne-Rhône-Alpes Location within Alps
- Location: Fontcouverte-la Toussuire, Savoie
- Nearest city: Saint-Jean-de-Maurienne
- Coordinates: 45°15′17″N 6°15′31″E
- Top elevation: 2,620 m (8,596 ft)
- Base elevation: 1,100 m (3,609 ft)
- Trails: 136
- Lift system: 68
- Website: Official website

Les Sybelles (French pronunciation: [le sibɛl]) is a ski area located in the Savoie department of the French Alps. It consists of six connected resorts, totalling 136 trails and 68 lifts.

== History ==
The ski area was formed in 2003 by Gaston Maulin, uniting 6 ski resorts into a single ski area.

The resort was the home base of Jean-Pierre Vidal, winner of the gold medal in slalom at the 2002 Winter Olympics in Salt Lake City. The La Toussuire ski station is also used regularly as the finish of cycle races including the Tour de France and the Critérium du Dauphiné.

== Terrain ==
- 20 green slopes
- 40 blue slopes
- 31 red slopes
- 5 black slopes
- 310 km (193 mi) slopes total
- 2 snowparks

== Resorts ==
The following resorts are part of Les Sybelles and connected with each other.

- La Toussuire
- Saint-Sorlin-d'Arves
- Saint-Jean-d'Arves
- Le Corbier
- Les Bottières
- Saint-Colomban-des-Villards
