= Saint-Jean-d'Arves =

Commune in France

- Commune
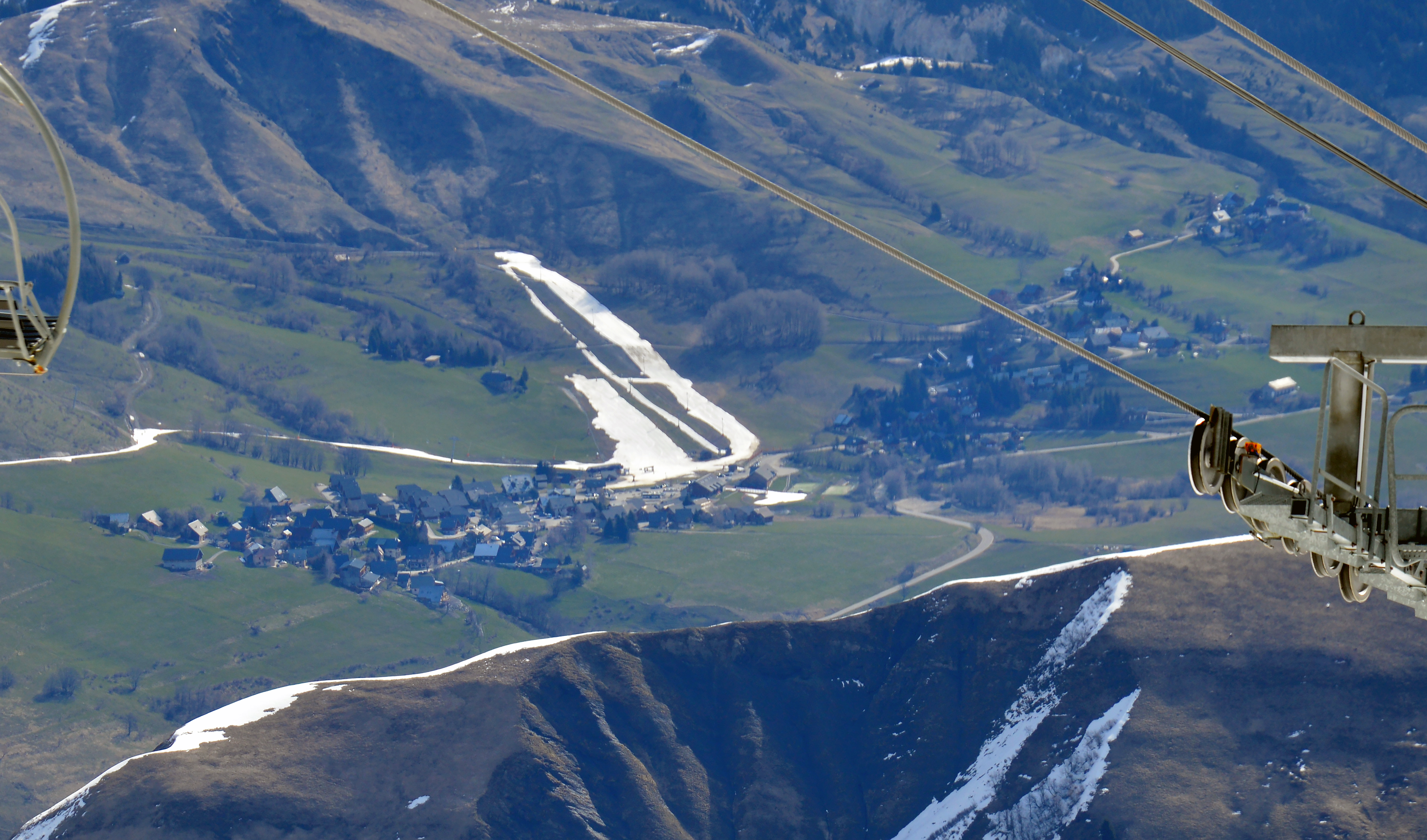
- View of the village from the heights of Saint-Sorlin-d'Arves
- Location of Saint-Jean-d'Arves
- Location within France Location within Auvergne-Rhône-Alpes
- Coordinates: 45°12′29″N 6°16′26″E
- Country: France
- Region: Auvergne-Rhône-Alpes
- Department: Savoie
- Arrondissement: Saint-Jean-de-Maurienne
- Canton: Saint-Jean-de-Maurienne

Government
  - Mayor (2020–2026): Christiane Hustache
- Area^{1}: 75.6 km^{2} (29.2 sq mi)
- Elevation: 1,550 m (5,090 ft)
- Highest elevation: 3,504 m (11,496 ft)
- Lowest elevation: 977 m (3,205 ft)
- Population (2023): 273
  - Density: 3.61/km^{2} (9.35/sq mi)
- Time zone: UTC+01:00 (CET)
  - Summer (DST): UTC+02:00 (CEST)
- INSEE/Postal code: 73242 /73530
- ^{1} French Land Register data, which excludes lakes, ponds, glaciers > 1 km^{2} (0.386 sq mi or 247 acres) and river estuaries.

Saint-Jean-d'Arves (French pronunciation: [sɛ̃ ʒɑ̃ daʁv]; Arpitan: Sant-Jian-d’Ârva) is a commune in the Savoie department in the Auvergne-Rhône-Alpes region in south-eastern France.

It is a ski resort, part of the larger Les Sybelles ski area.

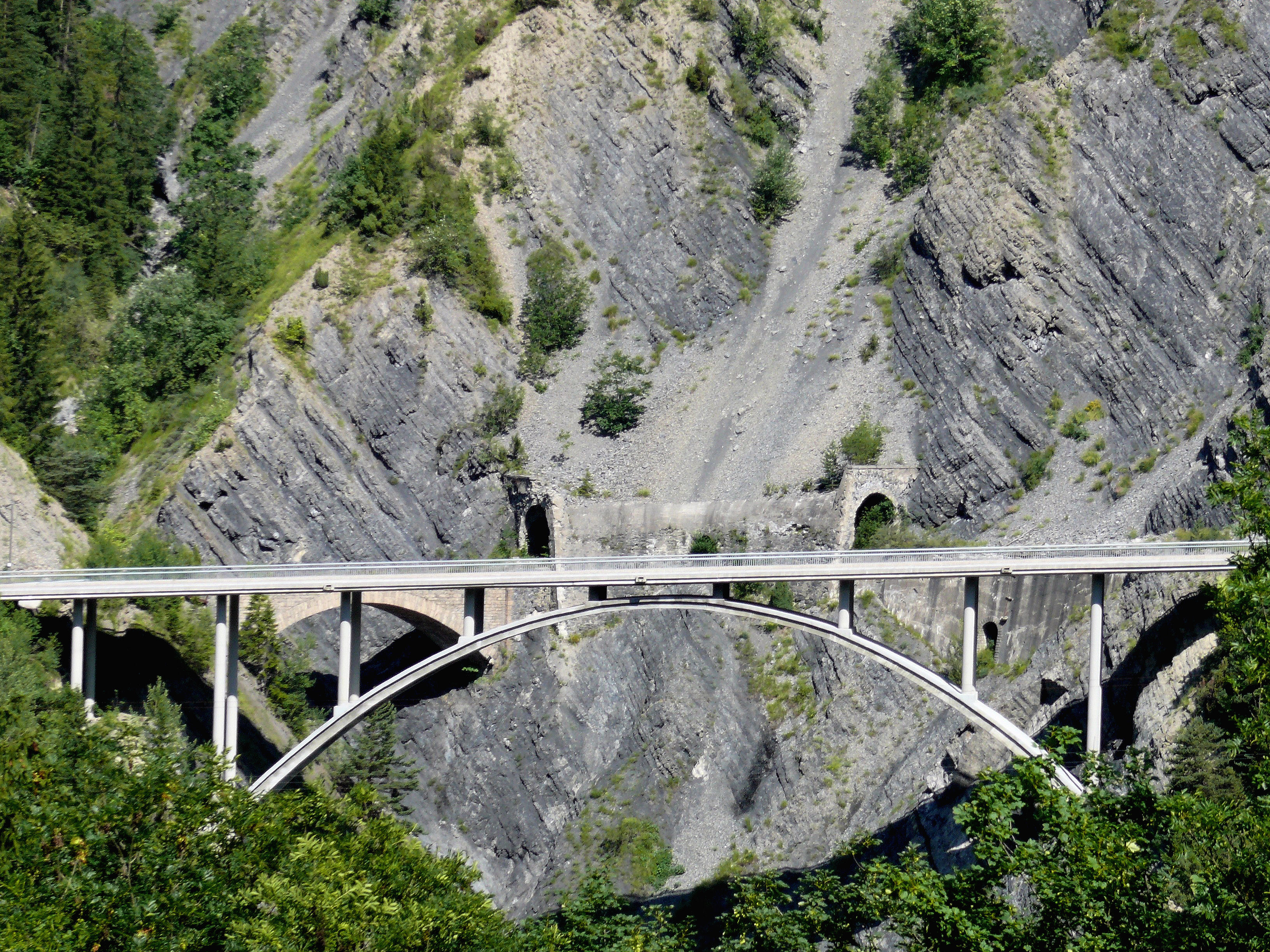
The Sallanches Viaduct, in Saint-Jean-d'Arves

== See also ==
- Communes of the Savoie department
