= 2008 Critérium du Dauphiné Libéré =

2008 UCI ProTour, race 8 of 15

Race details
- Dates: 8–15 June 2008
- Stages: 7 & Prologue
- Distance: 1,093.6 km (679.5 mi)
- Winning time: 27h 34' 39"

Results
Jersey awarded to the overall winner	Winner	Alejandro Valverde (ESP)	(Caisse d'Epargne)
	Second	Cadel Evans (AUS)	(Silence–Lotto)
	Third	Levi Leipheimer (USA)	(Astana)
Jersey awarded to the points classification winner	Points	Alejandro Valverde (ESP)	(Caisse d'Epargne)
Jersey awarded to the mountains classification winner	Mountains	Pierre Rolland (FRA)	(Crédit Agricole)
	Team	(Spain) Euskaltel–Euskadi	

The 2008 Critérium du Dauphiné Libéré was the 60th edition of the Critérium du Dauphiné Libéré cycle race and was held from 8 June to 15 June 2005. The race started in Le Pontet and finished in Grenoble. The race was won by Spanish rider Alejandro Valverde of the Caisse d'Epargne team.

== Teams ==
Eighteen UCI ProTour teams, each containing a maximum of eight riders, participated in the 2008 Critérium du Dauphiné Libéré:

Belgium

- Quick-Step (QST)
- Silence–Lotto (SIL)

Denmark

- Team CSC (CSC)

France

- Ag2r–La Mondiale (ALM)
- Bouygues Télécom (BTL)
- Cofidis (COF)
- Crédit Agricole (C.A)
- Française des Jeux (FDJ)

Germany

- Gerolsteiner (GST)
- Team Milram (MRM)

Italy

- Lampre (LAM)
- Liquigas (LIQ)

Luxembourg

- Astana (AST)

Netherlands

- Rabobank (RAB)

Spain

- Caisse d'Epargne (GCE)
- Euskaltel–Euskadi (EUS)
- Saunier Duval–Scott (SDV)

United States

- Team High Road (THR)

== Route ==
Stage characteristics and winners
Stage	Date	Course	Distance	Type	Winner
P	8 June	Le Pontet to Avignon	5.6 km (3.5 mi)	Individual time trial	Levi Leipheimer (USA)
1	9 June	Avignon to Privas	194 km (121 mi)		Alejandro Valverde (ESP)
2	10 June	Bourg-Saint-Andéol to Vienne	184 km (114 mi)		George Hincapie (USA)
3	11 June	Saint-Paul-en-Jarez	31 km (19 mi)	Individual time trial	Alejandro Valverde (ESP)
4	12 June	Vienne to Annemasse	193 km (120 mi)		Cyril Dessel (FRA)
5	13 June	Ville-la-Grand to Morzine	125 km (78 mi)		Yuri Trofimov (RUS)
6	14 June	Morzine to La Toussuire	233 km (145 mi)		Chris Anker Sørensen (DEN)
7	15 June	Saint-Jean-de-Maurienne to Grenoble	128 km (80 mi)		Dmitry Fofonov (KAZ)

== Stages ==
=== Prologue ===
8 June 2008 – Le Pontet to Avignon, 5.6 km (3.5 mi) (ITT)

Prologue Results

Rank	Rider	Team	Time
1	Levi Leipheimer (USA)	Astana	6' 10"
2	Thor Hushovd (NOR)	Crédit Agricole	+ 1"
3	Alejandro Valverde (ESP)	Caisse d'Epargne	+ 6"
4	Maxime Monfort (BEL)	Cofidis	+ 12"
5	Vladimir Efimkin (RUS)	Ag2r–La Mondiale	+ 12"

General Classification after Prologue

Rank	Rider	Team	Time
1	Levi Leipheimer (USA)	Astana	6' 10"
2	Thor Hushovd (NOR)	Crédit Agricole	+ 1"
3	Alejandro Valverde (ESP)	Caisse d'Epargne	+ 6"
4	Maxime Monfort (BEL)	Cofidis	+ 12"
5	Vladimir Efimkin (RUS)	Ag2r–La Mondiale	+ 12"

=== Stage 1 ===
9 June 2008 – Avignon to Privas, 194 km (121 mi)

Stage 1 Results

Rank	Rider	Team	Time
1	Alejandro Valverde (ESP)	Caisse d'Epargne	4h 46' 36"
2	Thor Hushovd (NOR)	Crédit Agricole	s.t.
3	Björn Schröder (GER)	Team Milram	s.t.
4	Fabian Wegmann (GER)	Gerolsteiner	s.t.
5	Cadel Evans (AUS)	Silence–Lotto	s.t.

General Classification after Stage 1

Rank	Rider	Team	Time
1	Thor Hushovd (NOR)	Crédit Agricole	4h 52' 41"
2	Alejandro Valverde (ESP)	Caisse d'Epargne	+ 1"
3	Levi Leipheimer (USA)	Astana	+ 5"
4	Maxime Monfort (BEL)	Cofidis	+ 17"
5	Vladimir Efimkin (RUS)	Ag2r–La Mondiale	+ 17"

=== Stage 2 ===
10 June 2008 – Bourg-Saint-Andéol to Vienne, 184 km (114 mi)

Stage 2 Results

Rank	Rider	Team	Time
1	George Hincapie (USA)	Team High Road	4h 32' 38"
2	Sebastien Chavanel (FRA)	Française des Jeux	s.t.
3	Sebastian Lang (GER)	Gerolsteiner	s.t.
4	Heinrich Haussler (GER)	Gerolsteiner	s.t.
5	Thor Hushovd (NOR)	Crédit Agricole	s.t.

General Classification after Stage 2

Rank	Rider	Team	Time
1	Thor Hushovd (NOR)	Crédit Agricole	9h 25' 19"
2	Alejandro Valverde (ESP)	Caisse d'Epargne	+ 1"
3	Levi Leipheimer (USA)	Astana	+ 5"
4	George Hincapie (USA)	Team High Road	+ 13"
5	Maxime Monfort (BEL)	Cofidis	+ 17"

=== Stage 3 ===
11 June 2008 – Saint-Paul-en-Jarez to Saint-Paul-en-Jarez, 31 km (19 mi) (ITT)

Stage 3 Results

Rank	Rider	Team	Time
1	Alejandro Valverde (ESP)	Caisse d'Epargne	44' 59"
2	Levi Leipheimer (USA)	Astana	+ 19"
3	Cadel Evans (AUS)	Silence–Lotto	+ 20"
4	Mikel Astarloza (ESP)	Euskaltel–Euskadi	+ 1' 00"
5	Maxime Monfort (BEL)	Cofidis	+ 1' 01"

General Classification after Stage 3

Rank	Rider	Team	Time
1	Alejandro Valverde (ESP)	Caisse d'Epargne	10h 10' 19"
2	Levi Leipheimer (USA)	Astana	+ 23"
3	Cadel Evans (AUS)	Silence–Lotto	+ 37"
4	Maxime Monfort (BEL)	Cofidis	+ 1' 17"
5	Mikel Astarloza (ESP)	Euskaltel–Euskadi	+ 1' 20"

=== Stage 4 ===
12 June 2008 – Vienne to Annemasse, 193 km (120 mi)

Stage 4 Results

Rank	Rider	Team	Time
1	Cyril Dessel (FRA)	Ag2r–La Mondiale	4h 37' 16"
2	Pierre Rolland (FRA)	Crédit Agricole	+ 18"
3	Amaël Moinard (FRA)	Cofidis	+ 1' 21"
4	Óscar Pereiro (ESP)	Caisse d'Epargne	+ 1' 21"
5	Lars Bak (DEN)	Team CSC	+ 2' 07"

General Classification after Stage 4

Rank	Rider	Team	Time
1	Alejandro Valverde (ESP)	Caisse d'Epargne	14h 49' 46"
2	Levi Leipheimer (USA)	Astana	+ 23"
3	Cadel Evans (AUS)	Silence–Lotto	+ 37"
4	Cyril Dessel (FRA)	Ag2r–La Mondiale	+ 1' 08"
5	Maxime Monfort (BEL)	Cofidis	+ 1' 17"

=== Stage 5 ===
13 June 2008 – Ville-la-Grand to Morzine, 125 km (78 mi)

Stage 5 Results

Rank	Rider	Team	Time
1	Iouri Trofimov (RUS)	Bouygues Télécom	3h 07' 46"
2	Cadel Evans (AUS)	Silence–Lotto	+ 18"
3	Alejandro Valverde (ESP)	Caisse d'Epargne	+ 18"
4	Haimar Zubeldia (ESP)	Euskaltel–Euskadi	+ 23"
5	Sylwester Szmyd (POL)	Lampre	+ 26"

General Classification after Stage 5

Rank	Rider	Team	Time
1	Alejandro Valverde (ESP)	Caisse d'Epargne	17h 57' 50"
2	Cadel Evans (AUS)	Silence–Lotto	+ 37"
3	Levi Leipheimer (USA)	Astana	+ 1' 29"
4	Iouri Trofimov (RUS)	Bouygues Télécom	+ 2' 16"
5	Robert Gesink (NED)	Rabobank	+ 2' 36"

=== Stage 6 ===
14 June 2008 – Morzine to La Toussuire, 233 km (145 mi)

Stage 6 Results

Rank	Rider	Team	Time
1	Chris Anker Sørensen (DEN)	Team CSC	6h 15' 53"
2	Pierrick Fédrigo (FRA)	Bouygues Télécom	+ 1' 02"
3	Levi Leipheimer (USA)	Astana	+ 1' 10"
4	Sylwester Szmyd (POL)	Lampre	+ 1' 15"
5	Alejandro Valverde (ESP)	Caisse d'Epargne	+ 1' 15"

General Classification after Stage 6

Rank	Rider	Team	Time
1	Alejandro Valverde (ESP)	Caisse d'Epargne	24h 14' 58"
2	Cadel Evans (AUS)	Silence–Lotto	+ 39"
3	Levi Leipheimer (USA)	Astana	+ 1' 24"
4	Robert Gesink (NED)	Rabobank	+ 2' 47"
5	Haimar Zubeldia (ESP)	Euskaltel–Euskadi	+ 3' 19"

=== Stage 7 ===
15 June 2008 – Saint-Jean-de-Maurienne to Grenoble, 128 km (80 mi)

Stage 7 Results

Rank	Rider	Team	Time
1	Dmitry Fofonov (KAZ)	Crédit Agricole	3h 17' 20"
2	Jurgen Van de Walle (BEL)	Quick-Step	s.t.
3	Iouri Trofimov (RUS)	Bouygues Télécom	s.t.
4	Christophe Riblon (FRA)	Ag2r–La Mondiale	+ 11"
5	Matteo Carrara (ITA)	Quick-Step	+ 11"

== General Classification ==
	Cyclist	Team	Time
1	Alejandro Valverde (ESP)	Caisse d'Epargne	27h 34' 39"
2	Cadel Evans (AUS)	Silence–Lotto	+ 39"
3	Levi Leipheimer (USA)	Astana	+ 1' 24"
4	Robert Gesink (NED)	Rabobank	+ 2' 47"
5	Haimar Zubeldia (ESP)	Euskaltel–Euskadi	+ 3' 19"
6	Cyril Dessel (FRA)	Ag2r–La Mondiale	+ 4' 01"
7	Mikel Astarloza (ESP)	Euskaltel–Euskadi	+ 4' 25"
8	Sylvester Szmyd (POL)	Lampre	+ 4' 29"
9	Maxime Monfort (BEL)	Cofidis	+ 4' 46"
10	Matteo Carrara (ITA)	Quick-Step	+ 5' 13"

== Jersey progress ==
Stage	Winner	General classification	Mountains classification	Points classification	Team Classification
P	Levi Leipheimer	Levi Leipheimer	no award	Levi Leipheimer	Astana
1	Alejandro Valverde	Thor Hushovd	Christian Kux	Alejandro Valverde	Astana
2	George Hincapie	Thor Hushovd	David de la Fuente	Thor Hushovd	Astana
3	Alejandro Valverde	Alejandro Valverde	Alejandro Valverde	Alejandro Valverde	Caisse d'Epargne
4	Cyril Dessel	Alejandro Valverde	David de la Fuente	Alejandro Valverde	Caisse d'Epargne
5	Iouri Trofimov	Alejandro Valverde	Juan José Cobo	Alejandro Valverde	Silence–Lotto
6	Chris Anker Sørensen	Alejandro Valverde	Pierre Rolland	Alejandro Valverde	Euskaltel–Euskadi
7	Dmitry Fofonov	Alejandro Valverde	Pierre Rolland	Alejandro Valverde	Euskaltel–Euskadi
Final		Alejandro Valverde	Pierre Rolland	Alejandro Valverde	Euskaltel–Euskadi

Jersey wearers when one rider is leading two or more competitions

- In stage 1, Thor Hushovd wore the green jersey
- In stage 3, Alejandro Valverde wore the green jersey
- In stages 4–7, Levi Leipheimer wore the green jersey

== ProTour standings ==
As of 15 June 2008, after the 2008 Critérium du Dauphiné Libéré.

Rank	Name	Team	Points
1	Cadel Evans (AUS)	Silence–Lotto	85
2	Alejandro Valverde (ESP)	Caisse d'Epargne	83
3	Damiano Cunego (ITA)	Lampre	73
4	André Greipel (GER)	Team High Road	62
5	Mikel Astarloza (ESP)	Euskaltel–Euskadi	60
6	Alberto Contador (ESP)	Astana	58
7	Thomas Dekker (NED)	Rabobank	54
8	Andreas Klöden (GER)	Astana	53
9	Stijn Devolder (BEL)	Quick-Step	50
10	José Joaquín Rojas (ESP)	Caisse d'Epargne	45
11	Haimar Zubeldia (ESP)	Euskaltel–Euskadi	45
12	Levi Leipheimer (USA)	Astana	41

- 91 riders have scored at least one point on the 2008 UCI ProTour.

== See also ==
- 2008 in road cycling
