= La Toussuire =

Ski resort in France

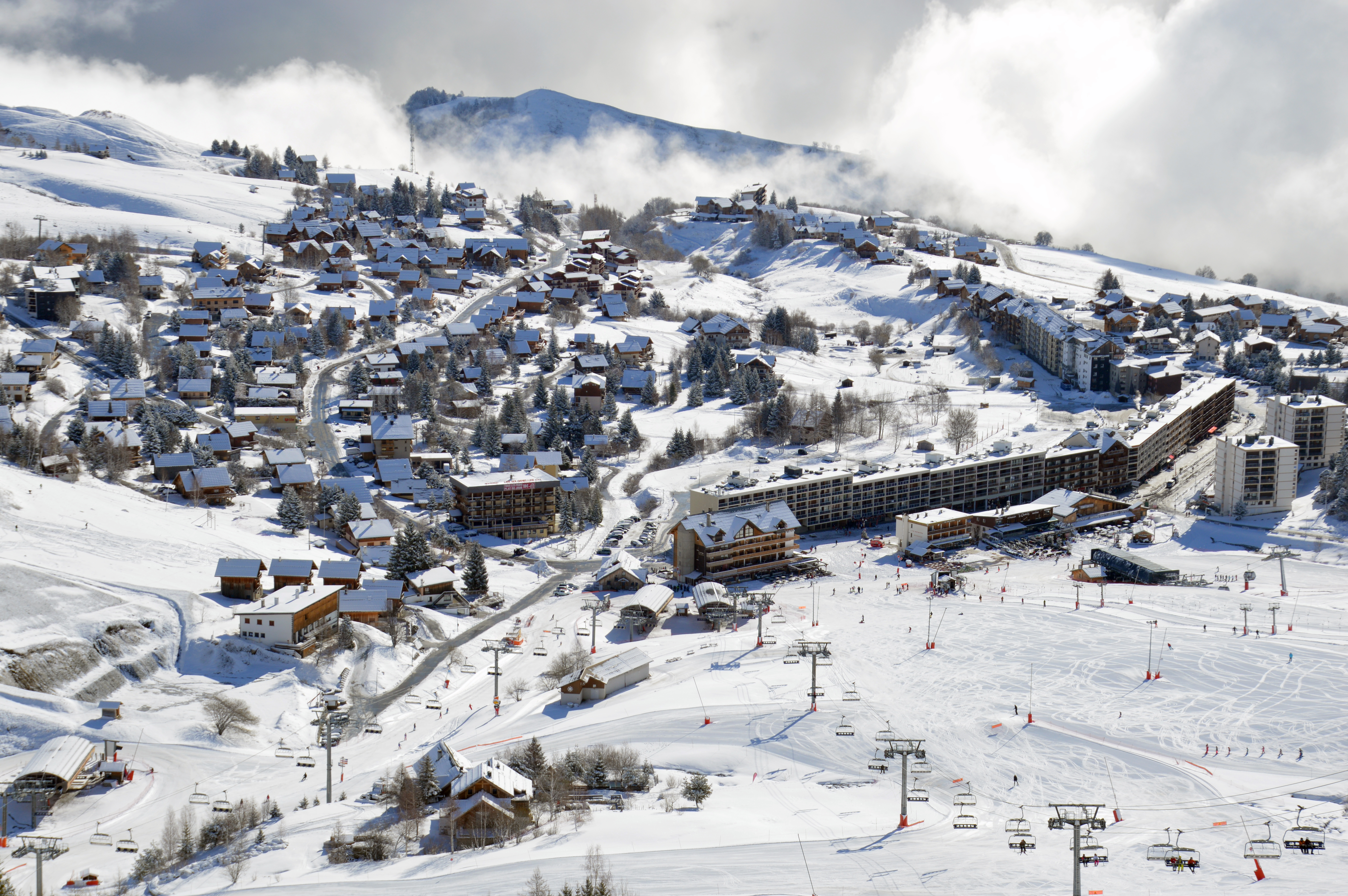

- Location within France Location within Auvergne-Rhône-Alpes Location within Alps
- Location: Fontcouverte-la-Toussuire, Savoie, Auvergne-Rhône-Alpes, France
- Nearest city: Chambéry
- Coordinates: 45°14′50″N 6°18′11″E
- Opened: 1923
- Top elevation: 2,431 m (7,976 ft)
- Base elevation: 1,680 m (5,510 ft)
- Skiable area: 55 km (34 mi) of runs
- Trails: 33; 4 beginner 11 easy 17 intermediate 1 difficult
- Website: la-toussuire.com/en/

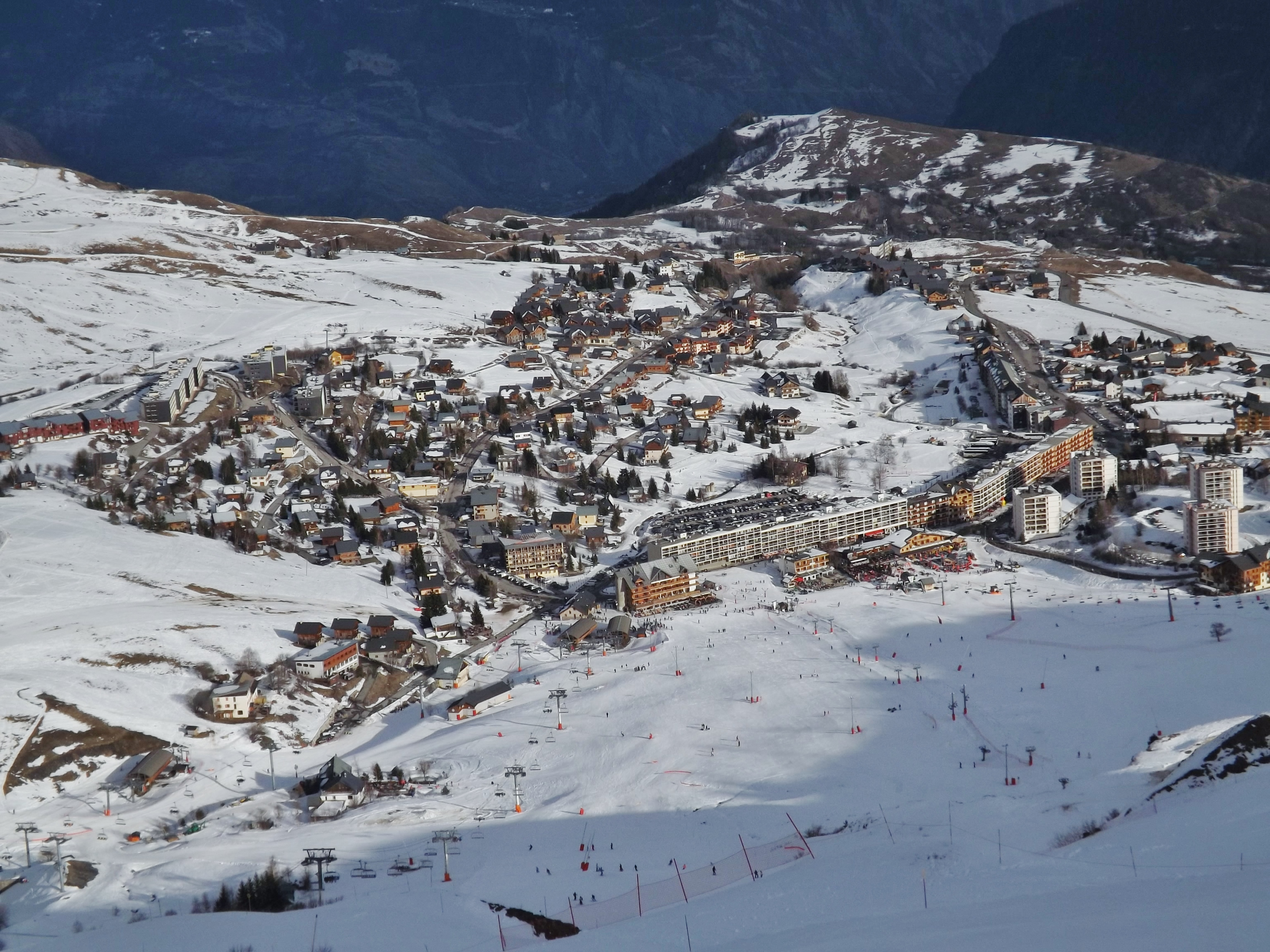
Village of La Toussuire (2016)

La Toussuire (French pronunciation: [la tusɥiʁ]) is a ski resort in the Maurienne Valley, located in the commune of Fontcouverte-la-Toussuire, in the Savoie department in the Auvergne-Rhône-Alpes region. It is a part of the six connected resorts of Les Sybelles, one of the largest ski areas in Europe.

The station was opened in 1923. It is also used regularly as the finish of cycle races including the Tour de France and the Critérium du Dauphiné.

== Cycle racing ==
The 16th stage of the 2006 Tour de France arrived in La Toussuire as did Stage 11 of the 2012 Tour and Stage 19 of the 2015 Tour. The first of two L'Étape du Tours followed the route of Stage 11 on 8 July 2012 with a finish at La Toussuire – Les Sybelles.

=== Details of the climb ===
The climb to the ski-station is accessed from Saint-Jean-de-Maurienne via the D929 and the D78, with the finish line at 1,705 m (5,594 ft). From this direction the climb is 18 km (11.2 mi) with a height gain of 1,095 m (3,593 ft). at an average of 6.1%. There is a shorter and steeper route via Saint-Pancrace (17.6 km (10.9 mi) at 6.5%).

=== Tour de France winners ===
Year	Stage	Start of stage	Distance	Category of climb	Stage winner	Yellow jersey
2015	19	Saint-Jean-de-Maurienne	138 km (86 mi)	1	Vincenzo Nibali (ITA)	Chris Froome (GBR)
2012	11	Albertville	148 km (92 mi)	1	Pierre Rolland (FRA)	Bradley Wiggins (GBR)
2006	16	Bourg-d'Oisans	182 km (113 mi)	1	Michael Rasmussen (DEN)	Óscar Pereiro (ESP)

=== Critérium du Dauphiné winners ===
Year	Stage	Start of stage	Distance	Stage winner	Yellow jersey
2011	7 (final stage)	Pontcharra	117.5 km (73.0 mi)	Joaquim Rodríguez (ESP)	Bradley Wiggins (GBR)
2008	6	Morzine	233 km (145 mi)	Chris Anker Sørensen (DEN)	Alejandro Valverde (ESP)
2006	6	Briançon	169 km (105 mi)	Iban Mayo (ESP)	~~Levi Leipheimer~~ (USA)

== Activities ==
During winter season, a person can ski on the 55 km (34 mi) of runs, split across 33 different slopes.

During summer season, there is a lot of hikes available.
