= Fontcouverte-la-Toussuire =

Fontcouverte-la-Toussuire Fankuèrta (Savoyard)
- Commune
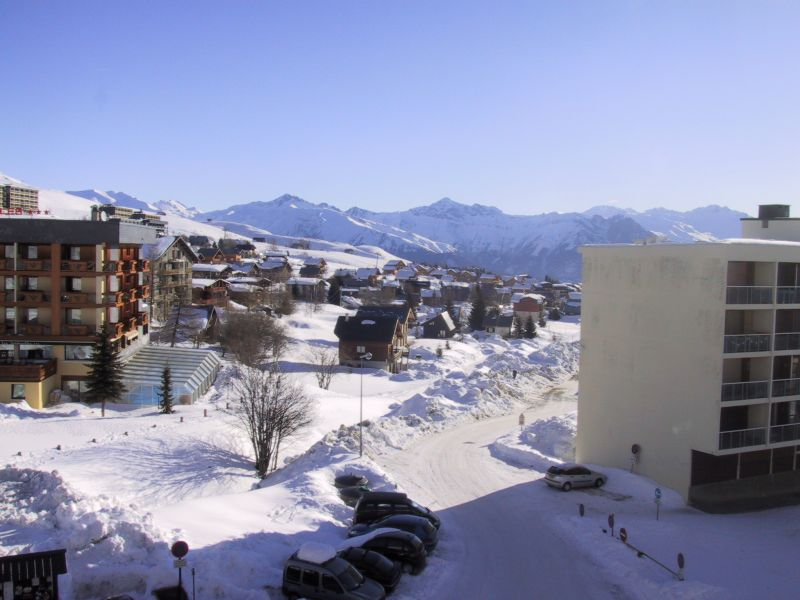
- The ski station of La Toussuire

- Coat of arms
- Location of Fontcouverte-la-Toussuire
- Location within France Location within Auvergne-Rhône-Alpes
- Coordinates: 45°14′50″N 6°18′11″E
- Country: France
- Region: Auvergne-Rhône-Alpes
- Department: Savoie
- Arrondissement: Saint-Jean-de-Maurienne
- Canton: Saint-Jean-de-Maurienne

Government
  - Mayor (2020–2026): Bernard Covarel
- Area^{1}: 21.52 km^{2} (8.31 sq mi)
- Highest elevation: 2,305 m (7,562 ft)
- Lowest elevation: 659 m (2,162 ft)
- Population (2023): 473
  - Density: 22.0/km^{2} (56.9/sq mi)
- Time zone: UTC+01:00 (CET)
  - Summer (DST): UTC+02:00 (CEST)
- INSEE/Postal code: 73116 /73300
- Website: La-toussuire.com
- ^{1} French Land Register data, which excludes lakes, ponds, glaciers > 1 km^{2} (0.386 sq mi or 247 acres) and river estuaries.

Fontcouverte-la-Toussuire (French pronunciation: [fɔ̃kuvɛʁt la tusɥiʁ]; before 1987: Fontcouverte, Savoyard: Fankuèrta) is a commune in the Savoie department in the Auvergne-Rhône-Alpes region in south-eastern France. It contains the ski resort La Toussuire.

== See also ==
- Communes of the Savoie department
