= Saint-Colomban-des-Villards =

Saint-Colomban-des-Villards Lo Vlâr (Savoyard)
- Commune
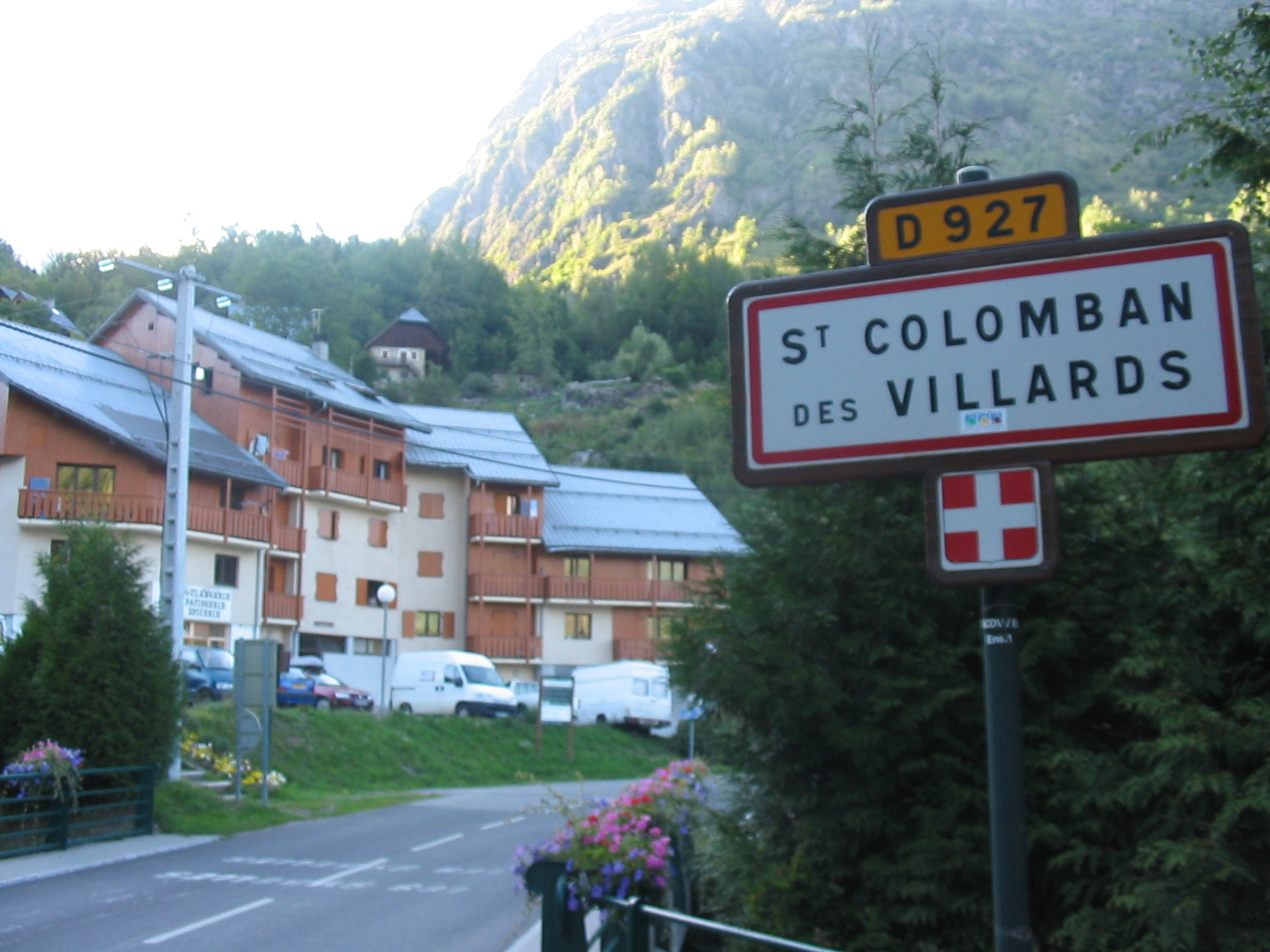
- The road into Saint-Colomban-des-Villards
- Location of Saint-Colomban-des-Villards
- Location within France Location within Auvergne-Rhône-Alpes
- Coordinates: 45°17′42″N 6°13′38″E
- Country: France
- Region: Auvergne-Rhône-Alpes
- Department: Savoie
- Arrondissement: Saint-Jean-de-Maurienne
- Canton: Saint-Jean-de-Maurienne

Government
  - Mayor (2026–32): Stéphan Pezzani
- Area^{1}: 81.12 km^{2} (31.32 sq mi)
- Highest elevation: 2,908 m (9,541 ft)
- Lowest elevation: 955 m (3,133 ft)
- Population (2023): 143
  - Density: 1.76/km^{2} (4.57/sq mi)
- Time zone: UTC+01:00 (CET)
  - Summer (DST): UTC+02:00 (CEST)
- INSEE/Postal code: 73230 /73130
- ^{1} French Land Register data, which excludes lakes, ponds, glaciers > 1 km^{2} (0.386 sq mi or 247 acres) and river estuaries.

Saint-Colomban-des-Villards (French pronunciation: [sɛ̃ kɔlɔ̃bɑ̃ de vilaʁ]; Savoyard: Lo Vlâr, Arpitan: Sent-Colomban-dus-Velârs) is a commune in the Savoie department in the Auvergne-Rhône-Alpes region in south-eastern France.

It is a small ski resort, part of the larger Les Sybelles ski area.

== Geography ==
=== Climate ===
Saint-Colomban-des-Villards has a humid continental climate (Köppen climate classification Dfb) closely bordering on an oceanic climate (Cfb). The average annual temperature in Saint-Colomban-des-Villards is 8.0 °C (46.4 °F). The average annual rainfall is 1,175.0 mm (46.26 in) with November as the wettest month. The temperatures are highest on average in July, at around 16.7 °C (62.1 °F), and lowest in January, at around −0.2 °C (31.6 °F). The highest temperature ever recorded in Saint-Colomban-des-Villards was 32.6 °C (90.7 °F) on 7 July 2015; the coldest temperature ever recorded was −22.0 °C (−7.6 °F) on 9 January 1985.

Climate data for Saint-Colomban-des-Villards (1991−2020 normals, extremes 1984−2020)
Month	Jan	Feb	Mar	Apr	May	Jun	Jul	Aug	Sep	Oct	Nov	Dec	Year
Record high °C (°F)	14.0 (57.2)	16.1 (61.0)	20.5 (68.9)	24.2 (75.6)	28.6 (83.5)	32.6 (90.7)	32.6 (90.7)	32.5 (90.5)	28.3 (82.9)	25.8 (78.4)	20.3 (68.5)	17.0 (62.6)	32.6 (90.7)
Mean daily maximum °C (°F)	3.1 (37.6)	4.2 (39.6)	8.6 (47.5)	12.4 (54.3)	16.3 (61.3)	20.0 (68.0)	22.0 (71.6)	21.5 (70.7)	17.0 (62.6)	12.9 (55.2)	7.1 (44.8)	3.4 (38.1)	12.4 (54.3)
Daily mean °C (°F)	−0.2 (31.6)	0.3 (32.5)	4.1 (39.4)	7.6 (45.7)	11.4 (52.5)	14.8 (58.6)	16.7 (62.1)	16.3 (61.3)	12.4 (54.3)	8.8 (47.8)	3.7 (38.7)	0.4 (32.7)	8.0 (46.4)
Mean daily minimum °C (°F)	−3.5 (25.7)	−3.5 (25.7)	−0.4 (31.3)	2.7 (36.9)	6.5 (43.7)	9.7 (49.5)	11.4 (52.5)	11.2 (52.2)	7.9 (46.2)	4.6 (40.3)	0.3 (32.5)	−2.7 (27.1)	3.7 (38.7)
Record low °C (°F)	−22.0 (−7.6)	−20.3 (−4.5)	−14.8 (5.4)	−7.8 (18.0)	−3.5 (25.7)	−1.2 (29.8)	1.7 (35.1)	1.8 (35.2)	−2.5 (27.5)	−7.0 (19.4)	−13.3 (8.1)	−16.6 (2.1)	−22.0 (−7.6)
Average precipitation mm (inches)	118.2 (4.65)	92.5 (3.64)	92.3 (3.63)	86.6 (3.41)	77.3 (3.04)	87.0 (3.43)	89.4 (3.52)	89.9 (3.54)	91.8 (3.61)	102.5 (4.04)	125.9 (4.96)	121.6 (4.79)	1,175 (46.26)
Average precipitation days (≥ 1.0 mm)	9.8	8.3	9.1	10.2	11.3	11.6	9.8	9.8	9.2	10.4	10.8	10.9	121.0
Source: Météo-France

== See also ==
- Communes of the Savoie department
