= Saint-Sorlin-d'Arves =

Saint-Sorlin-d'Arves Sïn Sorlïn (Savoyard) Sent-Sorlin-d'Ârva (Arpitan)
- Commune
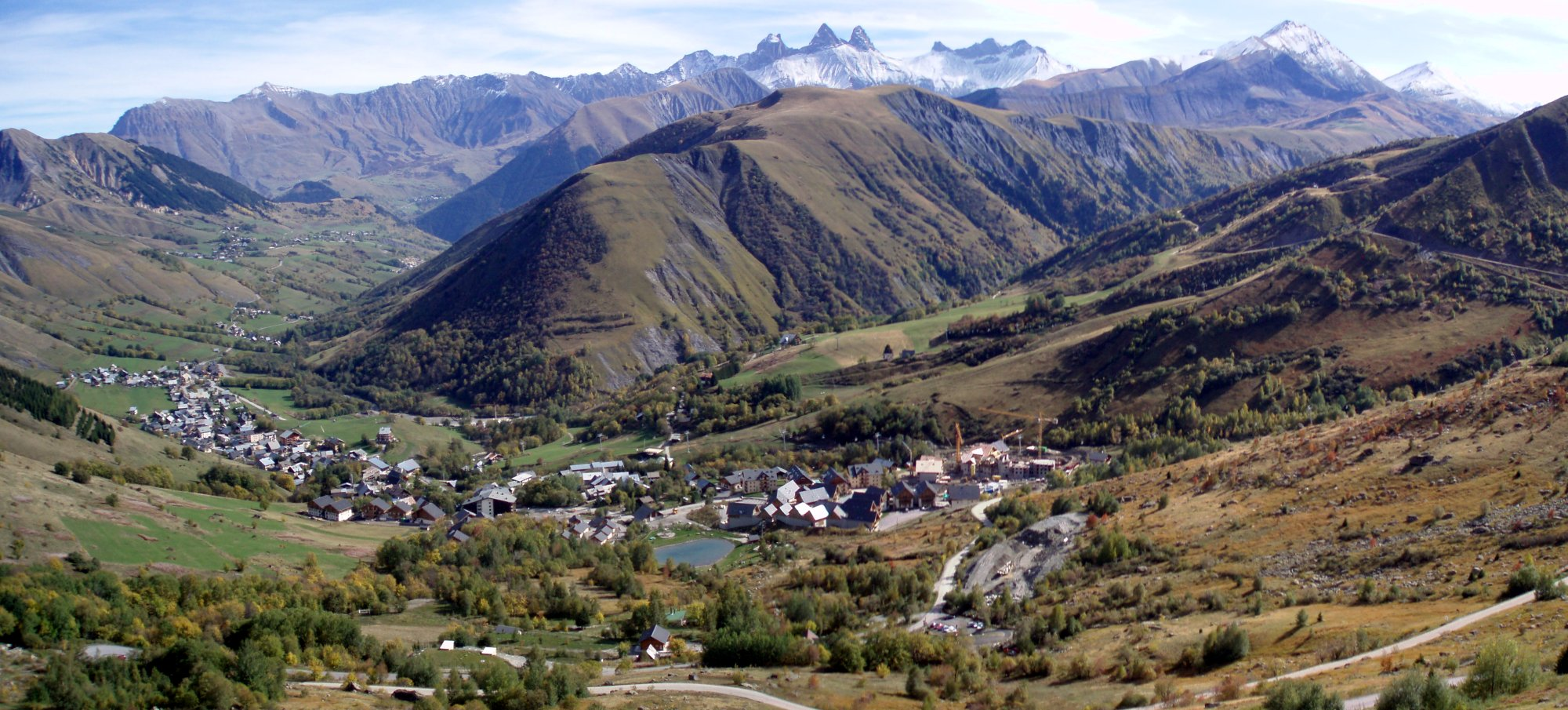
- A general view of Saint-Sorlin-d'Arves

- Coat of arms
- Location of Saint-Sorlin-d'Arves
- Location within France Location within Auvergne-Rhône-Alpes
- Coordinates: 45°13′14″N 6°13′51″E
- Country: France
- Region: Auvergne-Rhône-Alpes
- Department: Savoie
- Arrondissement: Saint-Jean-de-Maurienne
- Canton: Saint-Jean-de-Maurienne
- Intercommunality: Cœur de Maurienne Arvan

Government
  - Mayor (2020–2026): Fabrice Baudray
- Area^{1}: 39 km^{2} (15 sq mi)
- Highest elevation: 3,464 m (11,365 ft)
- Lowest elevation: 1,427 m (4,682 ft)
- Population (2023): 347
  - Density: 8.9/km^{2} (23/sq mi)
- Time zone: UTC+01:00 (CET)
  - Summer (DST): UTC+02:00 (CEST)
- INSEE/Postal code: 73280 /73530
- Website: Saintsorlindarves.com
- ^{1} French Land Register data, which excludes lakes, ponds, glaciers > 1 km^{2} (0.386 sq mi or 247 acres) and river estuaries.

Saint-Sorlin-d'Arves (French pronunciation: [sɛ̃ sɔʁlɛ̃ daʁv]; Arpitan: Sent-Sorlin-d'Ârva, [sin sɔʁˈlin ˈdɑːʁva], Savoyard: Sïn-Sorlïn, [sin sɔʁˈlin]) is a commune in the department of Savoie, in the region of Auvergne-Rhône-Alpes, southeastern France.

Saint-Sorlin is a traditional Maurienne mountain village with some 350 permanent inhabitants. It is positioned in a mountain setting, with its slopes facing the 3000 metre Aiguilles d'Arves and at the foot of the Étendard glacier. Situated between 1550 and 1700 metres it is the highest village on the Col de la Croix de Fer. Made up of 14 hamlets spread over 3 km it has a famous Baroque church, several chapels, a cheese cooperative and a few farms giving it an authentic Savoyard village ambiance. The village has various summer fetes and other activities and regularly features in the Tour de France route. The Col de la Croix de Fer attracts many cyclists and also provides a good starting point for walks to the Trois Lacs and the Étendard Glacier (fishing, picnic sites and mountain viewpoints).

It is a ski resort, part of the larger Les Sybelles area. Gaston Maulin's project of linking St Sorlin with the La Toussuire and Le Corbier ski resorts has created Les Sybelles, an area that ranks high in the list of the largest French ski areas, with over 300 kilometres of intermediate level skiing. The St Sorlin area has over 120 kilometres of pistes and is generally considered to have the best runs and be the best placed sector of the Sybelles area. With village slopes starting at 1550 metres and a current maximum lift altitude of 2620 metres there is normally good snow until the end of April but there are also plenty of strategically placed snow cannons. St Sorlin has a 16 km cross country ski trails, 4 green, 11 blue, 9 red and 2 black runs with beginners slopes in the village.

== See also ==
- Communes of the Savoie department
