= 2015 Tour de France, Stage 12 to Stage 21 =

Cycling competition

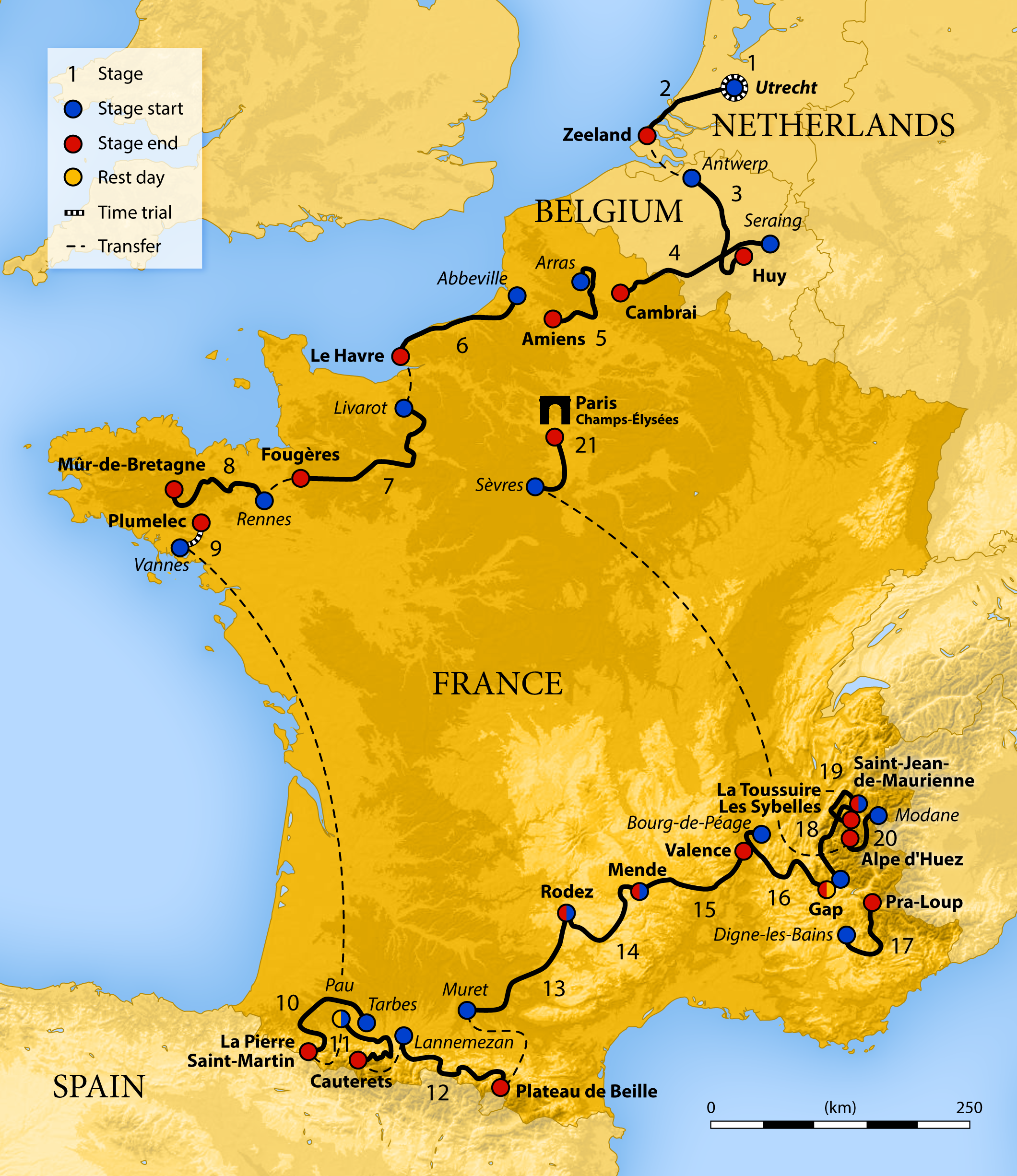
Route of the 2015 Tour de France

The 2015 Tour de France was the 102nd edition of the race, one of cycling's Grand Tours. The Tour started in Utrecht, Netherlands on 4 July and finished on the Champs-Élysées in Paris on 26 July. On 21 July, between stages 16 and 17 there was a rest day in Gap.

== Classification standings ==
Legend
Yellow jersey	Denotes the leader of the general classification	Green jersey	Denotes the leader of the points classification
Polka dot jersey	Denotes the leader of the mountains classification	White jersey	Denotes the leader of the young rider classification
Jersey with a yellow background on the number bib.	Denotes the leader of the team classification	Jersey with a red background on the number bib.	Denotes the winner of the combativity award

== Stage 12 ==
16 July 2015 — Lannemezan to Plateau de Beille, 195 km (121 mi)

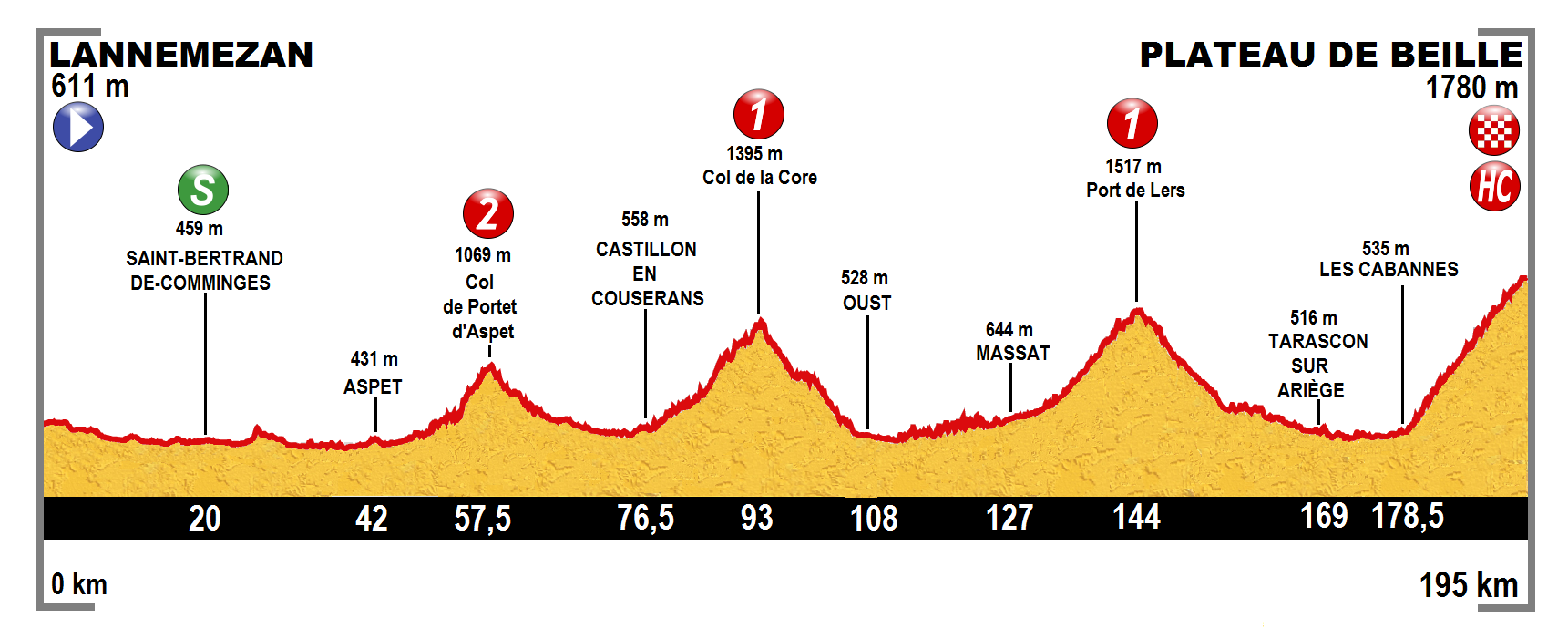
Stage 12 profile

This mountainous stage began in Lannemezan, and headed south-east to an early intermediate sprint at Saint-Bertrand-de-Comminges. The race then continued east through Payssous and Aspet, where it turned south. After the peloton passed through Sengouagnet, the peloton turned east again and the 4.3 kilometres (2.7 mi) climb of the category 2 Col de Portet d'Aspet at 1,069 metres (3,507 ft) began, with an average gradient of 9.7%. The race then descended to Castillon-en-Couserans, which was immediately followed to the south-east by the 14.1 kilometres (8.8 mi) climb of the category 1 Col de la Core at 1,395 metres (4,577 ft), with a gradient of 5.7%. The riders then descended east towards Seix, following the valley through to Massat and, turning south, where the 12.9 kilometres (8.0 mi) climb of the category 1 Port de Lers at 1,517 metres (4,977 ft) began, with an average gradient of 6%. The race then descended to the valley floor at Tarascon-sur-Ariège to the east, which continued to Les Cabannes. The final climb was of the Hors catégorie Plateau de Beille at 1,780 metres (5,840 ft). This was a winding 15.8 kilometres (9.8 mi) climb south from Les Cabannes, with a gradient of 7.9%.

Stage 12 result

Rank	Rider	Team	Time
1	Joaquim Rodríguez (ESP)	Team Katusha	5h 40' 14"
2	Jakob Fuglsang (DEN)	Astana	+ 1' 12"
3	Romain Bardet (FRA)	AG2R La Mondiale	+ 1' 49"
4	Gorka Izagirre (ESP)	Movistar Team	+ 4' 34"
5	Louis Meintjes (RSA)	MTN–Qhubeka	+ 4' 38"
6	Jan Bárta (CZE)	Bora–Argon 18	+ 5' 47"
7	Romain Sicard (FRA)	Team Europcar	+ 6' 03"
8	Mikaël Cherel (FRA)	AG2R La Mondiale	+ 6' 28"
9	Alejandro Valverde (ESP)	Movistar Team	+ 6' 46"
10	Chris Froome (GBR)	Team Sky	+ 6' 47"

General classification after stage 12

Rank	Rider	Team	Time
1	Chris Froome (GBR)	Team Sky	46h 50' 32"
2	Tejay van Garderen (USA)	BMC Racing Team	+ 2' 52"
3	Nairo Quintana (COL)	Movistar Team	+ 3' 09"
4	Alejandro Valverde (ESP)	Movistar Team	+ 3' 58"
5	Geraint Thomas (GBR)	Team Sky	+ 4' 03"
6	Alberto Contador (ESP)	Tinkoff–Saxo	+ 4' 04"
7	Robert Gesink (NED)	LottoNL–Jumbo	+ 5' 32"
8	Tony Gallopin (FRA)	Lotto–Soudal	+ 7' 32"
9	Vincenzo Nibali (ITA)	Astana	+ 7' 47"
10	Bauke Mollema (NED)	Trek Factory Racing	+ 8' 02"

== Stage 13 ==
17 July 2015 — Muret to Rodez, 198.5 km (123 mi)

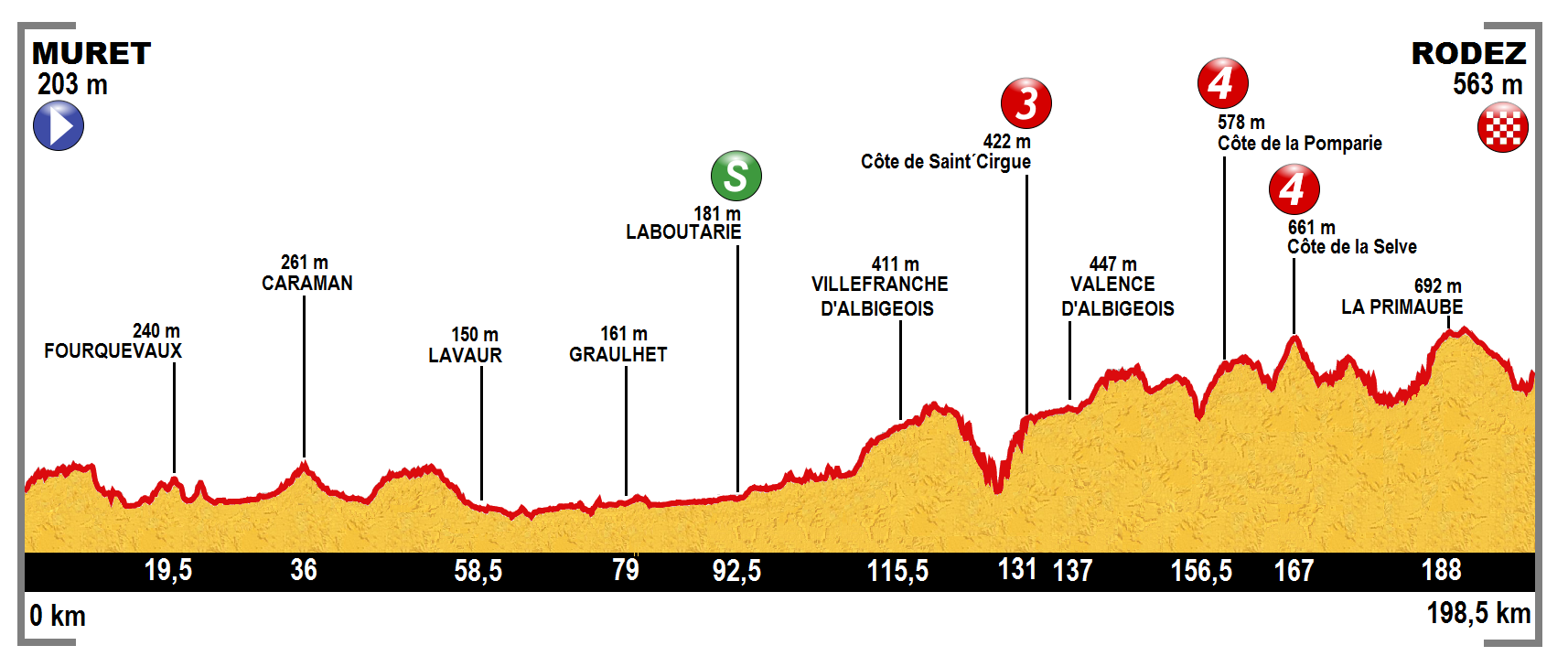
Stage 13 profile

This hilly intermediate stage began in Muret heading east through the southern outskirts of Toulouse, with racing officially starting after passing through Venerque. Continuing through Fourquevaux and Caraman, the riders turned north to go through Lavaur and then east to travel through Graulhet, to an intermediate sprint at Laboutarie. After turning north-east and travelling through Villefranche-d'Albigeois, the hills began. First was the category 3 climb of the Côte de Saint-Cirgue to 422 metres (1,385 ft). The riders then went through Valence-d'Albigeois and eventually turned north. Only 10.5 kilometres (6.5 mi) apart, the next two climbs came in relatively quick succession, with the category 4 Côte de Pomparie to 578 metres (1,896 ft) followed quickly by the category 4 Côte de la Selve at 661 metres (2,169 ft). From here, the route into Rodez was not flat, although the climb to La Primaube was not categorised. The 10.5 kilometres (6.5 mi) descent into Rodez allowed for a fast finish.

Stage 13 result

Rank	Rider	Team	Time
1	Greg Van Avermaet (BEL)	BMC Racing Team	4h 43' 42"
2	Peter Sagan (SVK)	Tinkoff–Saxo	+ 0"
3	Jan Bakelants (BEL)	AG2R La Mondiale	+ 3"
4	John Degenkolb (GER)	Team Giant–Alpecin	+ 7"
5	Paul Martens (GER)	LottoNL–Jumbo	+ 7"
6	Chris Froome (GBR)	Team Sky	+ 7"
7	Vincenzo Nibali (ITA)	Astana	+ 7"
8	Alberto Contador (ESP)	Tinkoff–Saxo	+ 7"
9	Alejandro Valverde (ESP)	Movistar Team	+ 7"
10	Tejay van Garderen (USA)	BMC Racing Team	+ 7"

General classification after stage 13

Rank	Rider	Team	Time
1	Chris Froome (GBR)	Team Sky	51h 34' 21"
2	Tejay van Garderen (USA)	BMC Racing Team	+ 2' 52"
3	Nairo Quintana (COL)	Movistar Team	+ 3' 09"
4	Alejandro Valverde (ESP)	Movistar Team	+ 3' 58"
5	Geraint Thomas (GBR)	Team Sky	+ 4' 03"
6	Alberto Contador (ESP)	Tinkoff–Saxo	+ 4' 04"
7	Robert Gesink (NED)	LottoNL–Jumbo	+ 5' 32"
8	Tony Gallopin (FRA)	Lotto–Soudal	+ 7' 32"
9	Vincenzo Nibali (ITA)	Astana	+ 7' 47"
10	Bauke Mollema (NED)	Trek Factory Racing	+ 8' 02"

== Stage 14 ==
18 July 2015 — Rodez to Mende, 178.5 km (111 mi)

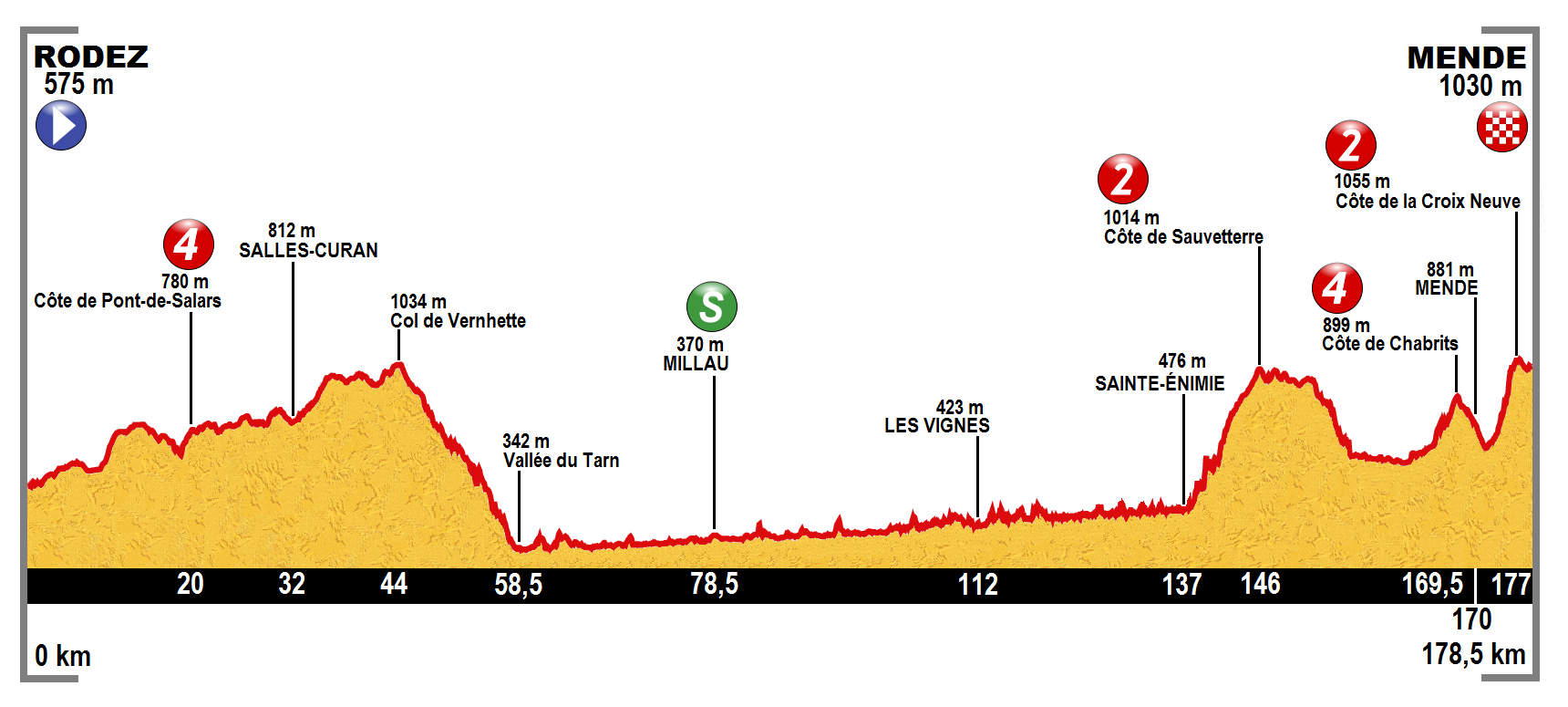
Stage 14 profile

This intermediate mountain stage departed from Rodez heading south to Flavin. The race then turned east to Pont-de-Salars, before quickly reaching the 1.3 kilometres (0.81 mi) category 4 climb of the Côte de Pont-de-Salars, at a gradient of 5.8%. The race continued south-east through Salles-Curan, descending from the plateau at the Col de la Vernhette, before eventually heading east. There was an intermediate sprint on the way into Millau, where the riders then turned north-east. The race then continued through the Gorges du Tarn passing Rivière-sur-Tarn, Les Vignes and La Malène. On reaching Sainte-Enimie, the 9 kilometres (5.6 mi) climb of the category 2 Côte de Sauveterre, at 1,014 metres (3,327 ft) and with an average gradient of 6%, began. The riders then continued along a plateau, before a descent to Balsièges and a turn west. At Barjac, the riders began the 1.9 kilometres (1.2 mi) climb of the category 4 Côte de Chabrits at 899 metres (2,949 ft), turning east along the way. The race travelled through Mende itself; the finish line was further on, at the opposite side of the city. The riders then faced the 3 kilometres (1.9 mi) climb of the category 2 Côte de la Croix Neuve to 1,055 metres (3,461 ft) with an average gradient of 10.1%. The finish line was another 1.5 kilometres (0.93 mi) on the plateau, adjacent to the Mende-Brenoux Aerodrome.

Stage 14 result

Rank	Rider	Team	Time
1	Steve Cummings (GBR)	MTN–Qhubeka	4h 23' 43"
2	Thibaut Pinot (FRA)	FDJ	+ 2"
3	Romain Bardet (FRA)	AG2R La Mondiale	+ 3"
4	Rigoberto Urán (COL)	Etixx–Quick-Step	+ 20"
5	Peter Sagan (SVK)	Tinkoff–Saxo	+ 29"
6	Cyril Gautier (FRA)	Team Europcar	+ 32"
7	Rubén Plaza (ESP)	Lampre–Merida	+ 32"
8	Bob Jungels (LUX)	Trek Factory Racing	+ 32"
9	Jonathan Castroviejo (ESP)	Movistar Team	+ 32"
10	Simon Yates (GBR)	Orica–GreenEDGE	+ 33"

General classification after stage 14

Rank	Rider	Team	Time
1	Chris Froome (GBR)	Team Sky	56h 02' 19"
2	Nairo Quintana (COL)	Movistar Team	+ 3' 10"
3	Tejay van Garderen (USA)	BMC Racing Team	+ 3' 32"
4	Alejandro Valverde (ESP)	Movistar Team	+ 4' 02"
5	Alberto Contador (ESP)	Tinkoff–Saxo	+ 4' 23"
6	Geraint Thomas (GBR)	Team Sky	+ 4' 54"
7	Robert Gesink (NED)	LottoNL–Jumbo	+ 6' 23"
8	Vincenzo Nibali (ITA)	Astana	+ 8' 17"
9	Tony Gallopin (FRA)	Lotto–Soudal	+ 8' 23"
10	Bauke Mollema (NED)	Trek Factory Racing	+ 8' 53"

== Stage 15 ==
19 July 2015 — Mende to Valence, 183 km (114 mi)

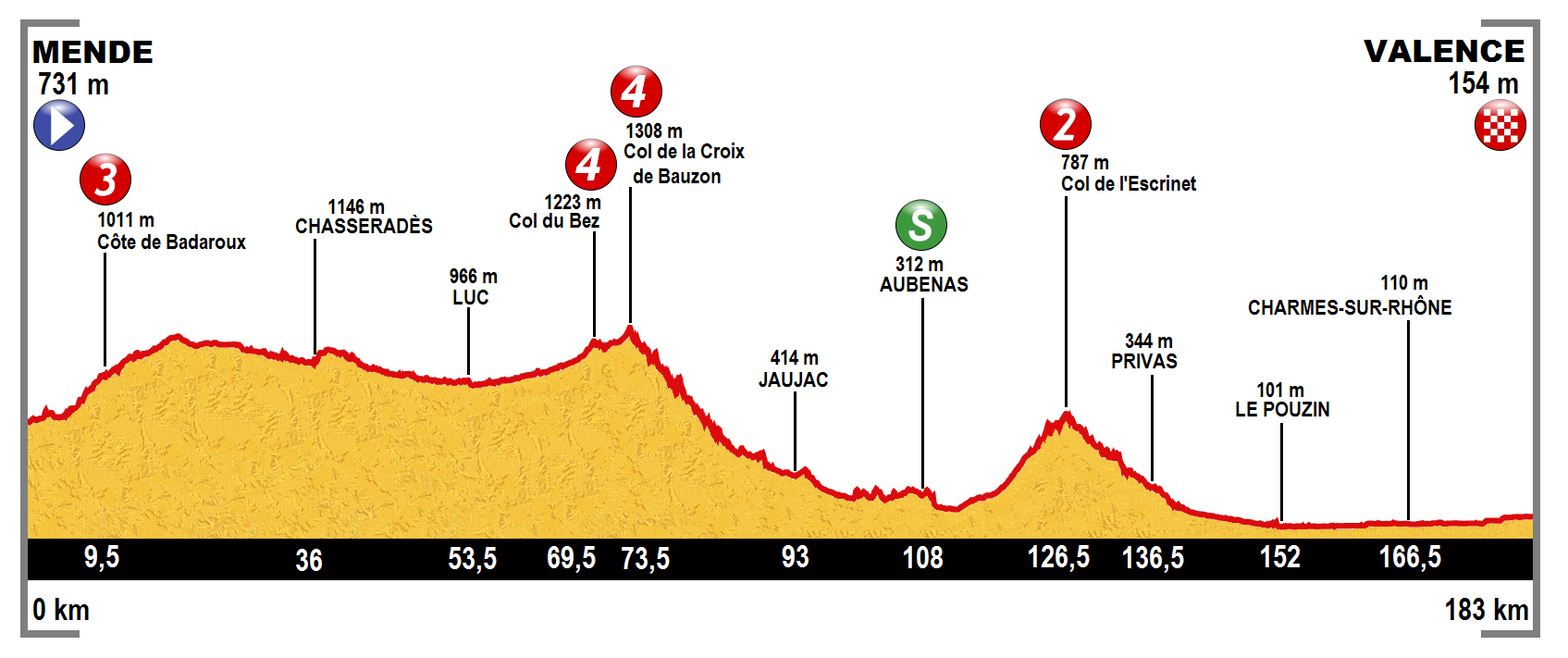
Stage 15 profile

This hilly stage departed from Mende heading east, and immediately began the category 3 climb of the Côte de Badaroux to 1,011 metres (3,317 ft). The race wound in a generally eastern direction through Chasseradès and Luc and continued east over the category 4 Col du Bez and the category 4 Col de la Croix de Bauzon reaching an altitude of 1,308 metres (4,291 ft). The race then descended through Jaujac to an intermediate sprint at Aubenas, before turning north-east. This was followed by the climb of the category 2 Col de l'Escrinet to 787 metres (2,582 ft), before a descent east through Privas to Le Pouzin, where the riders began to follow the western bank of the Rhône. The race turned north-east again, heading through La Voulte-sur-Rhône and Charmes-sur-Rhône to Guilherand-Granges. Crossing the Rhône, the race then headed through the centre of Valence to the finish line.

Stage 15 result

Rank	Rider	Team	Time
1	André Greipel (GER)	Lotto–Soudal	3h 56' 35"
2	John Degenkolb (GER)	Team Giant–Alpecin	+ 0"
3	Alexander Kristoff (NOR)	Team Katusha	+ 0"
4	Peter Sagan (SVK)	Tinkoff–Saxo	+ 0"
5	Edvald Boasson Hagen (NOR)	MTN–Qhubeka	+ 0"
6	Ramūnas Navardauskas (LTU)	Cannondale–Garmin	+ 0"
7	Christophe Laporte (FRA)	Cofidis	+ 0"
8	Michael Matthews (AUS)	Orica–GreenEDGE	+ 0"
9	Davide Cimolai (ITA)	Lampre–Merida	+ 0"
10	Florian Vachon (FRA)	Bretagne–Séché Environnement	+ 0"

General classification after stage 15

Rank	Rider	Team	Time
1	Chris Froome (GBR)	Team Sky	59h 58' 54"
2	Nairo Quintana (COL)	Movistar Team	+ 3' 10"
3	Tejay van Garderen (USA)	BMC Racing Team	+ 3' 32"
4	Alejandro Valverde (ESP)	Movistar Team	+ 4' 02"
5	Alberto Contador (ESP)	Tinkoff–Saxo	+ 4' 23"
6	Geraint Thomas (GBR)	Team Sky	+ 4' 54"
7	Robert Gesink (NED)	LottoNL–Jumbo	+ 6' 23"
8	Vincenzo Nibali (ITA)	Astana	+ 8' 17"
9	Tony Gallopin (FRA)	Lotto–Soudal	+ 8' 23"
10	Bauke Mollema (NED)	Trek Factory Racing	+ 8' 53"

== Stage 16 ==
20 July 2015 — Bourg-de-Péage to Gap, 201 km (125 mi)

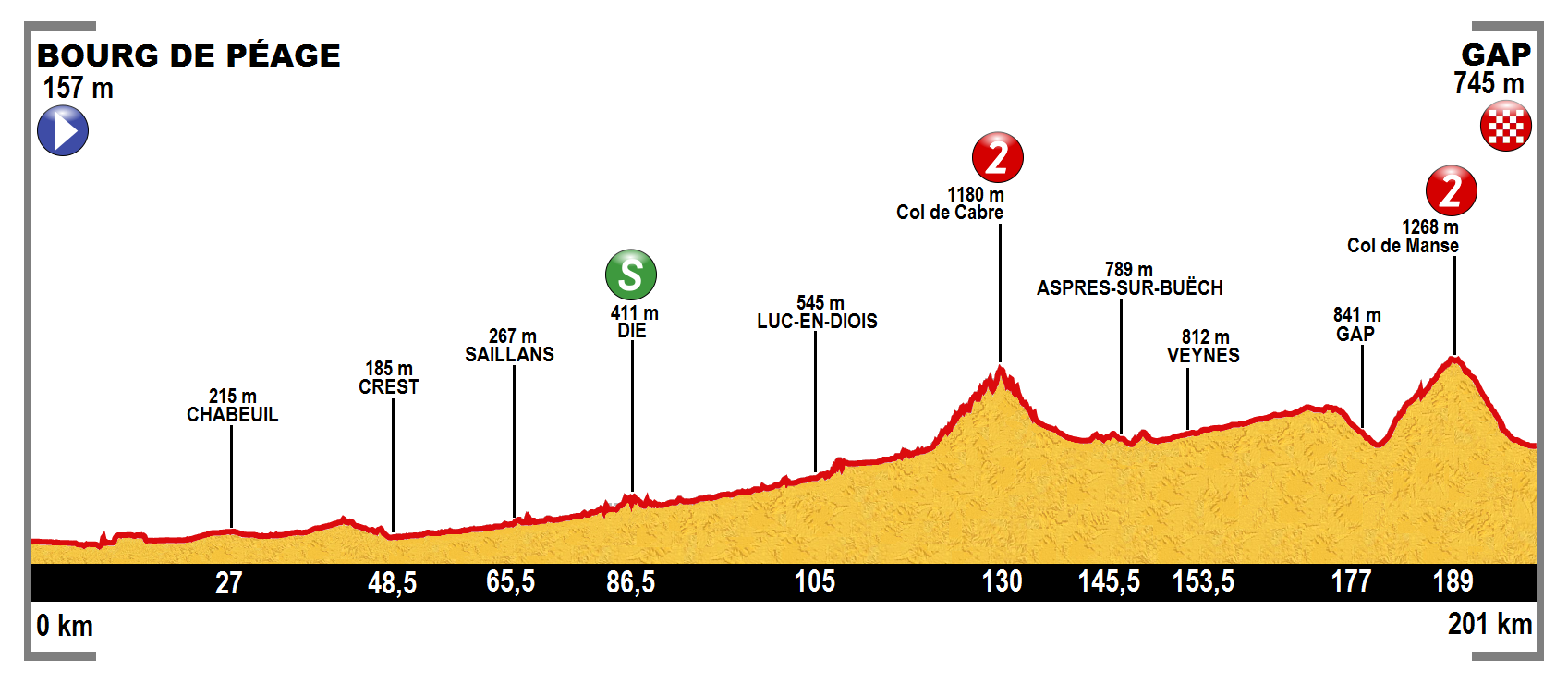
Stage 16 profile

This medium mountain stage departed from Bourg-de-Péage heading west, with racing officially starting just before reaching Granges-les-Beaumont, with racing being generally uphill for most of the day. Taking a route south through Montélier and Chabeuil to Crest, the riders turned east to Espenel and then headed north to Sainte-Croix. Heading east, an intermediate sprint took place at Die and the riders turned south-east to travel through Luc-en-Diois. The category 2 climb of the Col de Cabre, to an altitude of 1,180 metres (3,870 ft), followed with a descent to Aspres-sur-Buëch. Continuing east, the race went through Veynes and La Freissinouse before descending into Gap for the first time. Heading north and east, back out of the city, the riders climbed the category 2 Col de Manse, to an altitude of 1,268 metres (4,160 ft). The race then descended south and then west back into Gap, to the finish line.

Stage 16 result

Rank	Rider	Team	Time
1	Rubén Plaza (ESP)	Lampre–Merida	4h 30' 10"
2	Peter Sagan (SVK)	Tinkoff–Saxo	+ 30"
3	Jarlinson Pantano (COL)	IAM Cycling	+ 36"
4	Simon Geschke (GER)	Team Giant–Alpecin	+ 40"
5	Bob Jungels (LUX)	Trek Factory Racing	+ 40"
6	Christophe Riblon (FRA)	AG2R La Mondiale	+ 40"
7	Daniel Teklehaimanot (ERI)	MTN–Qhubeka	+ 53"
8	Thomas De Gendt (BEL)	Lotto–Soudal	+ 1' 00"
9	Luis Ángel Maté (ESP)	Cofidis	+ 1' 22"
10	Thomas Voeckler (FRA)	Team Europcar	+ 1' 22"

General classification after stage 16

Rank	Rider	Team	Time
1	Chris Froome (GBR)	Team Sky	64h 47' 16"
2	Nairo Quintana (COL)	Movistar Team	+ 3' 10"
3	Tejay van Garderen (USA)	BMC Racing Team	+ 3' 32"
4	Alejandro Valverde (ESP)	Movistar Team	+ 4' 02"
5	Alberto Contador (ESP)	Tinkoff–Saxo	+ 4' 23"
6	Geraint Thomas (GBR)	Team Sky	+ 5' 32"
7	Robert Gesink (NED)	LottoNL–Jumbo	+ 6' 23"
8	Vincenzo Nibali (ITA)	Astana	+ 7' 49"
9	Bauke Mollema (NED)	Trek Factory Racing	+ 8' 53"
10	Warren Barguil (FRA)	Team Giant–Alpecin	+ 11' 03"

== Rest Day 2 ==
21 July 2015 — Gap

== Stage 17 ==
22 July 2015 — Digne-les-Bains to Pra-Loup, 161 km (100 mi)

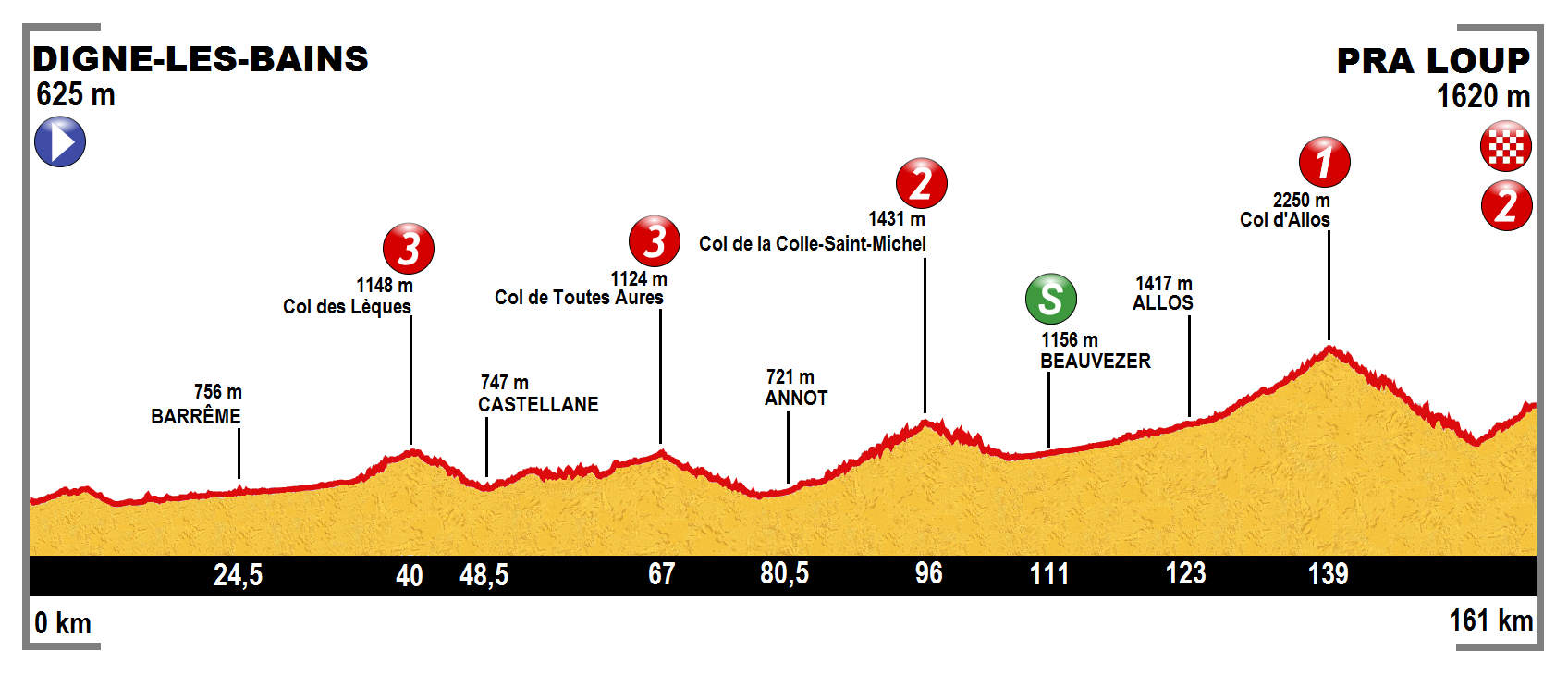
Stage 17 profile

This mountain stage began in Digne-les-Bains heading south, with racing officially starting just outside the town centre at Les Dieyes. The peloton turned south-east from Châteauredon to head along the Route Napoléon. Travelling through Barrême, the riders arrived at the 6 kilometres (3.7 mi) category 3 climb of the Col des Lèques, to 1,143 metres (3,750 ft) with a gradient of 5.3%. The race then descended to Castellane, and passed through Saint-Julien-du-Verdon before beginning the 6.1 kilometres (3.8 mi) climb of the category 3 Col de Toutes Aures to 1,124 metres (3,688 ft) at a gradient of 3.1%. Descending to Annot, the race turned north-west along the way to the 11 kilometres (6.8 mi) category 2 climb of the Col de la Colle-Saint-Michel at 1,431 metres (4,695 ft) with an average gradient of 5.2%. The race then descended north to an intermediate sprint at Beauvezer. The riders continued through Colmars-les-Alpes and Allos before the biggest ascent of the day, the 14 kilometres (8.7 mi) category 1 climb of the Col d'Allos, to an altitude of 2,250 metres (7,380 ft) and with an average gradient of 5.5%. Descending along the hillside to Uvernet-Fours, the riders then turned west to begin the 6.2 kilometres (3.9 mi) category 2 climb to the stage finish at Pra-Loup, at 1,620 metres (5,310 ft) and with an average gradient of 6.5% on the way up. It is exactly the same stage as the fifth one of the Critérium du Dauphiné, where Romain Bardet won the honours thanks to a hair-raising descent before hitting the final climb.

Due to the change of the route on stage 20, announced on 25 June, the Souvenir Henri Desgrange was awarded at the Col d'Allos.

Stage 17 result

Rank	Rider	Team	Time
1	Simon Geschke (GER)	Team Giant–Alpecin	4h 12' 17"
2	Andrew Talansky (USA)	Cannondale–Garmin	+ 32"
3	Rigoberto Urán (COL)	Etixx–Quick-Step	+ 1' 01"
4	Thibaut Pinot (FRA)	FDJ	+ 1' 36"
5	Mathias Frank (SUI)	IAM Cycling	+ 1' 40"
6	Steven Kruijswijk (NED)	LottoNL–Jumbo	+ 2' 27"
7	Nicolas Roche (IRL)	Team Sky	+ 3' 02"
8	Jonathan Castroviejo (ESP)	Movistar Team	+ 3' 04"
9	Serge Pauwels (BEL)	MTN–Qhubeka	+ 3' 05"
10	Adam Yates (GBR)	Orica–GreenEDGE	+ 3' 21"

General classification after stage 17

Rank	Rider	Team	Time
1	Chris Froome (GBR)	Team Sky	69h 06' 49"
2	Nairo Quintana (COL)	Movistar Team	+ 3' 10"
3	Alejandro Valverde (ESP)	Movistar Team	+ 4' 09"
4	Geraint Thomas (GBR)	Team Sky	+ 6' 34"
5	Alberto Contador (ESP)	Tinkoff–Saxo	+ 6' 40"
6	Robert Gesink (NED)	LottoNL–Jumbo	+ 7' 39"
7	Vincenzo Nibali (ITA)	Astana	+ 8' 04"
8	Mathias Frank (SUI)	IAM Cycling	+ 8' 47"
9	Bauke Mollema (NED)	Trek Factory Racing	+ 11' 47"
10	Warren Barguil (FRA)	Team Giant–Alpecin	+ 13' 08"

== Stage 18 ==
23 July 2015 — Gap to Saint-Jean-de-Maurienne, 186.5 km (116 mi)

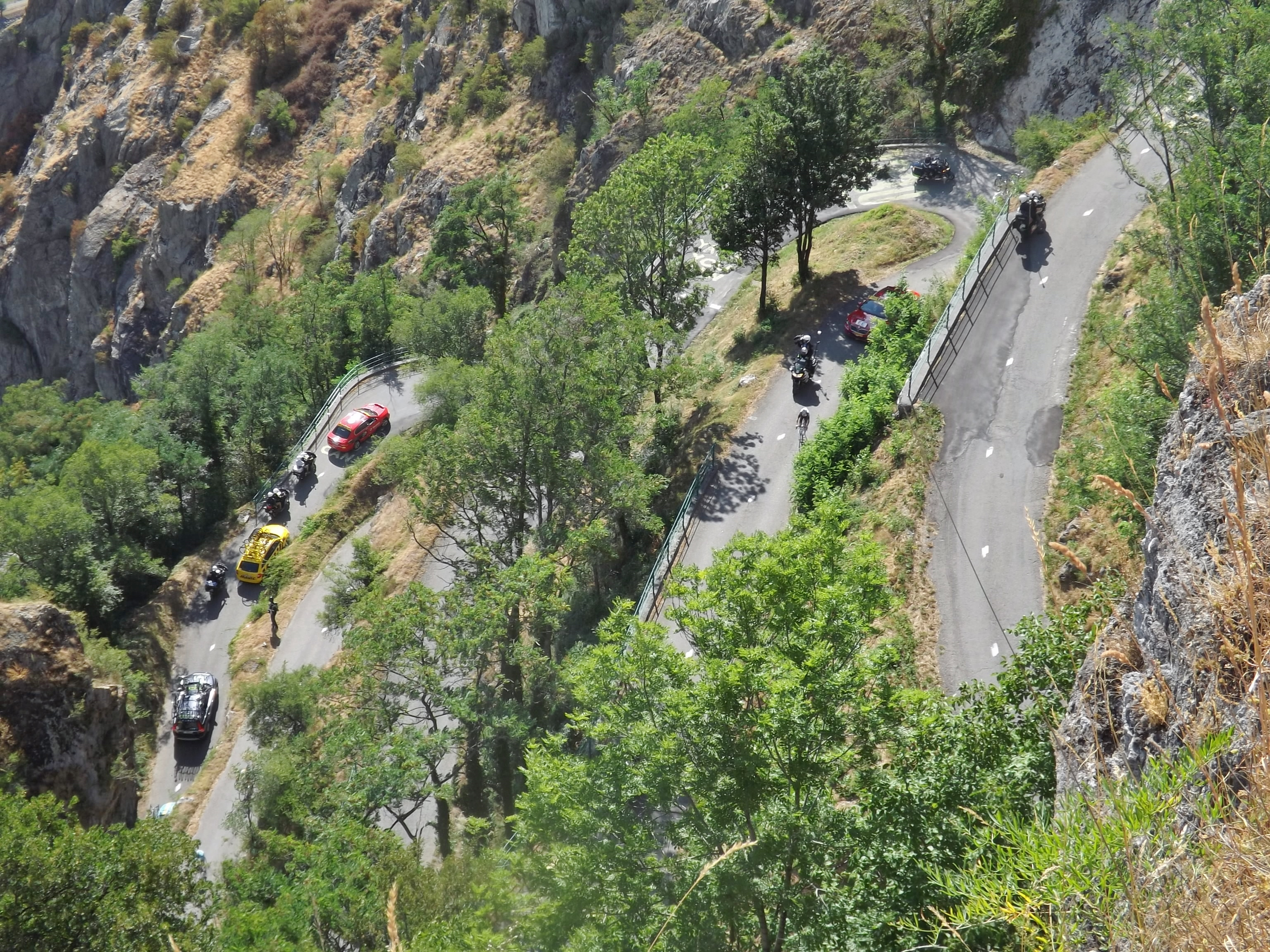
Bardet riding to the stage victory

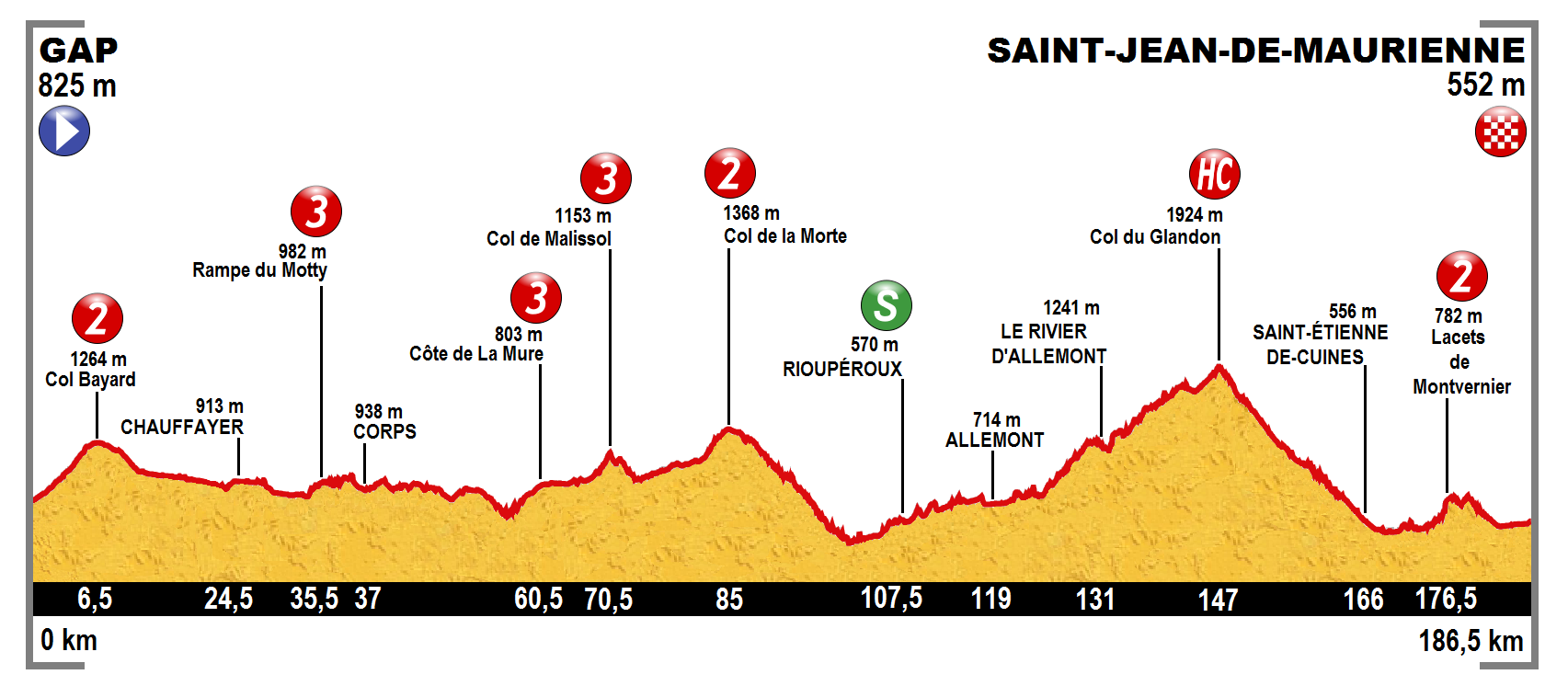
Stage 18 profile

This mountainous stage departed from Gap heading north with an immediate 6.3-kilometre (3.9-mile) climb over the 1,264-metre (4,147-foot) category 2 Col Bayard, at a gradient of 7%. The race then descended to Chauffayer along the Route Napoléon, before heading north-west to the 2.3-kilometre (1.4-mile) category 3 climb of the Rampe du Motty, a climb of 8.3% ascending to 982 metres (3,222 feet). After a gradual descent through Corps and La Salle-en-Beaumont, the riders then ascended the 2.7-kilometre (1.7-mile) and 7.5% climb of the category 3 Côte de La Mure, to 803 metres (2,635 feet). This climb to a plateau was followed, to the east, by the 2.8-kilometre (1.7-mile) category 3 Col de Malissol to 1,153 metres (3,783 feet) at an average gradient of 8.7%. Then, the riders headed north through Lavaldens to the 3.1-kilometre (1.9-mile) climb of the category 2 Col de la Morte, to 1,368 metres (4,488 feet) at an average gradient of 8.4%. The descent to the valley floor at Séchilienne was followed by an intermediate sprint in Rioupéroux, where the riders headed north-east through Allemont before beginning the biggest climb of the day. The 21.7-kilometre (13.5-mile) climb of the Hors catégorie Col du Glandon to 1,924 metres (6,312 feet), with an average gradient of 5.1%, was followed by a 19-kilometre (12-mile) descent, with few hairpin turns, to Saint-Étienne-de-Cuines. Here, the race made an abrupt turn south-east and began the final climb of the day: This was a 3.4-kilometre (2.1-mile) climb of the 782-metre (2,566-foot) category 2 Lacets de Montvernier, at an average gradient of 8.2%. The riders then descended to Hermillon, before a 5.5-kilometre (3.4-mile) ride to the stage finish at Saint-Jean-de-Maurienne.

Stage 18 result

Rank	Rider	Team	Time
1	Romain Bardet (FRA)	AG2R La Mondiale	5h 03' 40"
2	Pierre Rolland (FRA)	Team Europcar	+ 33"
3	Winner Anacona (COL)	Movistar Team	+ 59"
4	Bob Jungels (LUX)	Trek Factory Racing	+ 59"
5	Jakob Fuglsang (DEN)	Astana	+ 59"
6	Serge Pauwels (BEL)	MTN–Qhubeka	+ 1' 01"
7	Cyril Gautier (FRA)	Team Europcar	+ 1' 50"
8	Damiano Caruso (ITA)	BMC Racing Team	+ 1' 50"
9	Andrew Talansky (USA)	Cannondale–Garmin	+ 1' 55"
10	Warren Barguil (FRA)	Team Giant–Alpecin	+ 3' 02"

General classification after stage 18

Rank	Rider	Team	Time
1	Chris Froome (GBR)	Team Sky	74h 13' 31"
2	Nairo Quintana (COL)	Movistar Team	+ 3' 10"
3	Alejandro Valverde (ESP)	Movistar Team	+ 4' 09"
4	Geraint Thomas (GBR)	Team Sky	+ 6' 34"
5	Alberto Contador (ESP)	Tinkoff–Saxo	+ 6' 40"
6	Robert Gesink (NED)	LottoNL–Jumbo	+ 7' 39"
7	Vincenzo Nibali (ITA)	Astana	+ 8' 04"
8	Mathias Frank (SUI)	IAM Cycling	+ 8' 47"
9	Bauke Mollema (NED)	Trek Factory Racing	+ 12' 06"
10	Romain Bardet (FRA)	AG2R La Mondiale	+ 12' 52"

== Stage 19 ==
24 July 2015 — Saint-Jean-de-Maurienne to La Toussuire – Les Sybelles, 138 km (86 mi)

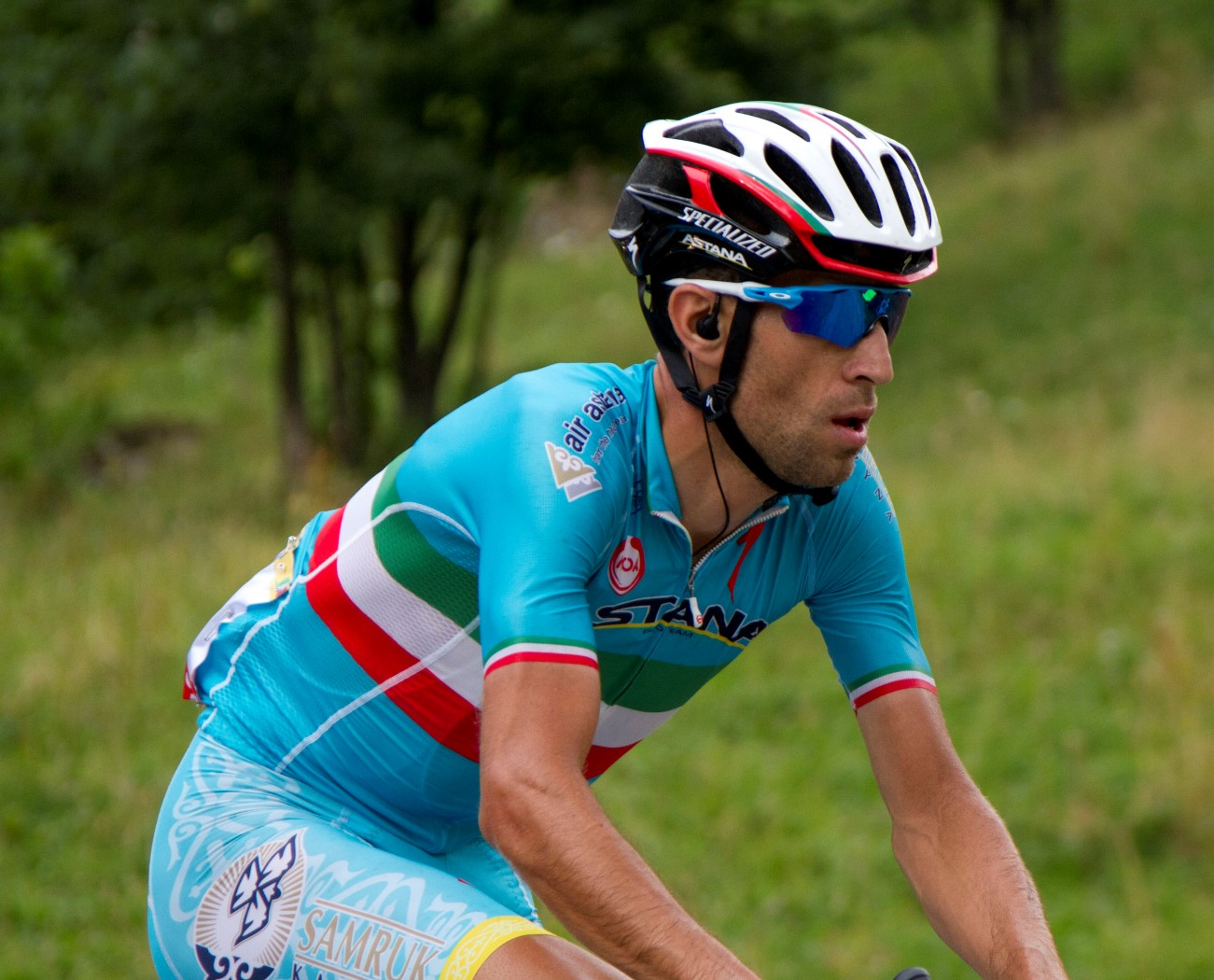
Stage winner Nibali

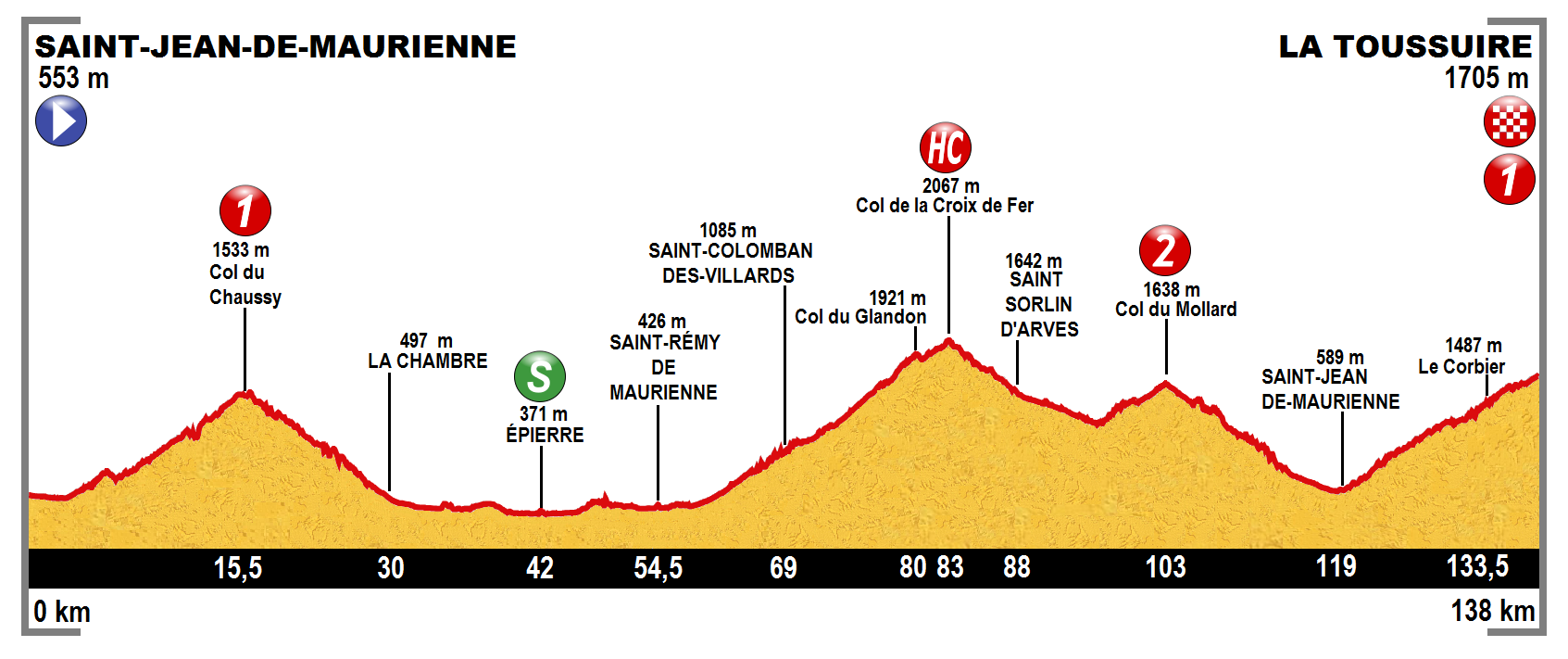
Stage 19 profile

This mountainous stage began in Saint-Jean-de-Maurienne, with racing officially starting to the north at Hermillon. The peloton immediately began the 15.4 kilometres (9.6 mi) climb of the category 1 Col du Chaussy at 1,533 metres (5,030 ft), with an average gradient of 6.3%. The riders then descended to La Chambre to the west, and followed the Arc river to an intermediate sprint at Épierre to the north. After crossing the Pont d'Épierre, the riders turned south along the other side of the Arc river and continued through the valley to Saint-Étienne-de-Cuines. From here the riders turned south-west to begin the 22.4 kilometres (13.9 mi) climb of the Hors catégorie Col de la Croix de Fer at 2,067 metres (6,781 ft), with an average gradient of 6.9%, passing the uncategorised Col du Glandon and turning south-east on the way. With a partial descent to Belleville in the commune of Saint-Jean-d'Arves, the riders then began to re-climb, this time north-east on the 5.7 kilometres (3.5 mi) climb of the category 2 Col du Mollard at 1,638 metres (5,374 ft), with an average gradient of 6.8%. The race then descended north, nearly returning to where it started the day at Saint-Jean-de-Maurienne, before beginning the final 18 kilometres (11 mi) category 1 climb west to La Toussuire. This final climb of the day has a gradient of 6.1%, and ascends to an altitude of 1,705 metres (5,594 ft).

Stage 19 result

Rank	Rider	Team	Time
1	Vincenzo Nibali (ITA)	Astana	4h 22' 53"
2	Nairo Quintana (COL)	Movistar Team	+ 44"
3	Chris Froome (GBR)	Team Sky	+ 1' 14"
4	Thibaut Pinot (FRA)	FDJ	+ 2' 26"
5	Romain Bardet (FRA)	AG2R La Mondiale	+ 2' 26"
6	Alejandro Valverde (ESP)	Movistar Team	+ 2' 26"
7	Bauke Mollema (NED)	Trek Factory Racing	+ 2' 26"
8	Robert Gesink (NED)	LottoNL–Jumbo	+ 2' 26"
9	Alberto Contador (ESP)	Tinkoff–Saxo	+ 2' 26"
10	Samuel Sánchez (ESP)	BMC Racing Team	+ 2' 26"

General classification after stage 19

Rank	Rider	Team	Time
1	Chris Froome (GBR)	Team Sky	78h 37' 34"
2	Nairo Quintana (COL)	Movistar Team	+ 2' 38"
3	Alejandro Valverde (ESP)	Movistar Team	+ 5' 25"
4	Vincenzo Nibali (ITA)	Astana	+ 6' 44"
5	Alberto Contador (ESP)	Tinkoff–Saxo	+ 7' 56"
6	Robert Gesink (NED)	LottoNL–Jumbo	+ 8' 55"
7	Mathias Frank (SUI)	IAM Cycling	+ 12' 39"
8	Bauke Mollema (NED)	Trek Factory Racing	+ 13' 22"
9	Romain Bardet (FRA)	AG2R La Mondiale	+ 14' 08"
10	Pierre Rolland (FRA)	Team Europcar	+ 17' 27"

== Stage 20 ==
25 July 2015 — Modane to Alpe d'Huez, 110.5 km (69 mi)

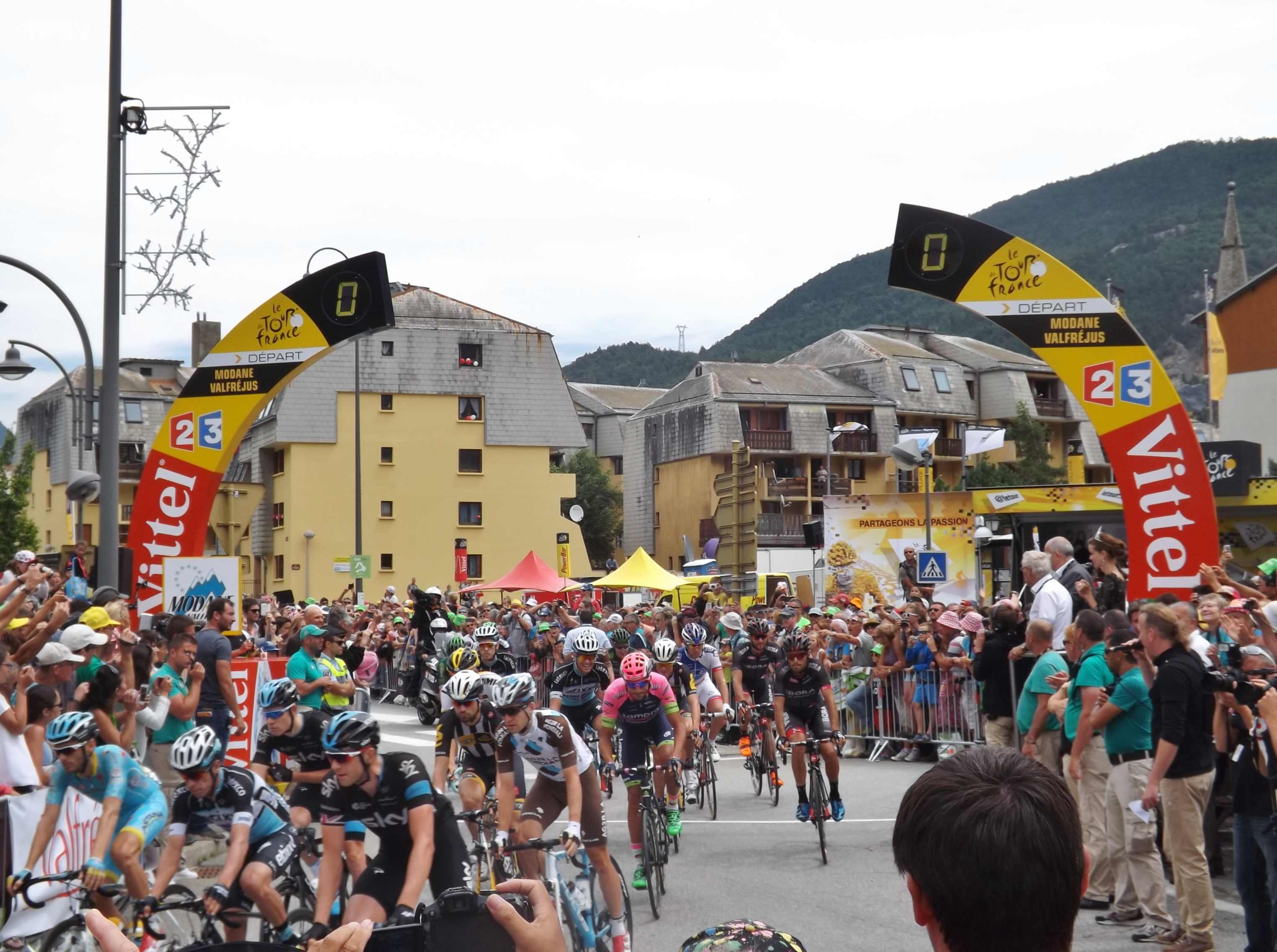
Start in Modane

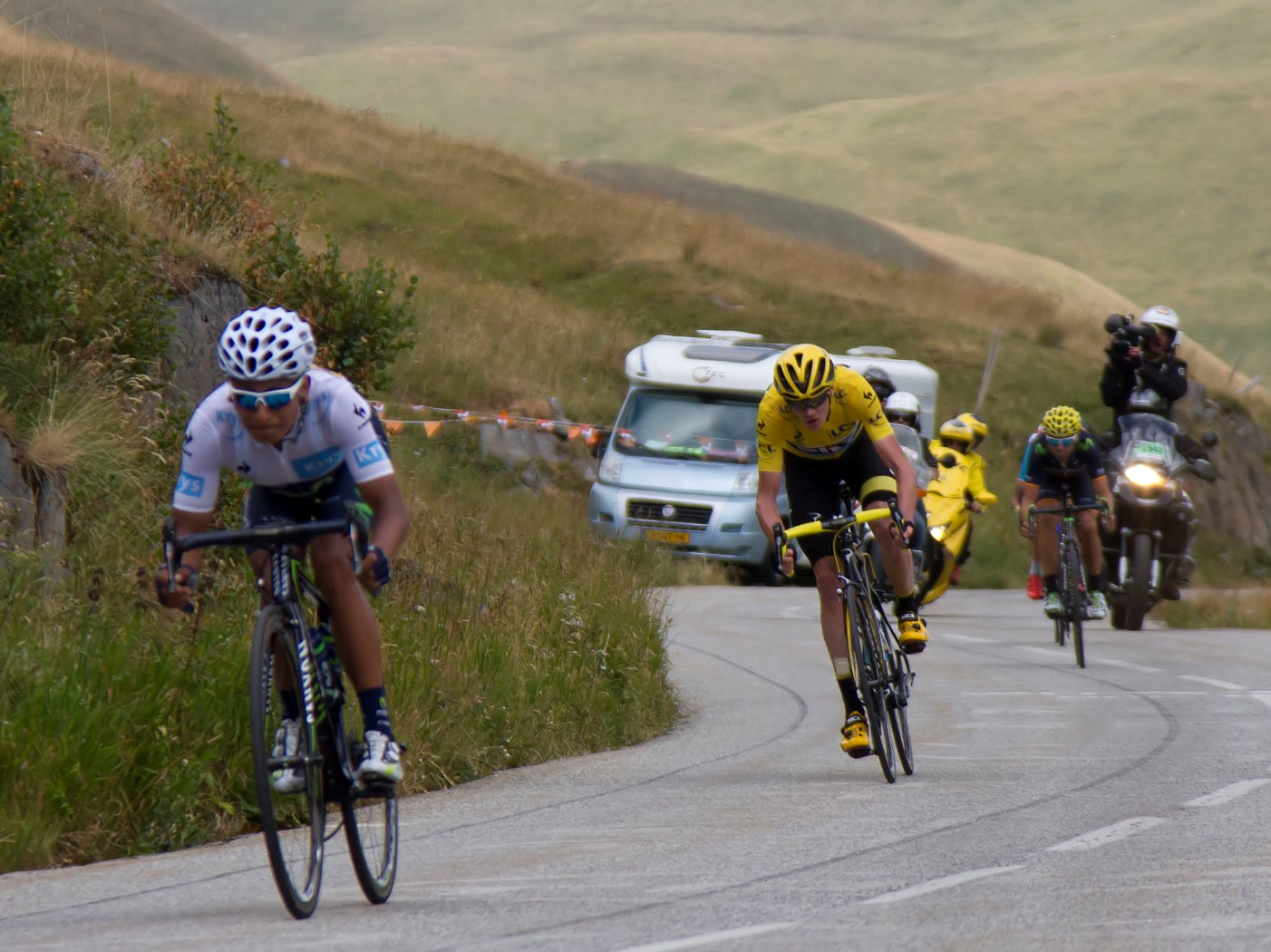
Quintana and Froome descending

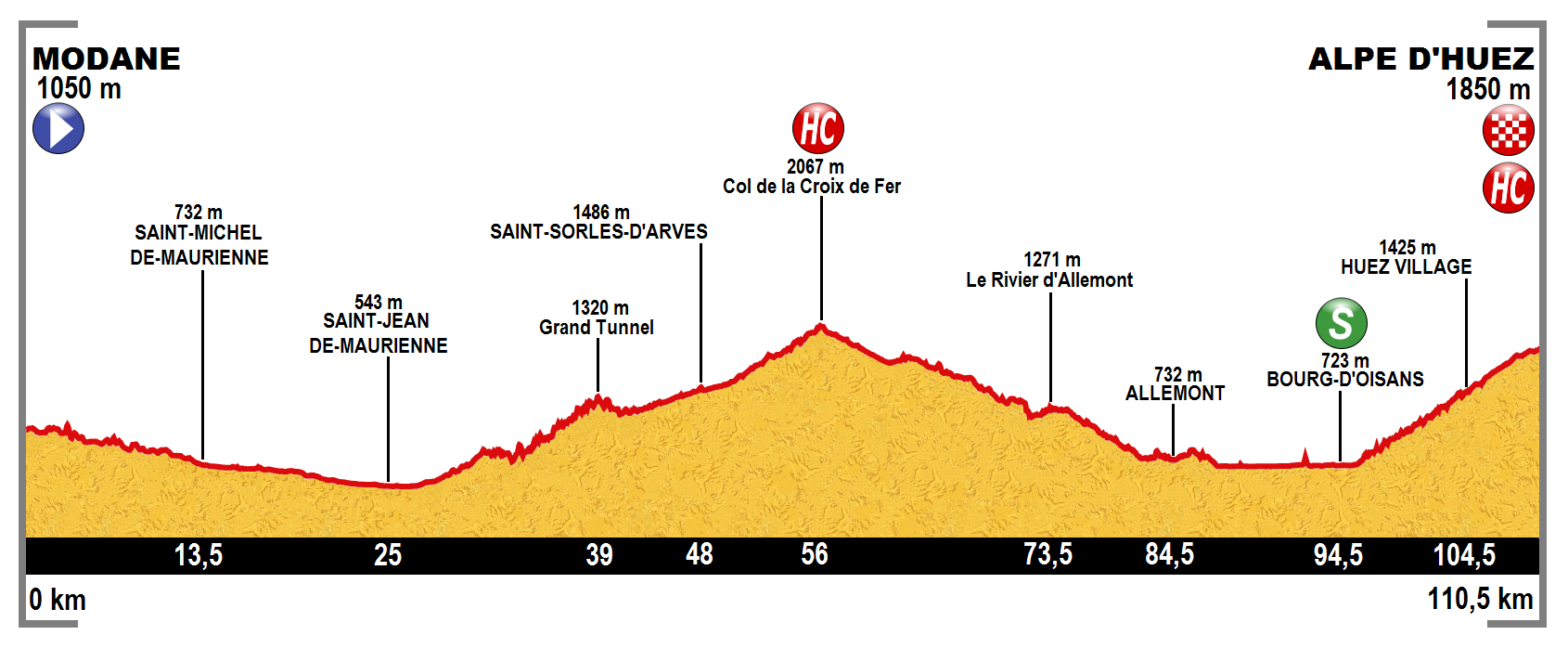
Stage 20 profile

This mountainous stage began in Modane, with racing officially starting to the west at Fourneaux. In the original plans the peloton had been due to travel by the category 1 Col du Télégraphe (1,566 metres (5,138 ft)) and the Hors catégorie Col du Galibier at 2,645 metres (8,678 ft) (where the first rider over the summit would have been awarded the Souvenir Henri Desgrange) before the 13.8 kilometres (8.6 mi) climb of the Hors catégorie Alpe d'Huez at 1,850 metres (6,070 ft). A route used frequently in the Tour, it has an average gradient of 8.1%.

However, on 25 June, it was announced that due to the expected landslide resulting in the closure of the Chambon tunnel on the Briançon–Grenoble road, the route of stage 20 would be changed, bypassing the Col du Galibier. Instead of using the Télégraphe, the riders would continue along the valley to Saint-Jean-de-Maurienne rather than Saint-Michel-de-Maurienne, where they would start the 29 kilometres (18 mi) long Hors catégorie Col de la Croix de Fer. The climb was used for the second day in a row, although a different side was used. This one is less steep, averaging 5.2%. From there, the peloton used the route of stage 18's ascent as a descent towards Le Bourg-d'Oisans, where the planned intermediate sprint was held, before the Alpe d'Huez, also as scheduled. The distance of the stage remained intact.

Stage 20 result

Rank	Rider	Team	Time
1	Thibaut Pinot (FRA)	FDJ	3h 17' 21"
2	Nairo Quintana (COL)	Movistar Team	+ 18"
3	Ryder Hesjedal (CAN)	Cannondale–Garmin	+ 41"
4	Alejandro Valverde (ESP)	Movistar Team	+ 1' 38"
5	Chris Froome (GBR)	Team Sky	+ 1' 38"
6	Pierre Rolland (FRA)	Team Europcar	+ 1' 41"
7	Richie Porte (AUS)	Team Sky	+ 2' 11"
8	Winner Anacona (COL)	Movistar Team	+ 2' 32"
9	Wout Poels (NED)	Team Sky	+ 2' 50"
10	Rubén Plaza (ESP)	Lampre–Merida	+ 2' 50"

General classification after stage 20

Rank	Rider	Team	Time
1	Chris Froome (GBR)	Team Sky	81h 56' 33"
2	Nairo Quintana (COL)	Movistar Team	+ 1' 12"
3	Alejandro Valverde (ESP)	Movistar Team	+ 5' 25"
4	Vincenzo Nibali (ITA)	Astana	+ 8' 36"
5	Alberto Contador (ESP)	Tinkoff–Saxo	+ 9' 48"
6	Robert Gesink (NED)	LottoNL–Jumbo	+ 10' 47"
7	Bauke Mollema (NED)	Trek Factory Racing	+ 15' 14"
8	Mathias Frank (SUI)	IAM Cycling	+ 15' 39"
9	Romain Bardet (FRA)	AG2R La Mondiale	+ 16' 00"
10	Pierre Rolland (FRA)	Team Europcar	+ 17' 30"

== Stage 21 ==
26 July 2015 — Sèvres to Paris, 109.5 km (68 mi)

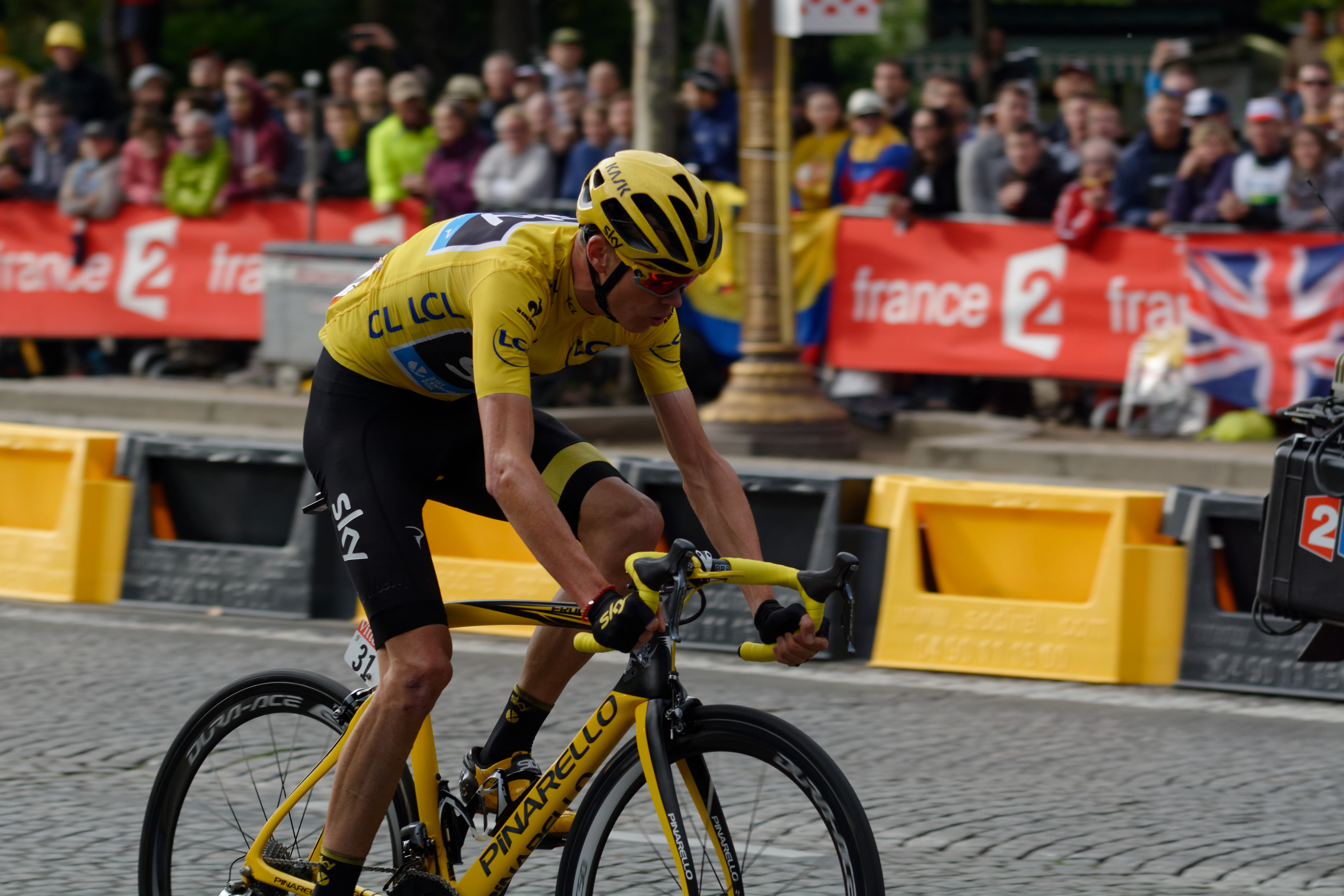
Froome, riding through Paris, during the final stage

The final stage departed from Sèvres heading west, with racing officially starting on the D985 at Ville-d'Avray, before doubling back to take the D407, back through Sèvres. The riders then headed south-east, going over the category 4 Côte de l'Observatoire, through Meudon and east to Issy-les-Moulineaux. The race then took a circuitous turn west to cross the Seine at the Pont d'Issy, over the northern point of Île Saint-Germain. The race crossed into Boulogne-Billancourt and followed the Rive Droite to the Longchamp Racecourse, where the riders passed around the northern side, before crossing the Bois de Boulogne to the Palais des congrès de Paris. The race headed up the Avenue de la Grande Armée, to reach the Arc de Triomphe, and then headed down Avenue Marceau, back towards the Seine. The peloton turned right onto the Avenue de New York, then turned left and crossed the Seine at the Pont d'Iéna. After crossing the bridge, the riders turned left again, in the shadow of the Eiffel Tower, along Quai Branly and turned onto Avenue Bosquet. This was followed by the Avenue de Tourville and the Boulevard des Invalides. The race then crossed through the gardens of Les Invalides reaching the Quai d'Orsay and turning right. On reaching the Pont du Carrousel, the race crossed the Seine for the final time.

The race passed the Louvre and turned left to travel along the Rue de Rivoli, through the Place de la Concorde and onto the Champs-Élysées. The race then began ten circuits around central Paris, heading up the Champs-Élysées and, as has been the case since 2013, around the Arc de Triomphe on the Place de l'Étoile. The riders returned down the opposite side of the Champs-Élysées, and around the Jardin des Tuileries. Finally, back along the Rue de Rivoli, and through the Place de la Concorde, to the finish line on the Champs-Élysées.

Because of poor weather conditions in Paris before the start of the stage (and during the La Course women's race), the race organizers decided that all general classification times would stop upon the first crossing of the line on the Champs-Élysées, which meant that Chris Froome's victory was secured. The riders would still have to complete all 10 laps of the circuit to complete the full race distance.

Stage 21 result

Rank	Rider	Team	Time
1	André Greipel (GER)	Lotto–Soudal	2h 49' 41"
2	Bryan Coquard (FRA)	Team Europcar	+ 0"
3	Alexander Kristoff (NOR)	Team Katusha	+ 0"
4	Edvald Boasson Hagen (NOR)	MTN–Qhubeka	+ 0"
5	Arnaud Démare (FRA)	FDJ	+ 0"
6	Mark Cavendish (GBR)	Etixx–Quick-Step	+ 0"
7	Peter Sagan (SVK)	Tinkoff–Saxo	+ 0"
8	John Degenkolb (GER)	Team Giant–Alpecin	+ 0"
9	Michael Matthews (AUS)	Orica–GreenEDGE	+ 0"
10	Ramūnas Navardauskas (LIT)	Cannondale–Garmin	+ 0"

Final general classification

Rank	Rider	Team	Time
1	Chris Froome (GBR)	Team Sky	84h 46' 14"
2	Nairo Quintana (COL)	Movistar Team	+ 1' 12"
3	Alejandro Valverde (ESP)	Movistar Team	+ 5' 25"
4	Vincenzo Nibali (ITA)	Astana	+ 8' 36"
5	Alberto Contador (ESP)	Tinkoff–Saxo	+ 9' 48"
6	Robert Gesink (NED)	LottoNL–Jumbo	+ 10' 47"
7	Bauke Mollema (NED)	Trek Factory Racing	+ 15' 14"
8	Mathias Frank (SUI)	IAM Cycling	+ 15' 39"
9	Romain Bardet (FRA)	AG2R La Mondiale	+ 16' 00"
10	Pierre Rolland (FRA)	Team Europcar	+ 17' 30"
