= Saint-Eusèbe-en-Champsaur =

- Part of Aubessagne
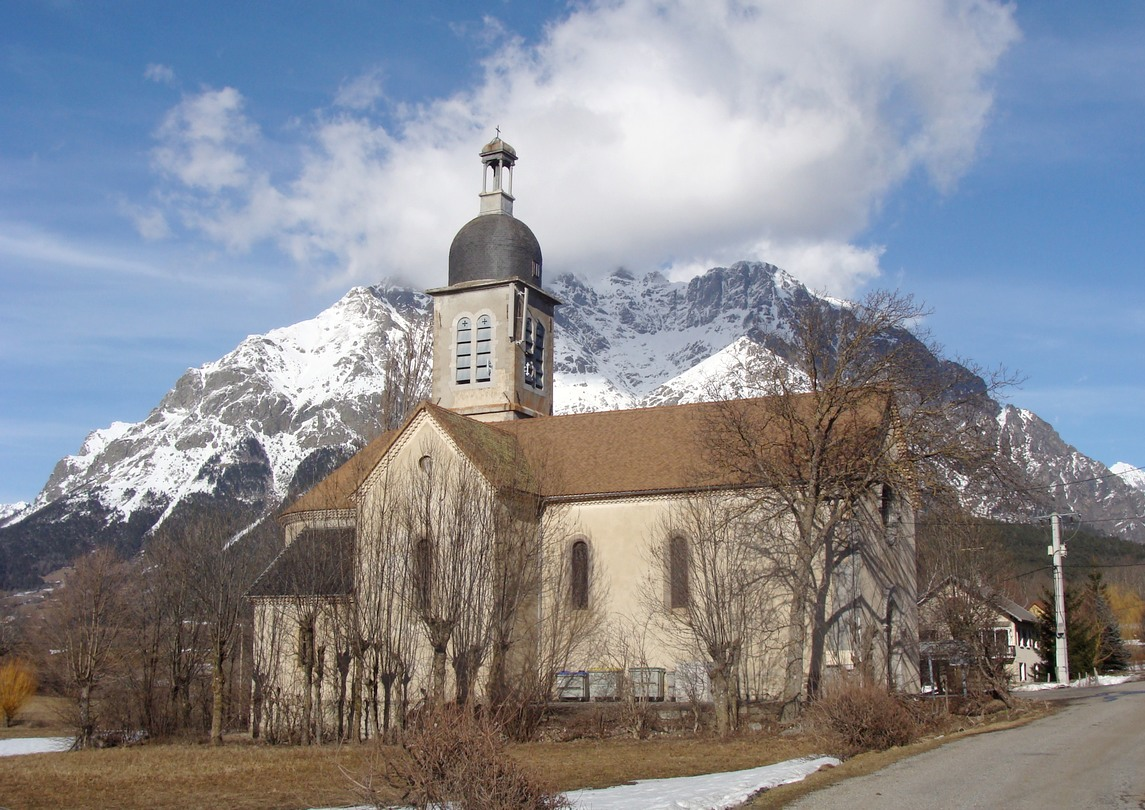
- The church of Saint-Eusèbe-en-Champsaur
- Location of Saint-Eusèbe-en-Champsaur
- Location within France Location within Provence-Alpes-Côte d'Azur
- Coordinates: 44°43′36″N 6°01′42″E
- Country: France
- Region: Provence-Alpes-Côte d'Azur
- Department: Hautes-Alpes
- Arrondissement: Gap
- Canton: Saint-Bonnet-en-Champsaur
- Commune: Aubessagne
- Area^{1}: 7.83 km^{2} (3.02 sq mi)
- Elevation: 1,050 m (3,440 ft)
- Highest elevation: 1,221 m (4,006 ft)
- Lowest elevation: 850 m (2,790 ft)
- Population (2015): 150
  - Density: 19/km^{2} (50/sq mi)
- Time zone: UTC+01:00 (CET)
  - Summer (DST): UTC+02:00 (CEST)
- Postal code: 05500
- ^{1} French Land Register data, which excludes lakes, ponds, glaciers > 1 km^{2} (0.386 sq mi or 247 acres) and river estuaries.

Saint-Eusèbe-en-Champsaur (Vivaro-Alpine: Sant Esèbe de Champsaur) is a former commune in the Hautes-Alpes department in southeastern France. On 1 January 2018, it was merged into the new commune of Aubessagne.

== Population ==
Historical population
Year	Pop.	±% p.a.
2006	138	—
2011	146	+1.13%
2015	150	+0.68%
Source: INSEE

== See also ==
- Communes of the Hautes-Alpes department
