= Col de la Croix de Fer =

Mountain pass in the French Alps

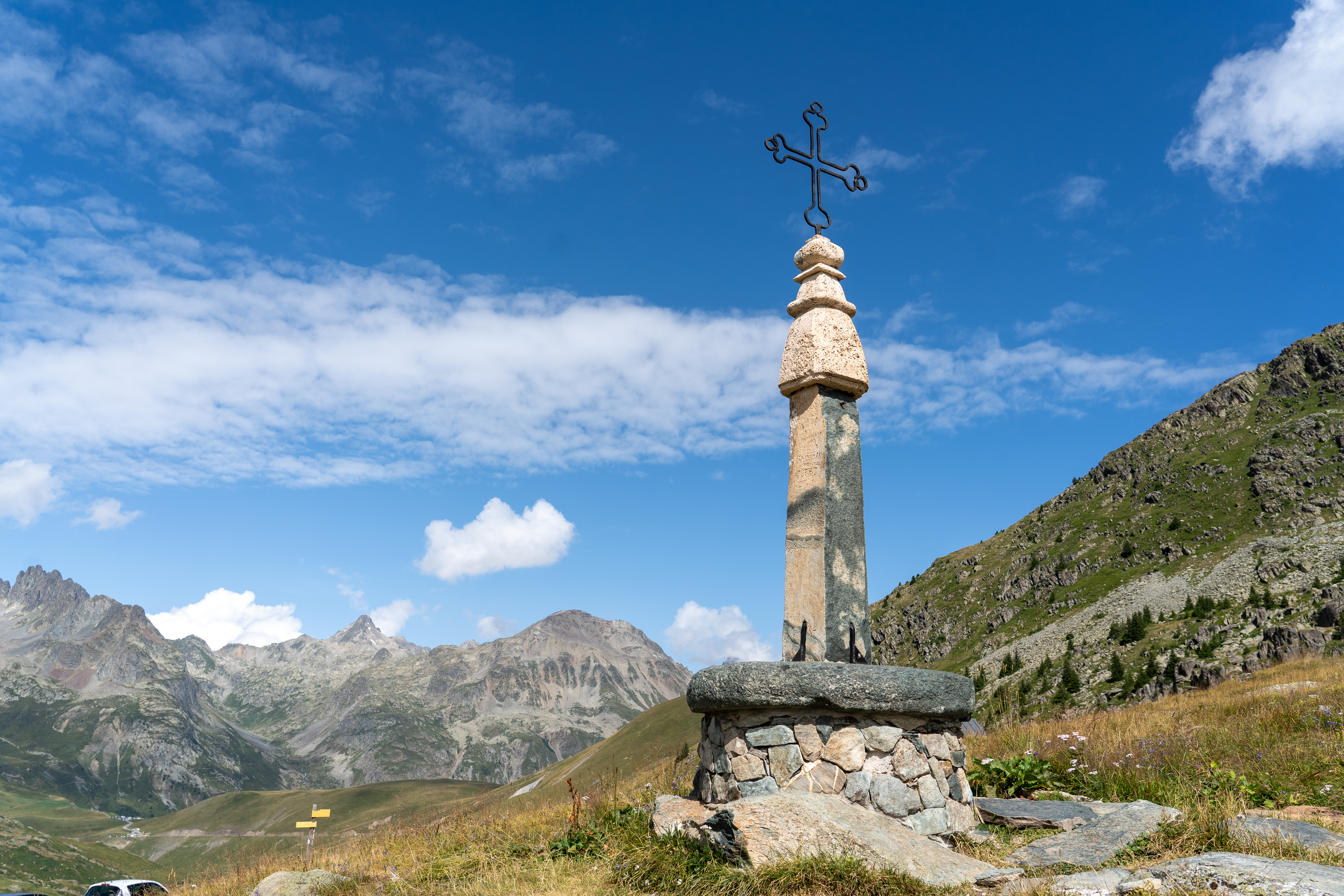
- The cross at Col de la Croix de Fer.

- Location within Alps
- Elevation: 2,067 m (6,781 ft)
- Traversed by: D 926

Third Approach
- Location: Savoie, France
- Range: Dauphiné Alps
- Coordinates: 45°13′39″N 06°12′12″E

Col de la Croix de Fer (English: Pass of the Iron Cross) (el. 2067 m.) is a high mountain pass in the French Alps linking Le Bourg-d'Oisans and Saint-Jean-de-Maurienne.

== Details of climb ==
The approach from the northeast from Saint-Jean-de-Maurienne is 29.5 km at an average gradient of 5.5% with some sections at 9.5%, and the one from the southwest from Rochetaillée 31.5 km at an average gradient of 5.75% with short sections in excess of 11%. When coming from Rochetaillée, the road forks 2.5 km before the summit, leading to the Col du Glandon. There is also an approach from the north from La Chambre via Col du Glandon which is the hardest: 22.7 km at an average gradient of 7.0% (this is the route used for the 2012 Tour de France).

== Tour de France ==
The pass has featured in the Tour de France twenty two times since it was first passed in the 1947 tour when the race was led over the summit by Fermo Camellini. It was crossed on Stage 11 of the 2012 race, between Albertville and La Toussuire-Les Sybelles. In the 2015 race it was passed twice in the two finale mountain stages stage 19 between Saint-Jean-de-Maurienne to La Toussuire – Les Sybelles, and from the other side in stage 20 between Modane to Alpe d'Huez. The route for stage 20 was changed in June 2015 caused by a landslide in April so Col de la Croix de Fer substitutes both Col du Télégraphe and Col du Galibier.

=== Appearances in Tour de France ===
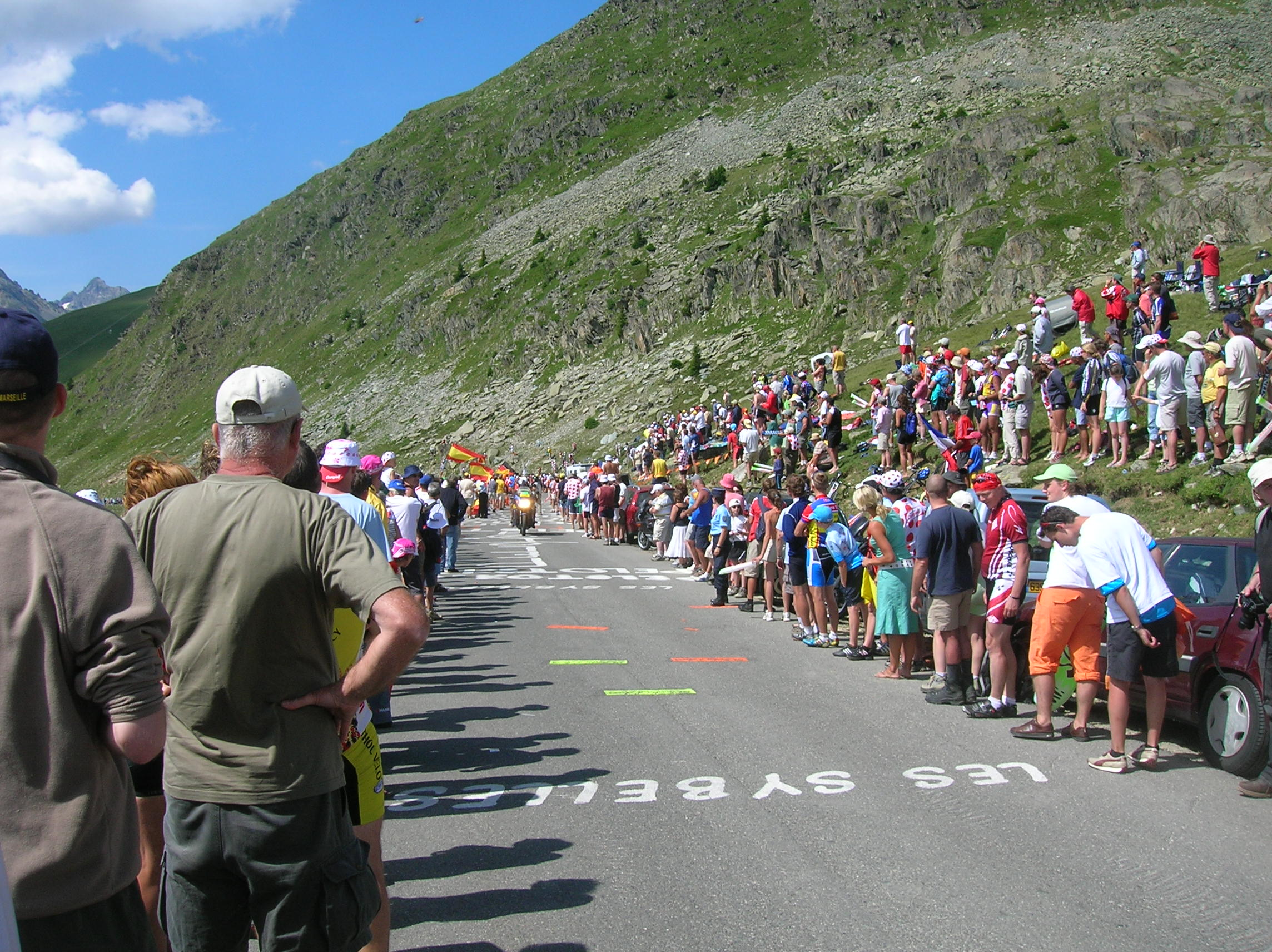
Tour de France at the Col de la Croix de Fer, 2006

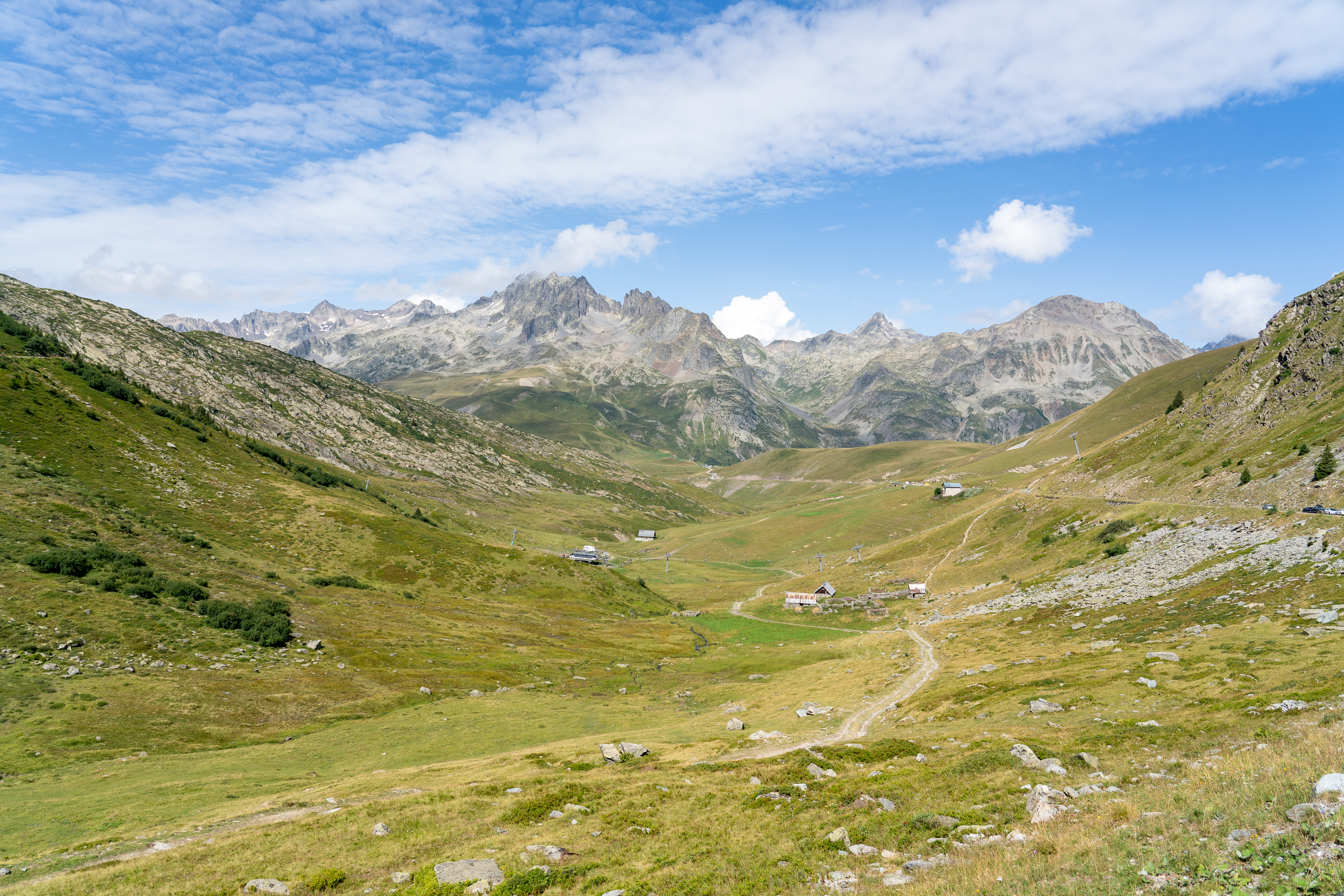
View on the Valley.

Year	Stage	Category	Start	Finish	Leader at the summit
2026	20	HC	Le Bourg-d'Oisans	Alpe d'Huez	Richard Carapaz (ECU)
2022	12	HC	Briançon	Alpe d'Huez	Giulio Ciccone (ITA)
2018	12	HC	Bourg-Saint-Maurice	Alpe d'Huez	Steven Kruijswijk (NED)
2017	17	HC	La Mure	Serre Chevalier	Thomas De Gendt (BEL)
2015	20	HC	Modane	Alpe d'Huez	Alexandre Geniez (FRA)
2015	19	HC	Saint-Jean-de-Maurienne	La Toussuire-Les Sybelles	Pierre Rolland (FRA)
2012	11	HC	Albertville	La Toussuire-Les Sybelles	Fredrik Kessiakoff (SWE)
2008	17	HC	Embrun	Alpe d'Huez	Peter Velits (SVK)
2006	16	HC	Le Bourg-d'Oisans	La Toussuire	Michael Rasmussen (DEN)
1999	10	HC	Sestrières	Alpe d'Huez	Stéphane Heulot (FRA)
1998	15	HC	Grenoble	Les Deux Alpes	Rodolfo Massi (ITA)
1995	10	HC	Aime–La Plagne	Alpe d'Huez	Richard Virenque (FRA)
1992	14	HC	Sestrières	Alpe d'Huez	Éric Boyer (FRA)
1989	17	HC	Briançon	Alpe d'Huez	Gert-Jan Theunisse (NED)
1986	18	1	Briançon–Serre Chevalier	Alpe d'Huez	Bernard Hinault (FRA)
1966	16	1	Bourg-d'Oisans	Briançon	Joaquim Galera (ESP)
1963	16	1	Grenoble	Val-d'Isère	Claude Mattio (FRA)
1961	10	1	Grenoble	Turin	Guy Ignolin (FRA)
1956	18	1	Turin	Grenoble	René Marigil (ESP)
1952	11	1	Bourg-d'Oisans	Sestrières	Fausto Coppi (ITA)
1948	14	1	Briançon	Aix-les-Bains	Gino Bartali (ITA)
1947	8	1	Grenoble	Briançon	Fermo Camellini (ITA)

== See also ==
- List of highest paved roads in Europe
- List of mountain passes
- Souvenir Henri Desgrange
