= Aubessagne =

- Commune
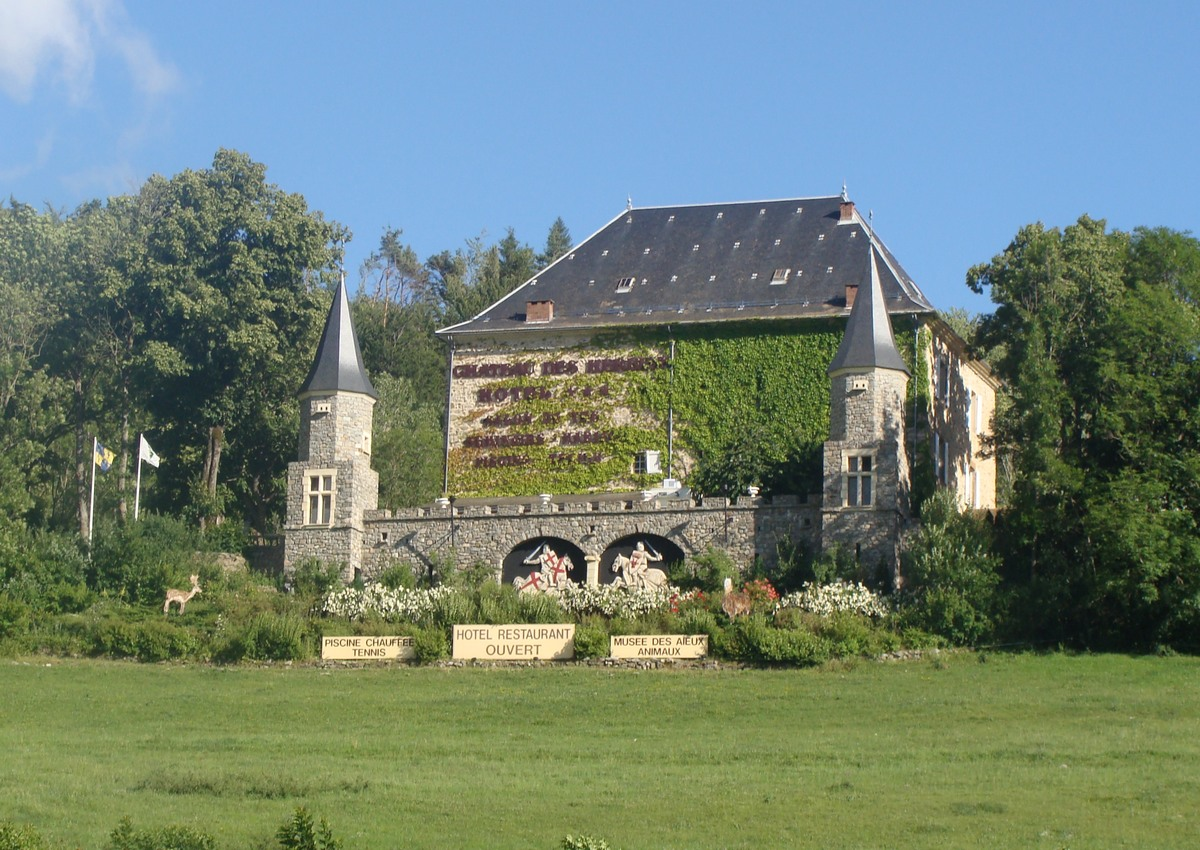
- Location of Aubessagne
- Location within France Location within Provence-Alpes-Côte d'Azur
- Coordinates: 44°45′18″N 6°00′34″E
- Country: France
- Region: Provence-Alpes-Côte d'Azur
- Department: Hautes-Alpes
- Arrondissement: Gap
- Canton: Saint-Bonnet-en-Champsaur
- Intercommunality: Champsaur-Valgaudemar

Government
  - Mayor (2026–32): Richard Achin
- Area^{1}: 27.51 km^{2} (10.62 sq mi)
- Population (2023): 740
  - Density: 27/km^{2} (70/sq mi)
- Time zone: UTC+01:00 (CET)
  - Summer (DST): UTC+02:00 (CEST)
- INSEE/Postal code: 05039 /05500, 05800
- ^{1} French Land Register data, which excludes lakes, ponds, glaciers > 1 km^{2} (0.386 sq mi or 247 acres) and river estuaries.

Aubessagne (Occitan: Aubessanha) is a commune in the department of Hautes-Alpes, southeastern France. The municipality was established on 1 January 2018 by merger of the former communes of Chauffayer (the seat), Saint-Eusèbe-en-Champsaur and Les Costes.

== See also ==
- Communes of the Hautes-Alpes department
