= Col du Glandon =

Mountain pass in Savoie, France

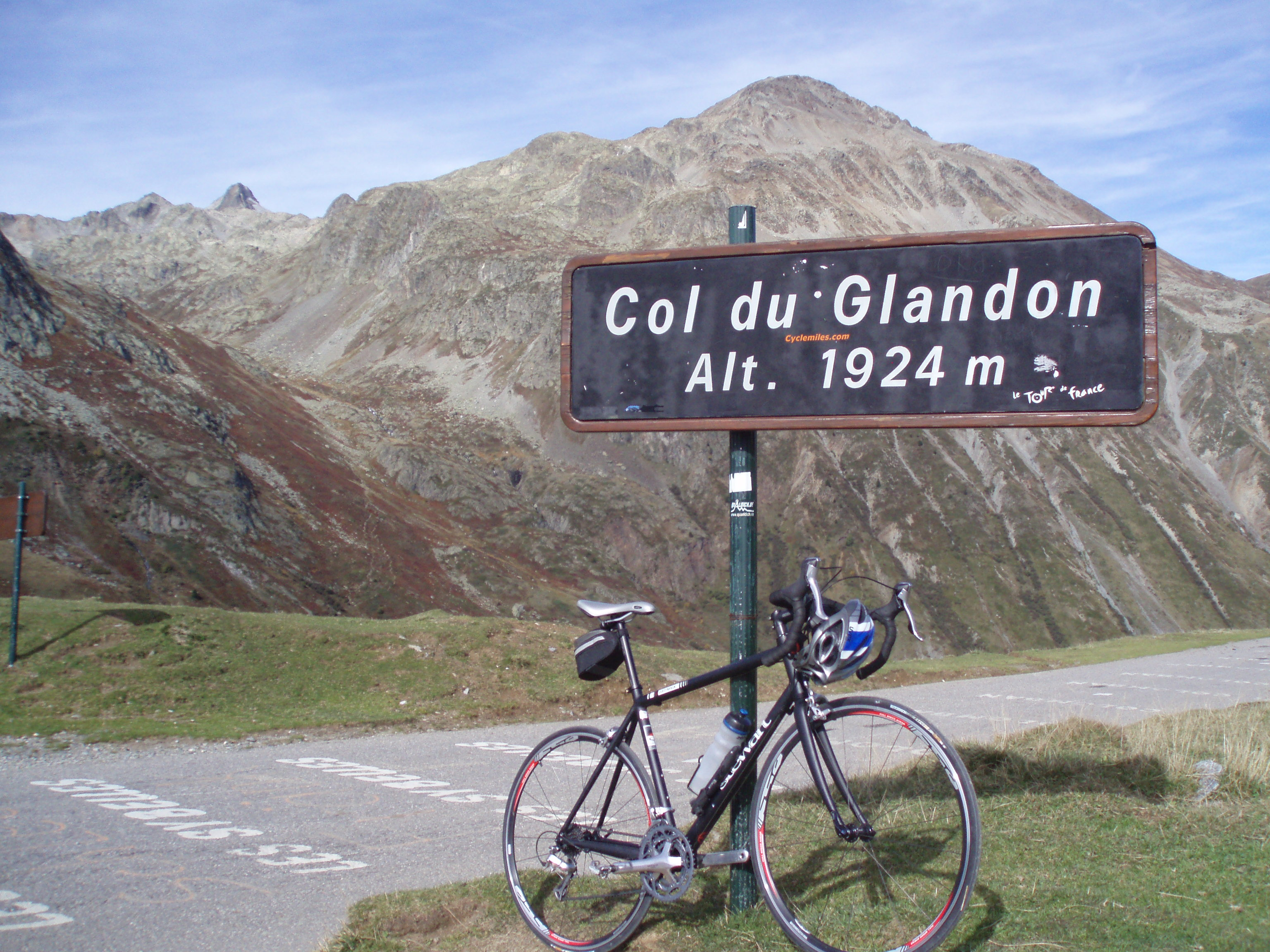

- Location within Alps
- Elevation: 1,924 m (6,312 ft)
- Traversed by: D927 road

Third Approach
- Location: Savoie, France
- Range: Dauphiné Alps
- Coordinates: 45°14′22″N 6°10′32″E

Col du Glandon (1,924 m (6,312 ft)) is a high mountain pass in the Dauphiné Alps in Savoie, France, linking Le Bourg-d'Oisans to La Chambre. It is situated between the Belledonne, Grandes Rousses and Arvan-Villards mountain ranges, west of the Col de la Croix de Fer. The road over the Col du Glandon was opened in 1898, although it was not linked to the Col de la Croix de Fer until 1912.

The pass is normally closed from the beginning of November to mid May. It is sometimes used by the Tour de France cycle race, including on the 2013 Tour. The climb was also featured in Stage 18 of the 2025 Tour de France.

== Details of the climb ==
From La Chambre (north-east) the climb follows the D927. The ascent is 21.3 km (13.2 mi) long, climbing 1,472 m (4,829 ft) at an average gradient of 6.9%. The gradient increases as the road approaches the summit, with the last two kilometres exceeding 10% with stretches at 12%.

From Le Bourg-d'Oisans the route follows the D1091 through the Romanche valley before joining the D526 after 8 km (5 mi). The climb starts at the Barrage du Verney from where there is a further 24.1 km (15.0 mi) to the summit, which is reached shortly after the junction with the route to Col de la Croix de Fer. Over this distance, the height gained is 1,152 m (3,780 ft); the average gradient is thus 4.8%, although there are some downhill sections en route and a maximum uphill gradient of 11.1%.

In the climb from La Chambre mountain pass cycling milestones are placed every kilometre. They indicate the distance to the summit, the current height, and the average slope in the following kilometre. Such signposting for cyclists has become common in most major mountain passes in the French Pyrenees and Alps.

== Tour de France ==
The Col du Glandon was first crossed in the Tour de France in 1947 in conjunction with the Col de la Croix de Fer when the first rider over the summit was Edward Klabiński. The pass is often used in conjunction with the Col de la Croix de Fer when it is not categorized for the King of the Mountains competition.

=== Categorized appearances in Tour de France ===
Year	Stage	Category	Start	Finish	Leader at the summit
2025	18	HC	Vif	Col de la Loze	Lenny Martinez (FRA)
2015	18	HC	Gap	Saint-Jean-de-Maurienne	Romain Bardet (FRA)
2013	19	HC	Le Bourg-d'Oisans	Le Grand-Bornand	Ryder Hesjedal (CAN)
2004	17	1	Le Bourg-d'Oisans	Le Grand-Bornand	Gilberto Simoni (ITA)
2001	10	HC	Aix-les-Bains	Alpe d'Huez	Laurent Roux (FRA)
1997	14	1	Le Bourg-d'Oisans	Courchevel	Richard Virenque (FRA)
1994	17	1	Le Bourg-d'Oisans	Val Thorens	Richard Virenque (FRA)
1993	10	1	Villard-de-Lans	Serre-Chevalier	Stefano Colagè (ITA)
1990	11	1	Saint-Gervais-les-Bains	Alpe d'Huez	Thierry Claveyrolat (FRA)
1988	12	HC	Morzine	Alpe d'Huez	Steven Rooks (NED)
1983	18	1	Le Bourg-d'Oisans	Morzine	Serge Demierre (SUI)
1983	17	1	La Tour-du-Pin	Alpe d'Huez	Lucien Van Impe (BEL)
1981	19	HC	Morzine	Alpe d'Huez	Lucien Van Impe (BEL)
1977	17	1	Chamonix	Alpe d'Huez	Lucien Van Impe (BEL)

== Tour de France Femmes ==
The Col du Glandon was crossed on Stage 8 of the 2024 Tour de France Femmes.

Year	Stage	Category	Start	Finish	Leader at the summit
2024	8	HC	Le Grand-Bornand	Alpe d'Huez	Demi Vollering (NED)

== See also ==
- List of highest paved roads in Europe
- List of mountain passes
