= Les Costes =

- Part of Aubessagne
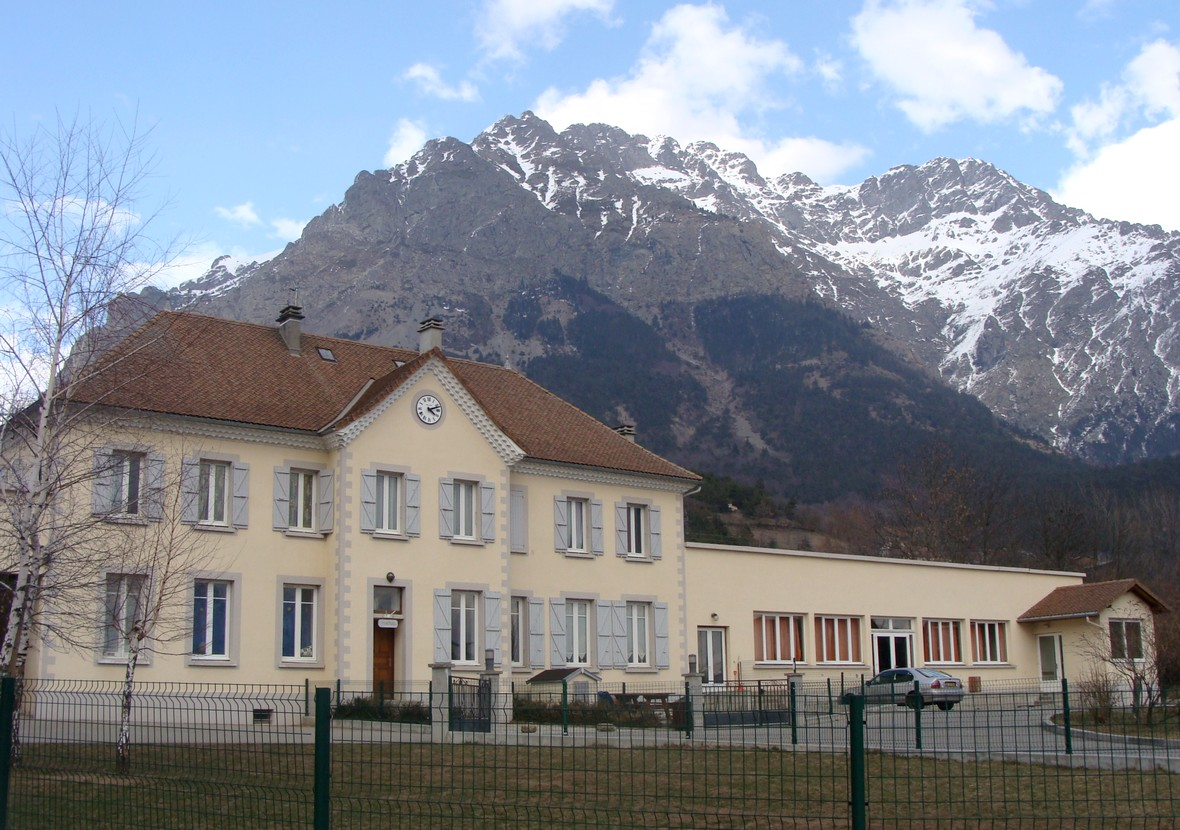
- The town hall, with the Banc du Peyron in the background
- Location of Les Costes
- Location within France Location within Provence-Alpes-Côte d'Azur
- Coordinates: 44°44′48″N 6°02′05″E
- Country: France
- Region: Provence-Alpes-Côte d'Azur
- Department: Hautes-Alpes
- Arrondissement: Gap
- Canton: Saint-Bonnet-en-Champsaur
- Commune: Aubessagne
- Area^{1}: 8.78 km^{2} (3.39 sq mi)
- Elevation: 1,110 m (3,640 ft)
- Highest elevation: 2,776 m (9,108 ft)
- Lowest elevation: 1,043 m (3,422 ft)
- Population (2015): 178
  - Density: 20.3/km^{2} (52.5/sq mi)
- Time zone: UTC+01:00 (CET)
  - Summer (DST): UTC+02:00 (CEST)
- Postal code: 05500
- ^{1} French Land Register data, which excludes lakes, ponds, glaciers > 1 km^{2} (0.386 sq mi or 247 acres) and river estuaries.

Les Costes (Vivaro-Alpine: Las Còstas) is a former commune in the Hautes-Alpes department in southeastern France. On 1 January 2018, it was merged into the new commune of Aubessagne.

== Population ==
Historical population
Year	Pop.	±% p.a.
2006	142	—
2011	161	+2.54%
2015	178	+2.54%
Source: INSEE

== See also ==
- Communes of the Hautes-Alpes department
