= Payssous =

- Commune
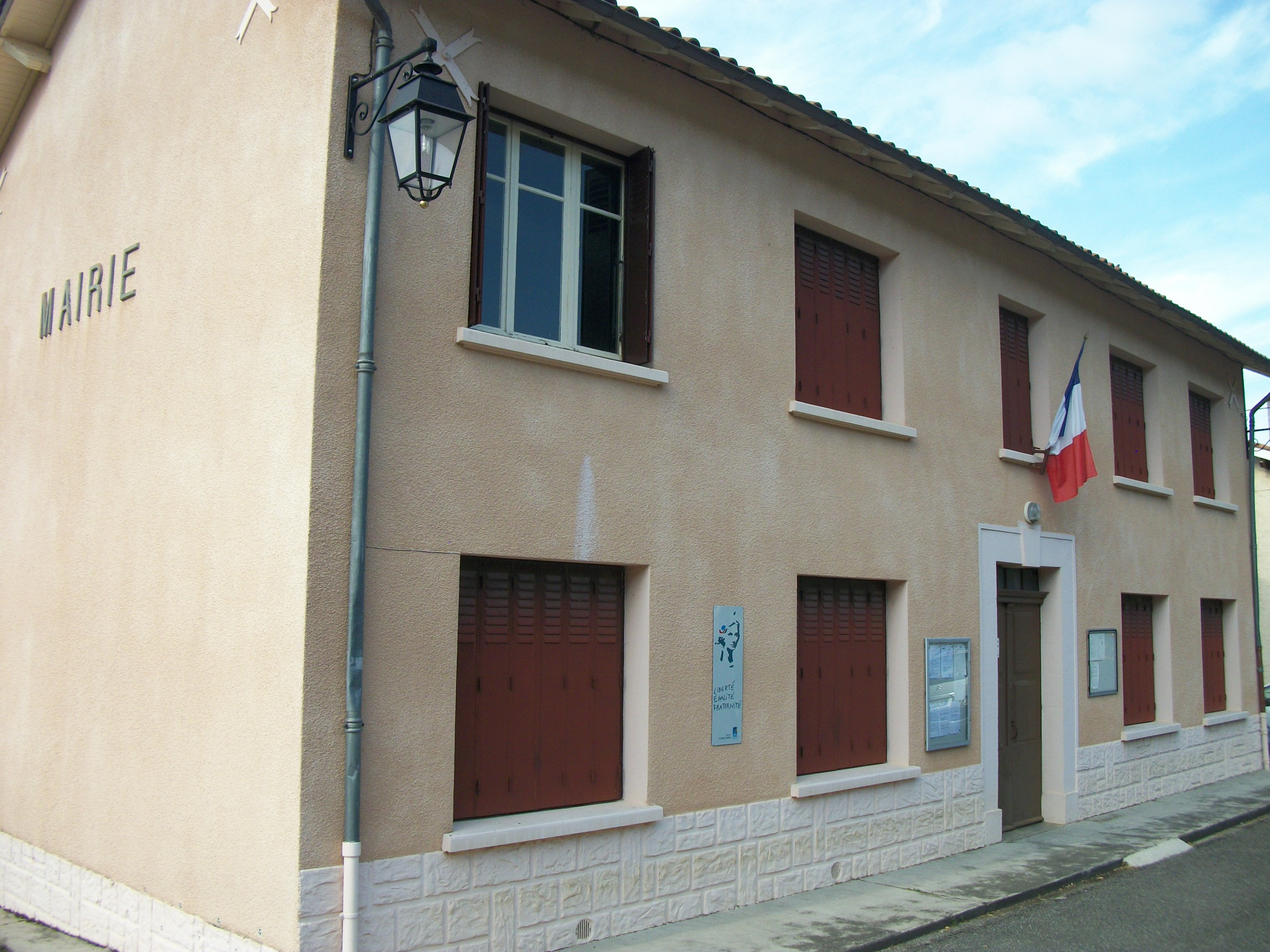
- Location of Payssous
- Location within France Location within Occitanie
- Coordinates: 43°02′06″N 0°42′48″E
- Country: France
- Region: Occitania
- Department: Haute-Garonne
- Arrondissement: Saint-Gaudens
- Canton: Bagnères-de-Luchon

Government
  - Mayor (2020–2026): Jacques Renaud
- Area^{1}: 4.08 km^{2} (1.58 sq mi)
- Elevation: 450 m (1,480 ft)
- Highest elevation: 790 m (2,590 ft)
- Lowest elevation: 388 m (1,273 ft)
- Population (2023): 80
  - Density: 20/km^{2} (51/sq mi)
- Time zone: UTC+01:00 (CET)
  - Summer (DST): UTC+02:00 (CEST)
- INSEE/Postal code: 31408 /31510
- ^{1} French Land Register data, which excludes lakes, ponds, glaciers > 1 km^{2} (0.386 sq mi or 247 acres) and river estuaries.

Payssous (Occitan: Païses Sota) is a commune in the Haute-Garonne department in southwestern France.

== Population ==
Historical population
Year	Pop.	±% p.a.
1968	156	—
1975	138	−1.74%
1982	108	−3.44%
1990	88	−2.53%
1999	80	−1.05%
2007	92	+1.76%
2012	90	−0.44%
2017	90	+0.00%
2023	80	−1.94%
Source: INSEE

== See also ==
- Communes of the Haute-Garonne department
