= Chauffayer =

- Part of Aubessagne
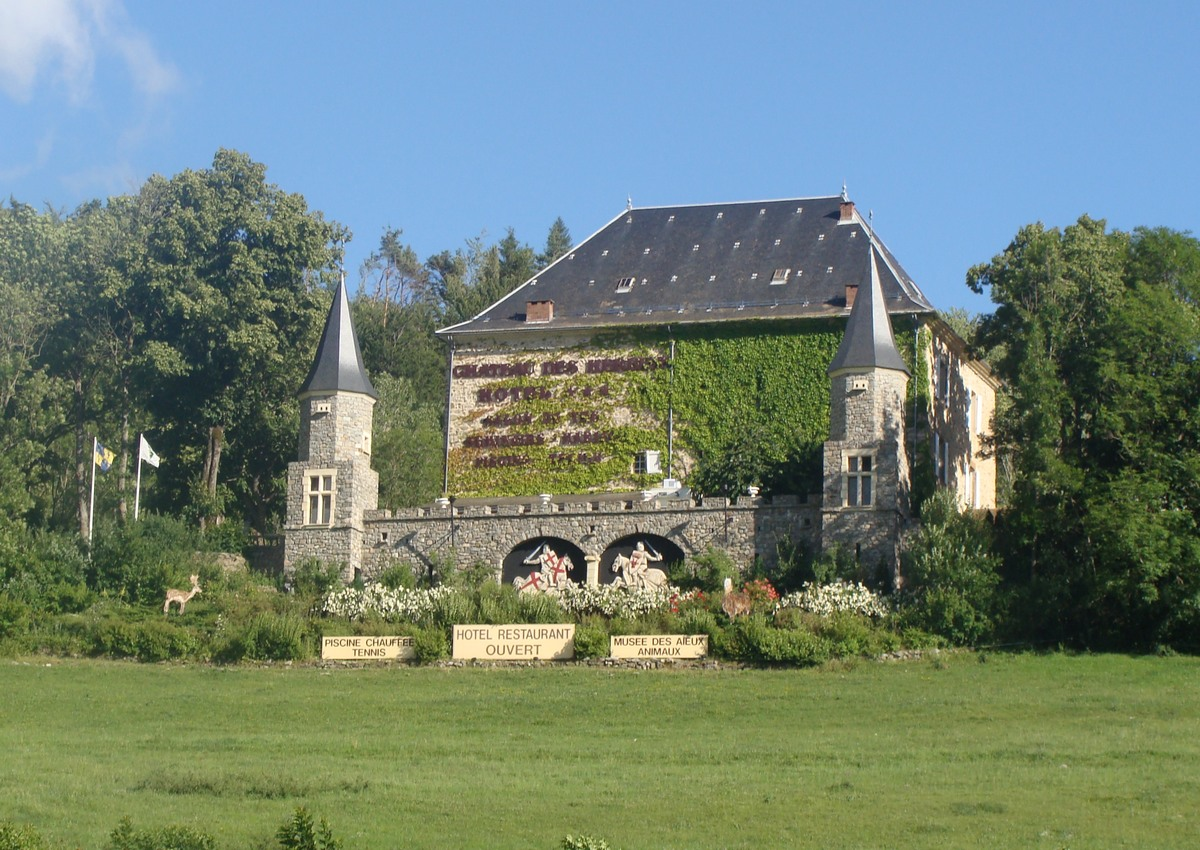
- Château des Herbeys

- Coat of arms
- Location of Chauffayer
- Location within France Location within Provence-Alpes-Côte d'Azur
- Coordinates: 44°45′18″N 6°00′34″E
- Country: France
- Region: Provence-Alpes-Côte d'Azur
- Department: Hautes-Alpes
- Arrondissement: Gap
- Canton: Saint-Bonnet-en-Champsaur
- Commune: Aubessagne
- Area^{1}: 10.9 km^{2} (4.2 sq mi)
- Elevation: 910 m (2,990 ft)
- Highest elevation: 1,132 m (3,714 ft)
- Lowest elevation: 775 m (2,543 ft)
- Population (2015): 383
  - Density: 35.1/km^{2} (91.0/sq mi)
- Time zone: UTC+01:00 (CET)
  - Summer (DST): UTC+02:00 (CEST)
- Postal code: 05800
- ^{1} French Land Register data, which excludes lakes, ponds, glaciers > 1 km^{2} (0.386 sq mi or 247 acres) and river estuaries.

Chauffayer (Vivaro-Alpine: Chaufaier) is a former commune in the Hautes-Alpes department in southeastern France. On 1 January 2018, it was merged into the new commune of Aubessagne.

== Population ==
Historical population
Year	Pop.	±% p.a.
2006	377	—
2011	391	+0.73%
2015	383	−0.52%
Source: INSEE

== See also ==
- Communes of the Hautes-Alpes department
