= Sainte-Croix, Drôme =

Sainte-Croix
- Commune
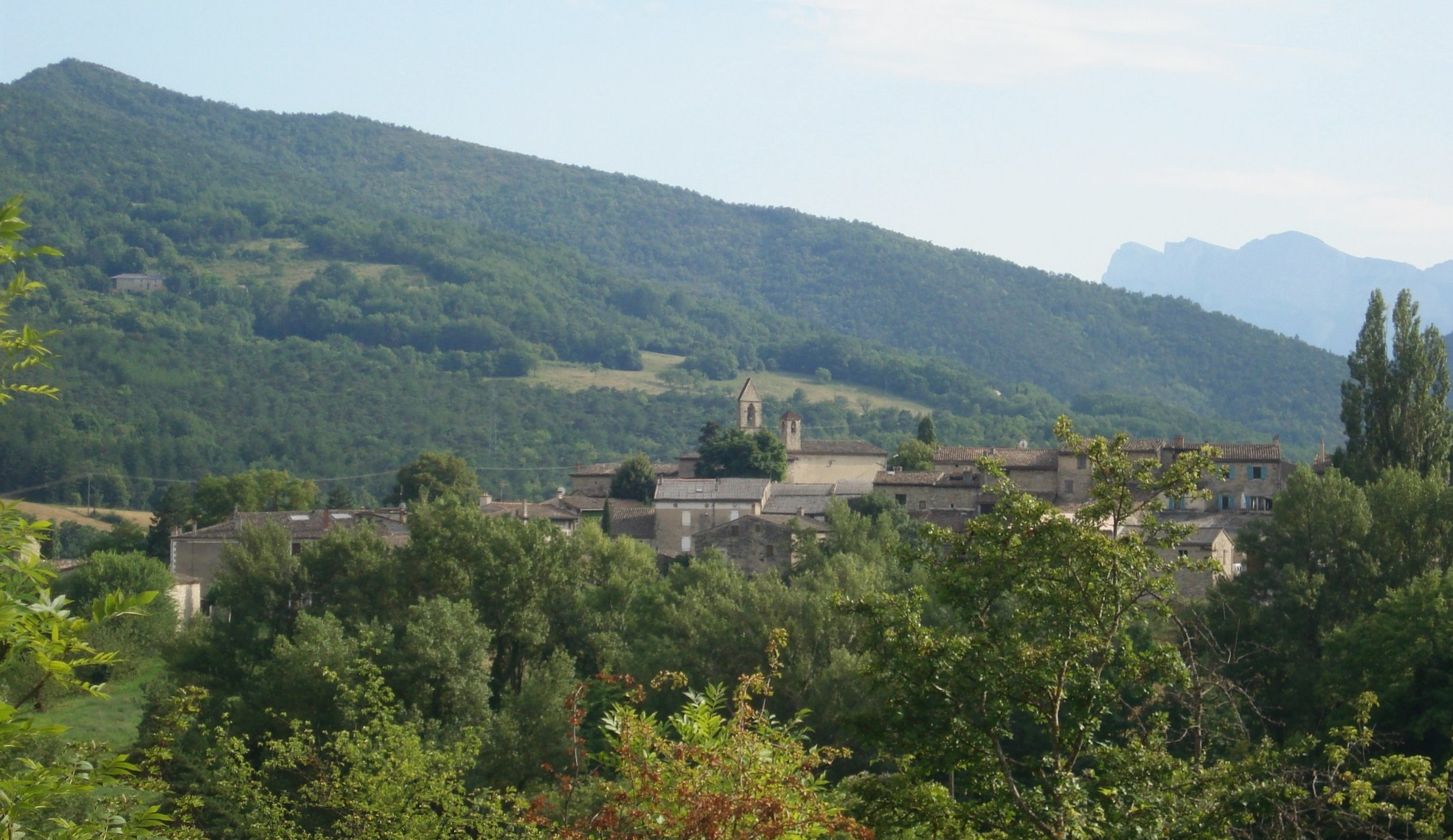
- A view of the village of Sainte-Croix
- Location of Sainte-Croix
- Location within France Location within Auvergne-Rhône-Alpes
- Coordinates: 44°46′09″N 5°17′02″E
- Country: France
- Region: Auvergne-Rhône-Alpes
- Department: Drôme
- Arrondissement: Die
- Canton: Le Diois
- Intercommunality: Diois

Government
  - Mayor (2020–2026): Nadine Monge
- Area^{1}: 10.78 km^{2} (4.16 sq mi)
- Elevation: 400 m (1,300 ft)
- Highest elevation: 1,014 m (3,327 ft)
- Lowest elevation: 333 m (1,093 ft)
- Population (2023): 104
  - Density: 9.65/km^{2} (25.0/sq mi)
- Time zone: UTC+01:00 (CET)
  - Summer (DST): UTC+02:00 (CEST)
- INSEE/Postal code: 26299 /26150
- ^{1} French Land Register data, which excludes lakes, ponds, glaciers > 1 km^{2} (0.386 sq mi or 247 acres) and river estuaries.

Sainte-Croix (French pronunciation: [sɛ̃t kʁwa]; Vivaro-Alpine: Santa Crotz) is a commune in the Drôme department in southeastern France.

== Population ==
Historical population
Year	Pop.	±% p.a.
1968	110	—
1975	90	−2.83%
1982	92	+0.31%
1990	102	+1.30%
1999	90	−1.38%
2007	91	+0.14%
2012	86	−1.12%
2017	106	+4.27%
2023	104	−0.32%
Source: INSEE

== See also ==
- Communes of the Drôme department
- Parc naturel régional du Vercors
