= List of teams and cyclists in the 2025 Tour de France =

List of cyclists

The following is a list of teams and cyclists who participated in the 2025 Tour de France.

== Teams ==
Twenty-three teams took part in the race. All 18 UCI WorldTeams were automatically invited. They were joined by five UCI ProTeams: the two highest ranked UCI ProTeams in 2024 (Lotto and Israel–Premier Tech), along with three teams (Team TotalEnergies, Tudor Pro Cycling Team and Uno-X Mobility) selected by Amaury Sport Organisation (ASO), the organisers of the Tour.

Union Cycliste Internationale (UCI) rules allow 22 teams to enter a Grand Tour – 18 UCI WorldTeams, the two highest ranked UCI ProTeams from the previous season and two teams invited by the organisers. Grand Tour race organisers ASO and RCS Sport asked the UCI to allow an additional wildcard team to be invited to Grand Tour events, after lobbying from smaller teams competing for the wildcard slots. Larger teams were reported to not support the request, with Visma–Lease a Bike noting that an additional team would decrease safety. In March 2025, the UCI announced that 23 teams would be permitted in 2025, allowing an additional ProTeam to be invited. ASO subsequently announced the teams on 31 March 2025.

A total of 184 riders from 27 nationalities started the race, with the France having the largest contingent (38 riders). 160 riders reached the finish in Paris, one of the lowest drop out rates in the 21st century.

=== UCI WorldTeams ===
- Alpecin–Deceuninck
- Arkéa–B&B Hotels
- Cofidis
- Decathlon–AG2R La Mondiale
- EF Education–EasyPost
- Groupama–FDJ
- INEOS Grenadiers
- Intermarché–Wanty
- Lidl–Trek
- Movistar Team
- Red Bull–Bora–Hansgrohe
- Soudal–Quick-Step
- Team Bahrain Victorious
- Team Picnic–PostNL
- Team Jayco–AlUla
- UAE Team Emirates XRG
- Visma–Lease a Bike
- XDS Astana Team

=== UCI ProTeams ===
- Israel–Premier Tech
- Lotto
- Team TotalEnergies
- Tudor Pro Cycling Team
- Uno-X Mobility

== Cyclists ==
Legend
No.	Starting number worn by the rider during the Tour
Pos.	Position in the general classification
Time	Deficit to the winner of the general classification
‡	Denotes riders born on or after 1 January 2000 eligible for the young rider classification
General classification	Denotes the winner of the general classification
Points classification	Denotes the winner of the points classification
Mountains classification	Denotes the winner of the mountains classification
Young rider classification	Denotes the winner of the young rider classification (eligibility indicated by ‡)
Team classification	Denotes riders that represent the winner of the team classification
	Denotes the winner of the super-combativity award
DNS	Denotes a rider who did not start a stage, followed by the stage before which he withdrew
DNF	Denotes a rider who did not finish a stage, followed by the stage in which he withdrew
DSQ	Denotes a rider who was disqualified from the race, followed by the stage in which this occurred
OTL	Denotes a rider finished outside the time limit, followed by the stage in which they did so
Ages correct as of Saturday 5 July 2025, the date on which the Tour began

=== By starting number ===
No.	Name	Nationality	Team	Age	Pos.	Time	Ref.
1	Tadej Pogačar	Slovenia	UAE Team Emirates XRG	26	1	76h 00' 32"	
2	João Almeida	Portugal	UAE Team Emirates XRG	26	DNF-9	–	
3	Jhonatan Narváez	Ecuador	UAE Team Emirates XRG	28	13	+ 1h 04' 36"	
4	Nils Politt	Germany	UAE Team Emirates XRG	31	75	+ 3h 44' 45"	
5	Pavel Sivakov	France	UAE Team Emirates XRG	27	87	+ 3h 54' 19"	
6	Marc Soler	Spain	UAE Team Emirates XRG	31	29	+ 2h 21' 01"	
7	Tim Wellens	Belgium	UAE Team Emirates XRG	34	37	+ 2h 38' 24"	
8	Adam Yates	Great Britain	UAE Team Emirates XRG	32	24	+ 1h 48' 41"	
11	Jonas Vingegaard	Denmark	Visma–Lease a Bike	28	2	+ 4' 24"	
12	Edoardo Affini	Italy	Visma–Lease a Bike	29	118	+ 4h 54' 53"	
13	Tiesj Benoot	Belgium	Visma–Lease a Bike	31	54	+ 3h 10' 19"	
14	Victor Campenaerts	Belgium	Visma–Lease a Bike	33	28	+ 2h 20' 36"	
15	Matteo Jorgenson	United States	Visma–Lease a Bike	26	19	+ 1h 29' 28"	
16	Sepp Kuss	United States	Visma–Lease a Bike	30	17	+ 1h 20' 24"	
17	Wout van Aert	Belgium	Visma–Lease a Bike	30	67	+ 3h 33' 56"	
18	Simon Yates	Great Britain	Visma–Lease a Bike	32	15	+ 1h 17' 30"	
21	Remco Evenepoel ‡	Belgium	Soudal–Quick-Step	25	DNF-14	–	
22	Mattia Cattaneo	Italy	Soudal–Quick-Step	34	DNF-7	–	
23	Pascal Eenkhoorn	Netherlands	Soudal–Quick-Step	28	49	+ 3h 00' 25"	
24	Tim Merlier	Belgium	Soudal–Quick-Step	32	148	+ 5h 37' 19"	
25	Valentin Paret-Peintre ‡	France	Soudal–Quick-Step	24	41	+ 2h 47' 05"	
26	Maximilian Schachmann	Germany	Soudal–Quick-Step	31	68	+ 3h 35' 01"	
27	Bert Van Lerberghe	Belgium	Soudal–Quick-Step	32	147	+ 5h 36' 47"	
28	Ilan Van Wilder ‡	Belgium	Soudal–Quick-Step	25	32	+ 2h 23' 14"	
31	Ben Healy ‡	Ireland	EF Education–EasyPost	24	9	+ 28' 02"	
32	Vincenzo Albanese	Italy	EF Education–EasyPost	28	114	+ 4h 48' 20"	
33	Kasper Asgreen	Denmark	EF Education–EasyPost	30	91	+ 3h 58' 25"	
34	Alex Baudin ‡	France	EF Education–EasyPost	24	46	+ 2h 56' 15"	
35	Neilson Powless	United States	EF Education–EasyPost	28	47	+ 2h 58' 52"	
36	Harry Sweeny	Australia	EF Education–EasyPost	26	35	+ 2h 27' 58"	
37	Michael Valgren	Denmark	EF Education–EasyPost	33	72	+ 3h 37' 01"	
38	Marijn van den Berg	Netherlands	EF Education–EasyPost	25	DNS-10	–	
41	Biniam Girmay ‡	Eritrea	Intermarché–Wanty	25	132	+ 5h 14' 55"	
42	Louis Barré ‡	France	Intermarché–Wanty	25	82	+ 3h 51' 34"	
43	Vito Braet ‡	Belgium	Intermarché–Wanty	24	143	+ 5h 32' 04"	
44	Hugo Page ‡	France	Intermarché–Wanty	23	138	+ 5h 24' 23"	
45	Laurenz Rex	Belgium	Intermarché–Wanty	25	141	+ 5h 29' 16"	
46	Jonas Rutsch	Germany	Intermarché–Wanty	27	128	+ 5h 11' 07"	
47	Roel van Sintmaartensdijk ‡	Netherlands	Intermarché–Wanty	24	156	+ 5h 44' 11"	
48	Georg Zimmermann	Germany	Intermarché–Wanty	27	DNS-10	–	
51	Santiago Buitrago	Colombia	Team Bahrain Victorious	25	40	+ 2h 45' 48"	
52	Phil Bauhaus	Germany	Team Bahrain Victorious	30	151	+ 5h 39' 29"	
53	Kamil Gradek	Poland	Team Bahrain Victorious	34	155	+ 5h 43' 51"	
54	Jack Haig	Australia	Team Bahrain Victorious	31	DNF-7	–	
55	Lenny Martinez ‡	France	Team Bahrain Victorious	21	79	+ 3h 48' 37"	
56	Matej Mohorič	Slovenia	Team Bahrain Victorious	30	126	+ 5h 10' 13"	
57	Robert Stannard	Australia	Team Bahrain Victorious	26	123	+ 5h 03' 30"	
58	Fred Wright	Great Britain	Team Bahrain Victorious	26	104	+ 4h 22' 52"	
61	Geraint Thomas	Great Britain	INEOS Grenadiers	39	58	+ 3h 14' 57"	
62	Thymen Arensman	Netherlands	INEOS Grenadiers	25	12	+ 52' 41"	
63	Tobias Foss	Norway	INEOS Grenadiers	28	70	+ 3h 35' 15"	
64	Filippo Ganna	Italy	INEOS Grenadiers	28	DNF-1	–	
65	Axel Laurance ‡	France	INEOS Grenadiers	24	53	+ 3h 10' 10"	
66	Carlos Rodríguez ‡	Spain	INEOS Grenadiers	24	DNS-18	–	
67	Connor Swift	Great Britain	INEOS Grenadiers	29	109	+ 4h 40' 30"	
68	Samuel Watson ‡	Great Britain	INEOS Grenadiers	23	115	+ 4h 50' 14"	
71	Primož Roglič	Slovenia	Red Bull–Bora–Hansgrohe	35	8	+ 25' 30"	
72	Florian Lipowitz ‡	Germany	Red Bull–Bora–Hansgrohe	24	3	+ 11' 00"	
73	Jordi Meeus	Belgium	Red Bull–Bora–Hansgrohe	27	158	+ 5h 48' 25"	
74	Gianni Moscon	Italy	Red Bull–Bora–Hansgrohe	31	105	+ 4h 30' 56"	
75	Laurence Pithie ‡	New Zealand	Red Bull–Bora–Hansgrohe	22	89	+ 3h 54' 44"	
76	Mick van Dijke ‡	Netherlands	Red Bull–Bora–Hansgrohe	25	113	+ 4h 46' 50"	
77	Danny van Poppel	Netherlands	Red Bull–Bora–Hansgrohe	31	DNS-17	–	
78	Aleksandr Vlasov		Red Bull–Bora–Hansgrohe	29	27	+ 2h 16' 15"	
81	Jonathan Milan ‡	Italy	Lidl–Trek	24	146	+ 5h 35' 35"	
82	Simone Consonni	Italy	Lidl–Trek	30	160	+ 5h 51' 40"	
83	Thibau Nys ‡	Belgium	Lidl–Trek	22	116	+ 4h 50' 42"	
84	Quinn Simmons ‡	United States	Lidl–Trek	24	59	+ 3h 17' 36"	
85	Mattias Skjelmose ‡	Denmark	Lidl–Trek	24	DNF-14	–	
86	Toms Skujiņš	Latvia	Lidl–Trek	34	95	+ 4h 04' 16"	
87	Jasper Stuyven	Belgium	Lidl–Trek	33	62	+ 3h 26' 11"	
88	Edward Theuns	Belgium	Lidl–Trek	34	159	+ 5h 51' 25"	
91	Guillaume Martin	France	Groupama–FDJ	32	16	+ 1h 18' 07"	
92	Lewis Askey ‡	Great Britain	Groupama–FDJ	24	127	+ 5h 10' 40"	
93	Cyril Barthe	France	Groupama–FDJ	29	DNS-18	–	
94	Romain Grégoire ‡	France	Groupama–FDJ	22	34	+ 2h 25' 58"	
95	Valentin Madouas	France	Groupama–FDJ	28	21	+ 1h 39' 46"	
96	Quentin Pacher	France	Groupama–FDJ	33	45	+ 2h 56' 00"	
97	Paul Penhoët ‡	France	Groupama–FDJ	23	111	+ 4h 44' 44"	
98	Clément Russo	France	Groupama–FDJ	30	93	+ 4h 01' 44"	
101	Jasper Philipsen	Belgium	Alpecin–Deceuninck	27	DNF-3	–	
102	Silvan Dillier	Switzerland	Alpecin–Deceuninck	34	131	+ 5h 14' 12"	
103	Kaden Groves	Australia	Alpecin–Deceuninck	26	86	+ 3h 53' 29"	
104	Xandro Meurisse	Belgium	Alpecin–Deceuninck	33	22	+ 1h 43' 46"	
105	Jonas Rickaert	Belgium	Alpecin–Deceuninck	31	98	+ 4h 11' 17"	
106	Mathieu van der Poel	Netherlands	Alpecin–Deceuninck	30	DNS-16	–	
107	Gianni Vermeersch	Belgium	Alpecin–Deceuninck	32	103	+ 4h 22' 29"	
108	Emiel Verstrynge ‡	Belgium	Alpecin–Deceuninck	23	65	+ 3h 28' 01"	
111	Julian Alaphilippe	France	Tudor Pro Cycling Team	33	56	+ 3h 13' 20"	
112	Alberto Dainese	Italy	Tudor Pro Cycling Team	27	119	+ 4h 56' 31"	
113	Marco Haller	Austria	Tudor Pro Cycling Team	34	97	+ 4h 09' 24"	
114	Marc Hirschi	Switzerland	Tudor Pro Cycling Team	26	78	+ 3h 48' 37"	
115	Fabian Lienhard	Switzerland	Tudor Pro Cycling Team	31	157	+ 5h 46' 00"	
116	Marius Mayrhofer ‡	Germany	Tudor Pro Cycling Team	24	83	+ 3h 53' 18"	
117	Michael Storer	Australia	Tudor Pro Cycling Team	28	42	+ 2h 50' 51"	
118	Matteo Trentin	Italy	Tudor Pro Cycling Team	35	99	+ 4h 12' 31"	
121	Ben O'Connor	Australia	Team Jayco–AlUla	29	11	+ 34' 34"	
122	Eddie Dunbar	Ireland	Team Jayco–AlUla	28	DNF-8	–	
123	Luke Durbridge	Australia	Team Jayco–AlUla	34	137	+ 5h 23' 21"	
124	Dylan Groenewegen	Netherlands	Team Jayco–AlUla	32	150	+ 5h 38' 24"	
125	Luka Mezgec	Slovenia	Team Jayco–AlUla	37	152	+ 5h 40' 08"	
126	Luke Plapp ‡	Australia	Team Jayco–AlUla	24	121	+ 5h 02' 34"	
127	Elmar Reinders	Netherlands	Team Jayco–AlUla	33	140	+ 5h 28' 50"	
128	Mauro Schmid	Switzerland	Team Jayco–AlUla	25	101	+ 4h 14' 00"	
131	Kévin Vauquelin ‡	France	Arkéa–B&B Hotels	24	7	+ 22' 35"	
132	Amaury Capiot	Belgium	Arkéa–B&B Hotels	32	136	+ 5h 22' 38"	
133	Ewen Costiou ‡	France	Arkéa–B&B Hotels	22	51	+ 3h 06' 35"	
134	Arnaud Démare	France	Arkéa–B&B Hotels	33	153	+ 5h 30' 45"	
135	Raúl García Pierna ‡	Spain	Arkéa–B&B Hotels	24	26	+ 2h 15' 58"	
136	Mathis Le Berre ‡	France	Arkéa–B&B Hotels	24	61	+ 3h 25' 28"	
137	Cristián Rodríguez	Spain	Arkéa–B&B Hotels	30	20	+ 1h 36' 15"	
138	Clément Venturini	France	Arkéa–B&B Hotels	31	43	+ 2h 52' 39"	
141	Enric Mas	Spain	Movistar Team	30	DNF-18	–	
142	Will Barta	United States	Movistar Team	29	102	+ 4h 20' 07"	
143	Pablo Castrillo ‡	Spain	Movistar Team	24	110	+ 4h 42' 51"	
144	Nelson Oliveira	Portugal	Movistar Team	36	74	+ 3h 41' 03"	
145	Iván García Cortina	Spain	Movistar Team	29	117	+ 4h 53' 18"	
146	Gregor Mühlberger	Austria	Movistar Team	31	18	+ 1h 28' 17"	
147	Iván Romeo ‡	Spain	Movistar Team	21	107	+ 4h 33' 49"	
148	Einer Rubio	Colombia	Movistar Team	27	31	+ 2h 21' 56"	
151	Felix Gall	Austria	Decathlon–AG2R La Mondiale	27	5	+ 17' 12"	
152	Bruno Armirail	France	Decathlon–AG2R La Mondiale	31	50	+ 3h 03' 12"	
153	Clément Berthet	France	Decathlon–AG2R La Mondiale	27	36	+ 2h 32' 50"	
154	Stefan Bissegger	Switzerland	Decathlon–AG2R La Mondiale	26	DNF-1	–	
155	Oliver Naesen	Belgium	Decathlon–AG2R La Mondiale	34	73	+ 3h 39' 28"	
156	Aurélien Paret-Peintre	France	Decathlon–AG2R La Mondiale	29	25	+ 2h 22' 52"	
157	Callum Scotson	Australia	Decathlon–AG2R La Mondiale	28	33	+ 2h 25' 40"	
158	Bastien Tronchon ‡	France	Decathlon–AG2R La Mondiale	23	77	+ 3h 46' 36"	
161	Emanuel Buchmann	Germany	Cofidis	32	30	+ 2h 21' 34"	
162	Alex Aranburu	Spain	Cofidis	29	81	+ 3h 49' 29"	
163	Bryan Coquard	France	Cofidis	33	DNS-14	–	
164	Ion Izagirre	Spain	Cofidis	36	69	+ 3h 35' 02"	
165	Alexis Renard	France	Cofidis	26	145	+ 5h 34' 56"	
166	Dylan Teuns	Belgium	Cofidis	33	90	+ 3h 55' 48"	
167	Benjamin Thomas	France	Cofidis	29	154	+ 5h 41' 16"	
168	Damien Touzé	France	Cofidis	28	94	+ 4h 01' 48"	
171	Harold Tejada	Colombia	XDS Astana Team	28	44	+ 2h 54' 34"	
172	Davide Ballerini	Italy	XDS Astana Team	30	135	+ 5h 20' 22"	
173	Cees Bol	Netherlands	XDS Astana Team	29	DNS-12	–	
174	Clément Champoussin	France	XDS Astana Team	27	85	+ 3h 53' 27"	
175	Yevgeniy Fedorov ‡	Kazakhstan	XDS Astana Team	25	DNS-20	–	
176	Sergio Higuita	Colombia	XDS Astana Team	27	14	+ 1h 08' 19"	
177	Mike Teunissen	Netherlands	XDS Astana Team	32	80	+ 3h 49' 28"	
178	Simone Velasco	Italy	XDS Astana Team	29	38	+ 2h 41' 31"	
181	Steff Cras	Belgium	Team TotalEnergies	29	DNF-14	–	
182	Mathieu Burgaudeau	France	Team TotalEnergies	26	63	+ 3h 26' 18"	
183	Alexandre Delettre	France	Team TotalEnergies	27	55	+ 3h 12' 28"	
184	Thomas Gachignard ‡	France	Team TotalEnergies	24	60	+ 3h 23' 14"	
185	Emilien Jeannière	France	Team TotalEnergies	26	DNS-5	–	
186	Jordan Jegat	France	Team TotalEnergies	26	10	+ 32' 42"	
187	Anthony Turgis	France	Team TotalEnergies	31	106	+ 4h 31' 58"	
188	Mattéo Vercher ‡	France	Team TotalEnergies	24	124	+ 5h 06' 33"	
191	Oscar Onley ‡	Great Britain	Team Picnic–PostNL	22	4	+ 12' 12"	
192	Warren Barguil	France	Team Picnic–PostNL	33	23	+ 1h 48' 09"	
193	Pavel Bittner ‡	Czechia	Team Picnic–PostNL	22	133	+ 5h 17' 44"	
194	Sean Flynn ‡	Great Britain	Team Picnic–PostNL	25	134	+ 5h 18' 13"	
195	Tobias Lund Andresen ‡	Denmark	Team Picnic–PostNL	22	96	+ 4h 06' 51"	
196	Niklas Märkl	Germany	Team Picnic–PostNL	26	112	+ 4h 46' 23"	
197	Tim Naberman	Netherlands	Team Picnic–PostNL	26	120	+ 5h 00' 03"	
198	Frank van den Broek ‡	Netherlands	Team Picnic–PostNL	24	39	+ 2h 45' 44"	
201	Michael Woods	Canada	Israel–Premier Tech	38	52	+ 3h 06' 59"	
202	Pascal Ackermann	Germany	Israel–Premier Tech	31	125	+ 5h 09' 57"	
203	Joseph Blackmore ‡	Great Britain	Israel–Premier Tech	22	48	+ 2h 59' 04"	
204	Guillaume Boivin	Canada	Israel–Premier Tech	36	149	+ 5h 37' 44"	
205	Matis Louvel	France	Israel–Premier Tech	25	100	+ 4h 13' 01"	
206	Alexey Lutsenko	Kazakhstan	Israel–Premier Tech	32	92	+ 3h 59' 52"	
207	Krists Neilands	Latvia	Israel–Premier Tech	30	88	+ 3h 54' 25"	
208	Jake Stewart	Great Britain	Israel–Premier Tech	25	108	+ 4h 36' 37"	
211	Arnaud De Lie ‡	Belgium	Lotto	23	142	+ 5h 29' 35"	
212	Jenno Berckmoes ‡	Belgium	Lotto	24	66	+ 3h 33' 12"	
213	Jasper De Buyst	Belgium	Lotto	31	DNS-5	–	
214	Jarrad Drizners	Australia	Lotto	26	129	+ 5h 11' 17"	
215	Sébastien Grignard	Belgium	Lotto	26	144	+ 5h 33' 48"	
216	Eduardo Sepúlveda	Argentina	Lotto	34	122	+ 5h 02' 54"	
217	Lennert Van Eetvelt ‡	Belgium	Lotto	23	DNS-15	–	
218	Brent Van Moer	Belgium	Lotto	27	84	+ 3h 53' 19"	
221	Tobias Halland Johannessen	Norway	Uno-X Mobility	25	6	+ 20' 14"	
222	Jonas Abrahamsen	Norway	Uno-X Mobility	29	71	+ 3h 36' 21"	
223	Magnus Cort	Denmark	Uno-X Mobility	32	130	+ 5h 11' 51"	
224	Stian Fredheim ‡	Norway	Uno-X Mobility	22	139	+ 5h 26' 41"	
225	Markus Hoelgaard	Norway	Uno-X Mobility	30	64	+ 3h 26' 29"	
226	Anders Halland Johannessen	Norway	Uno-X Mobility	25	76	+ 3h 46' 02"	
227	Andreas Leknessund	Norway	Uno-X Mobility	26	57	+ 3h 14' 44"	
228	Søren Wærenskjold ‡	Norway	Uno-X Mobility	25	DNF-10	–	

=== By team ===
(United Arab Emirates) UAE Team Emirates XRG (UAD)
No.	Rider	Pos.
1	Tadej Pogačar (SLO)	1
2	João Almeida (POR)	DNF-9
3	Jhonatan Narváez (ECU)	13
4	Nils Politt (GER)	75
5	Pavel Sivakov (FRA)	87
6	Marc Soler (ESP)	29
7	Tim Wellens (BEL)	37
8	Adam Yates (GBR)	24
Directeur sportif: Andrej Hauptman, Simone Pedrazzini

(Netherlands) Visma–Lease a Bike (TVL)
No.	Rider	Pos.
11	Jonas Vingegaard (DEN)	2
12	Edoardo Affini (ITA)	118
13	Tiesj Benoot (BEL)	54
14	Victor Campenaerts (BEL)	28
15	Matteo Jorgenson (USA)	19
16	Sepp Kuss (USA)	17
17	Wout van Aert (BEL)	67
18	Simon Yates (GBR)	15
Directeur sportif: Frans Maassen, Grischa Niermann

(Belgium) Soudal–Quick-Step (SOQ)
No.	Rider	Pos.
21	Remco Evenepoel (BEL)	DNF-14
22	Mattia Cattaneo (ITA)	DNF-7
23	Pascal Eenkhoorn (NED)	49
24	Tim Merlier (BEL)	148
25	Valentin Paret-Peintre (FRA)	41
26	Maximilian Schachmann (GER)	68
27	Bert Van Lerberghe (BEL)	147
28	Ilan Van Wilder (BEL)	32
Directeur sportif: Tom Steels, Davide Bramati

(United States) EF Education–EasyPost (EFE)
No.	Rider	Pos.
31	Ben Healy (IRL)	9
32	Vincenzo Albanese (ITA)	114
33	Kasper Asgreen (DEN)	91
34	Alex Baudin (FRA)	46
35	Neilson Powless (USA)	47
36	Harry Sweeny (AUS)	35
37	Michael Valgren (DEN)	72
38	Marijn van den Berg (NED)	DNS-10
Directeur sportif: Charly Wegelius, Tom Southam

(Belgium) Intermarché–Wanty (IWA)
No.	Rider	Pos.
41	Biniam Girmay (ERI)	132
42	Louis Barré (FRA)	82
43	Vito Braet (BEL)	143
44	Hugo Page (FRA)	138
45	Laurenz Rex (BEL)	141
46	Jonas Rutsch (GER)	128
47	Roel van Sintmaartensdijk (NED)	156
48	Georg Zimmermann (GER)	DNS-10
Directeur sportif: Aike Visbeek, Pieter Vanspeybrouck

Team Bahrain Victorious (TBV)
No.	Rider	Pos.
51	Santiago Buitrago (COL)	40
52	Phil Bauhaus (GER)	151
53	Kamil Gradek (POL)	155
54	Jack Haig (AUS)	DNF-7
55	Lenny Martinez (FRA)	79
56	Matej Mohorič (SLO)	126
57	Robert Stannard (AUS)	123
58	Fred Wright (GBR)	104
Directeur sportif: Roman Kreuziger, Xavier Florencio

(United Kingdom) INEOS Grenadiers (IGD)
No.	Rider	Pos.
61	Geraint Thomas (GBR)	58
62	Thymen Arensman (NED)	12
63	Tobias Foss (NOR)	70
64	Filippo Ganna (ITA)	DNF-1
65	Axel Laurance (FRA)	53
66	Carlos Rodríguez (ESP)	DNS-18
67	Connor Swift (GBR)	109
68	Samuel Watson (GBR)	115
Directeur sportif: Kurt Asle Arvesen, Zak Dempster

(Germany) Red Bull–Bora–Hansgrohe (RBH)
No.	Rider	Pos.
71	Primož Roglič (SLO)	8
72	Florian Lipowitz (GER)	3
73	Jordi Meeus (BEL)	158
74	Gianni Moscon (ITA)	105
75	Laurence Pithie (NZL)	89
76	Mick van Dijke (NED)	113
77	Danny van Poppel (NED)	DNS-17
78	Aleksandr Vlasov	27
Directeur sportif: Bernhard Eisel, Roger Hammond

(United States) Lidl–Trek (LTK)
No.	Rider	Pos.
81	Jonathan Milan (ITA)	146
82	Simone Consonni (ITA)	160
83	Thibau Nys (BEL)	116
84	Quinn Simmons (USA)	59
85	Mattias Skjelmose (DEN)	DNF-14
86	Toms Skujiņš (LAT)	95
87	Jasper Stuyven (BEL)	62
88	Edward Theuns (BEL)	159
Directeur sportif: Steven de Jongh, Kim Andersen

(France) Groupama–FDJ (GFC)
No.	Rider	Pos.
91	Guillaume Martin (FRA)	16
92	Lewis Askey (GBR)	127
93	Cyril Barthe (FRA)	DNS-18
94	Romain Grégoire (FRA)	34
95	Valentin Madouas (FRA)	21
96	Quentin Pacher (FRA)	45
97	Paul Penhoët (FRA)	111
98	Clément Russo (FRA)	93
Directeur sportif: Benoît Vaugrenard, Thierry Bricaud

(Belgium) Alpecin–Deceuninck (ADC)
No.	Rider	Pos.
101	Jasper Philipsen (BEL)	DNF-3
102	Silvan Dillier (SUI)	131
103	Kaden Groves (AUS)	86
104	Xandro Meurisse (BEL)	22
105	Jonas Rickaert (BEL)	98
106	Mathieu van der Poel (NED)	DNS-16
107	Gianni Vermeersch (BEL)	103
108	Emiel Verstrynge (BEL)	65
Directeur sportif: Christoph Roodhooft, Gianni Meersman

(Switzerland) Tudor Pro Cycling Team (TUD)
No.	Rider	Pos.
111	Julian Alaphilippe (FRA)	56
112	Alberto Dainese (ITA)	119
113	Marco Haller (AUT)	97
114	Marc Hirschi (SUI)	78
115	Fabian Lienhard (SUI)	157
116	Marius Mayrhofer (GER)	83
117	Michael Storer (AUS)	42
118	Matteo Trentin (ITA)	99
Directeur sportif: Matteo Tosatto, Bart Leysen

(Australia) Team Jayco–AlUla (JAY)
No.	Rider	Pos.
121	Ben O'Connor (AUS)	11
122	Eddie Dunbar (IRL)	DNF-8
123	Luke Durbridge (AUS)	137
124	Dylan Groenewegen (NED)	150
125	Luka Mezgec (SLO)	152
126	Luke Plapp (AUS)	121
127	Elmar Reinders (NED)	140
128	Mauro Schmid (SUI)	101
Directeur sportif: David McPartland, Mathew Hayman

(France) Arkéa–B&B Hotels (ARK)
No.	Rider	Pos.
131	Kévin Vauquelin (FRA)	7
132	Amaury Capiot (BEL)	136
133	Ewen Costiou (FRA)	51
134	Arnaud Démare (FRA)	153
135	Raúl García Pierna (ESP)	26
136	Mathis Le Berre (FRA)	61
137	Cristián Rodríguez (ESP)	20
138	Clément Venturini (FRA)	43
Directeur sportif: Yvon Ledanois, Didier Rous

(Spain) Movistar Team (MOV)
No.	Rider	Pos.
141	Enric Mas (ESP)	DNF-18
142	Will Barta (USA)	102
143	Pablo Castrillo (ESP)	110
144	Nelson Oliveira (POR)	74
145	Iván García Cortina (ESP)	117
146	Gregor Mühlberger (AUT)	18
147	Iván Romeo (ESP)	107
148	Einer Rubio (COL)	31
Directeur sportif: Pablo Lastras, José Vicente García

(France) Decathlon–AG2R La Mondiale (DAT)
No.	Rider	Pos.
151	Felix Gall (AUT)	5
152	Bruno Armirail (FRA)	50
153	Clément Berthet (FRA)	36
154	Stefan Bissegger (SUI)	DNF-1
155	Oliver Naesen (BEL)	73
156	Aurélien Paret-Peintre (FRA)	25
157	Callum Scotson (AUS)	33
158	Bastien Tronchon (FRA)	77
Directeur sportif: Sébastien Joly, Nicolas Guille

(France) Cofidis (COF)
No.	Rider	Pos.
161	Emanuel Buchmann (GER)	30
162	Alex Aranburu (ESP)	81
163	Bryan Coquard (FRA)	DNS-14
164	Ion Izagirre (ESP)	69
165	Alexis Renard (FRA)	145
166	Dylan Teuns (BEL)	90
167	Benjamin Thomas (FRA)	154
168	Damien Touzé (FRA)	94
Directeur sportif: Gorka Gerrikagoitia, Thierry Marichal

(Kazakhstan) XDS Astana Team (XAT)
No.	Rider	Pos.
171	Harold Tejada (COL)	44
172	Davide Ballerini (ITA)	135
173	Cees Bol (NED)	DNS-12
174	Clément Champoussin (FRA)	85
175	Yevgeniy Fedorov (KAZ)	DNS-20
176	Sergio Higuita (COL)	14
177	Mike Teunissen (NED)	80
178	Simone Velasco (ITA)	38
Directeur sportif: Mark Renshaw, Dmitry Fofonov

(France) Team TotalEnergies (TEN)
No.	Rider	Pos.
181	Steff Cras (BEL)	DNF-14
182	Mathieu Burgaudeau (FRA)	63
183	Alexandre Delettre (FRA)	55
184	Thomas Gachignard (FRA)	60
185	Emilien Jeannière (FRA)	DNS-5
186	Jordan Jegat (FRA)	10
187	Anthony Turgis (FRA)	106
188	Mattéo Vercher (FRA)	124
Directeur sportif: Lylian Lebreton, Thibaut Macé

(Netherlands) Team Picnic–PostNL (TPP)
No.	Rider	Pos.
191	Oscar Onley (GBR)	4
192	Warren Barguil (FRA)	23
193	Pavel Bittner (CZE)	133
194	Sean Flynn (GBR)	134
195	Tobias Lund Andresen (DEN)	96
196	Niklas Märkl (GER)	112
197	Tim Naberman (NED)	120
198	Frank van den Broek (NED)	39
Directeur sportif: Matthew Winston, Christian Guiberteau

Israel–Premier Tech (IPT)
No.	Rider	Pos.
201	Michael Woods (CAN)	52
202	Pascal Ackermann (GER)	125
203	Joseph Blackmore (GBR)	48
204	Guillaume Boivin (CAN)	149
205	Matis Louvel (FRA)	100
206	Alexey Lutsenko (KAZ)	92
207	Krists Neilands (LAT)	88
208	Jake Stewart (GBR)	108
Directeur sportif: Steve Bauer, Dror Pekatz

(Belgium) Lotto (LOT)
No.	Rider	Pos.
211	Arnaud De Lie (BEL)	142
212	Jenno Berckmoes (BEL)	66
213	Jasper De Buyst (BEL)	DNS-5
214	Jarrad Drizners (AUS)	129
215	Sébastien Grignard (BEL)	144
216	Eduardo Sepúlveda (ARG)	122
217	Lennert Van Eetvelt (BEL)	DNS-15
218	Brent Van Moer (BEL)	84
Directeur sportif: Tony Gallopin, Marc Wauters

(Norway) Uno-X Mobility (UXM)
No.	Rider	Pos.
221	Tobias Halland Johannessen (NOR)	6
222	Jonas Abrahamsen (NOR)	71
223	Magnus Cort (DEN)	130
224	Stian Fredheim (NOR)	139
225	Markus Hoelgaard (NOR)	64
226	Anders Halland Johannessen (NOR)	76
227	Andreas Leknessund (NOR)	57
228	Søren Wærenskjold (NOR)	DNF-10
Directeur sportif: Gabriel Rasch, Stig Kristiansen

=== By nationality ===
Country	No. of riders	Finished	Stage wins
Argentina	1	1	
Australia	10	9	2 (Kaden Groves, Ben O'Connor)
Austria	3	3	
Belgium	29	24	6 (Remco Evenepoel, Tim Merlier x2, Jasper Philipsen, Wout van Aert, Tim Wellens)
Canada	2	2	
Colombia	4	4	
Czechia	1	1	
Denmark	6	5	
Ecuador	1	1	
Eritrea	1	1	
France	38	35	1 (Valentin Paret-Peintre)
Germany	10	9	
Great Britain	11	11	1 (Simon Yates)
Ireland	2	1	1 (Ben Healy)
Italy	11	9	2 (Jonathan Milan x2)
Kazakhstan	2	1	
Latvia	2	2	
Netherlands	13	9	3 (Thymen Arensman x2, Mathieu van der Poel)
New Zealand	1	1	
Norway	8	7	1 (Jonas Abrahamsen)
Poland	1	1	
Portugal	2	1	
Slovenia	4	4	4 (Tadej Pogačar x4)
Spain	10	8	
Switzerland	5	4	
United States	5	5	
	1	1	
Total	184	160	21
