= 2025 Tour de France, Stage 1 to Stage 11 =

Cycling results

The 2025 Tour de France was the 112th edition of the Tour de France. It started in Lille on 5 July, and finished with the final stage at Champs-Élysées, Paris, on 27 July.

== Classification standings ==
Legend
| Denotes the leader of the general classification | Denotes the leader of the mountains classification |
| Denotes the leader of the points classification | Denotes the leader of the young rider classification |
| Denotes the leader of the team classification | Denotes the winner of the combativity award |

== Stage 1 ==
5 July 2025 – Lille to Lille, 184.9 km (114.9 mi)

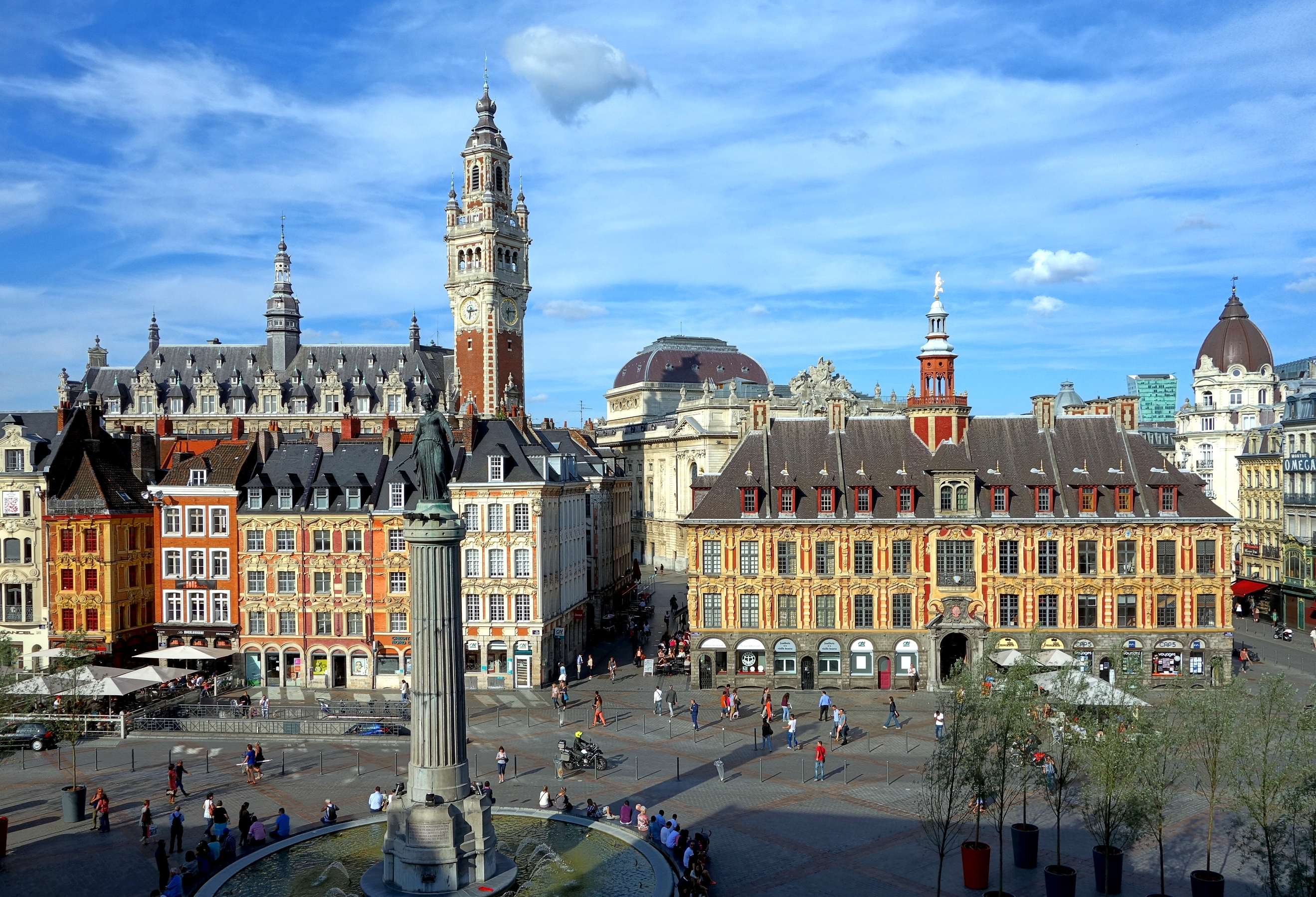
Stage 1 of the Tour started and finished in Lille

The race began with a flat stage around Lille (the Grand Départ location for the 2025 Tour), offering the sprinters an opportunity to take the first yellow jersey. There were three fourth-category climbs scattered on the route which decided the first wearer of the polka dot jersey as leader of the mountains classification. Due to the high wind speeds, there was a risk of the peloton splitting into echelons.

As the flag dropped to mark the official start of the race, five riders immediately broke away from the peloton. The break included Jonas Rutsch (Intermarché–Wanty), Bruno Armirail (Decathlon–AG2R La Mondiale), Mathis Le Berre (Arkéa–B&B Hotels), Benjamin Thomas (Cofidis), and Mattéo Vercher (Team TotalEnergies). Alpecin–Deceuninck then went to the front to keep the break's lead at around two and a half minutes. As the race approached the intermediate sprint with 97.4 kilometres (60.5 mi) left, the pace in the peloton picked up, catching the break ahead of the intermediate sprint, where Jonathan Milan (Lidl–Trek) took maximum points. Afterwards, two members of the original breakaway, Thomas and Vercher, attacked to form another break. Thomas took maximum points at the first two fourth-category climbs to become the first holder of the polka dot jersey. As he took the point at the second climb of the day, Thomas crashed and took Vercher down with him. Both riders were soon caught by the peloton following the crash.

With 17 kilometres (11 mi) to go, Visma–Lease a Bike hit the front on a crosswind section, successfully splitting the peloton. 40 riders made the front split, including Tadej Pogačar (UAE Team Emirates XRG) and Jonas Vingegaard (Visma–Lease a Bike), who were the most notable general classification (GC) contenders who made the front split while Jasper Philipsen (Alpecin–Deceuninck) and Biniam Girmay (Intermarché–Wanty) were the most notable sprinters in the front group. Despite the best efforts of the chasing peloton, the front group gradually extended their lead over the chasers to the finish. Inside the last 5 kilometres (3.1 mi), Ben O'Connor (Team Jayco–AlUla) and Marijn van den Berg (EF Education–EasyPost) crashed in the front group but they were credited with the same time due to the five kilometre rule. In the final sprint, with three of their leadout riders also making the front split, Alpecin–Deceuninck delivered a perfect leadout for Philipsen, who won the stage comfortably ahead of Girmay to take the first yellow jersey. The chasing peloton, which included Remco Evenepoel (Soudal–Quick-Step) and Primož Roglič (Red Bull–Bora–Hansgrohe), lost 39 seconds to the front group.

Two contenders for the stage 5 time trial, Filippo Ganna (Ineos Grenadiers) and Stefan Bissegger (Decathlon–AG2R La Mondiale), crashed at separate times during the stage. They both suffered concussions and had to withdraw from the race.

Stage 1 Result
| Rank | Rider | Team | Time |
|---|---|---|---|
| 1 | Jasper Philipsen (BEL) | Alpecin–Deceuninck | 3h 53' 01" |
| 2 | Biniam Girmay (ERI) | Intermarché–Wanty | + 0" |
| 3 | Søren Wærenskjold (NOR) | Uno-X Mobility | + 0" |
| 4 | Anthony Turgis (FRA) | Team TotalEnergies | + 0" |
| 5 | Matteo Trentin (ITA) | Tudor Pro Cycling Team | + 0" |
| 6 | Clément Russo (FRA) | Groupama–FDJ | + 0" |
| 7 | Paul Penhoët (FRA) | Groupama–FDJ | + 0" |
| 8 | Matteo Jorgenson (USA) | Visma–Lease a Bike | + 0" |
| 9 | Marius Mayrhofer (GER) | Tudor Pro Cycling Team | + 0" |
| 10 | Samuel Watson (GBR) | Ineos Grenadiers | + 0" |

General classification after Stage 1
| Rank | Rider | Team | Time |
|---|---|---|---|
| 1 | Jasper Philipsen (BEL) | Alpecin–Deceuninck | 3h 53' 01" |
| 2 | Biniam Girmay (ERI) | Intermarché–Wanty | + 4" |
| 3 | Søren Wærenskjold (NOR) | Uno-X Mobility | + 6" |
| 4 | Anthony Turgis (FRA) | Team TotalEnergies | + 10" |
| 5 | Matteo Trentin (ITA) | Tudor Pro Cycling Team | + 10" |
| 6 | Clément Russo (FRA) | Groupama–FDJ | + 10" |
| 7 | Paul Penhoët (FRA) | Groupama–FDJ | + 10" |
| 8 | Matteo Jorgenson (USA) | Visma–Lease a Bike | + 10" |
| 9 | Marius Mayrhofer (GER) | Tudor Pro Cycling Team | + 10" |
| 10 | Samuel Watson (GBR) | Ineos Grenadiers | + 10" |

== Stage 2 ==
6 July 2025 – Lauwin-Planque to Boulogne-sur-Mer, 209.1 km (129.9 mi)

The second stage was the longest of the race at 209.1 kilometres (129.9 mi) in length, taking the riders westwards towards the Côte d'Opale, to a finish at Boulogne-sur-Mer. The hilly stage had four categorized climbs, with three climbs occurring in the last 30 kilometres (19 mi). Inside the last 10 kilometres (6.2 mi), the riders tackled the Côte de Saint-Étienne-au-Mont (1 km at 10.6%), immediately followed by the Côte d'Outreau (800 m at 8.8%), which topped at 5.3 kilometres (3.3 mi) to go. The last 1.2 kilometres (0.75 mi) was on a 3.8% uphill drag.

The start of the stage was delayed by 15 minutes due to the weather conditions and traffic issues, which delayed some teams to the sign-on. A four-man group composed of Bruno Armirail (Decathlon–AG2R La Mondiale), Brent Van Moer (Lotto), Yevgeniy Fedorov (XDS Astana Team), and Andreas Leknessund (Uno-X Mobility) managed to break away after a few kilometres. Alpecin–Deceuninck and Intermarché–Wanty took control of the peloton, keeping the gap at around two and a half minutes. In the break, with 165 kilometres (103 mi) left, Fedorov and Leknessund crashed on slippery roads, but they were quickly able to rejoin the break. At the intermediate sprint 54 kilometres (34 mi) from the finish, after the break took the top four positions, Jonathan Milan (Lidl–Trek) took fifth ahead of Tim Merlier (Soudal–Quick-Step). Milan was visibly angry at Biniam Girmay (Intermarché–Wanty) after the sprint but he eventually apologized to Girmay after the stage. The breakaway was caught shortly after.

On the Côte du Haut Pichot with around 30 kilometres (19 mi) left, the peloton split due to a crash but the second part of the peloton quickly closed the gap. As the riders tackled the Côte de Saint-Étienne-au-Mont, Groupama–FDJ and Visma–Lease a Bike took control with Lewis Askey and Tiesj Benoot, respectively, before Matteo Jorgenson (Visma–Lease a Bike) paced the latter part of the climb. The front group was reduced to just seven riders, including the three pre-race favorites of Pogačar, Vingegaard, and Evenepoel, as well as Mathieu van der Poel (Alpecin–Deceuninck), who was the stage favorite. On the Côte d'Outreau, more riders managed to come back to the front group. Following the climb, Vingegaard launched an attack but he was unable to get a gap. There was also a counter-attack by Kévin Vauquelin (Arkéa–B&B Hotels), Alexey Lutsenko (Israel–Premier Tech), and Jorgenson but they were brought back by João Almeida (UAE Team Emirates XRG), who was setting up Pogačar for the stage. Before the final kilometre, an attack by Florian Lipowitz (Red Bull–Bora–Hansgrohe) was also brought back by Almeida, setting up a small bunch sprint for the stage win. Van der Poel led out the sprint early but he was able to hold off Pogačar to win his second Tour stage. Vingegaard took third to take the final bonus seconds available at the line. In the GC, van der Poel took the yellow jersey from his teammate, Philipsen, who lost 31 seconds. Pogačar moved up to second at four seconds down followed by Vingegaard, who was a further two seconds behind.

Stage 2 Result
| Rank | Rider | Team | Time |
|---|---|---|---|
| 1 | Mathieu van der Poel (NED) | Alpecin–Deceuninck | 4h 45' 41" |
| 2 | Tadej Pogačar (SLO) | UAE Team Emirates XRG | + 0" |
| 3 | Jonas Vingegaard (DEN) | Visma–Lease a Bike | + 0" |
| 4 | Romain Grégoire (FRA) | Groupama–FDJ | + 0" |
| 5 | Julian Alaphilippe (FRA) | Tudor Pro Cycling Team | + 0" |
| 6 | Oscar Onley (GBR) | Team Picnic–PostNL | + 0" |
| 7 | Aurélien Paret-Peintre (FRA) | Decathlon–AG2R La Mondiale | + 0" |
| 8 | Kévin Vauquelin (FRA) | Arkéa–B&B Hotels | + 0" |
| 9 | Simone Velasco (ITA) | XDS Astana Team | + 0" |
| 10 | Jenno Berckmoes (BEL) | Lotto | + 0" |

General classification after Stage 2
| Rank | Rider | Team | Time |
|---|---|---|---|
| 1 | Mathieu van der Poel (NED) | Alpecin–Deceuninck | 8h 38' 42" |
| 2 | Tadej Pogačar (SLO) | UAE Team Emirates XRG | + 4" |
| 3 | Jonas Vingegaard (DEN) | Visma–Lease a Bike | + 6" |
| 4 | Kévin Vauquelin (FRA) | Arkéa–B&B Hotels | + 10" |
| 5 | Matteo Jorgenson (USA) | Visma–Lease a Bike | + 10" |
| 6 | Enric Mas (ESP) | Movistar Team | + 10" |
| 7 | Jasper Philipsen (BEL) | Alpecin–Deceuninck | + 31" |
| 8 | Joseph Blackmore (GBR) | Israel–Premier Tech | + 41" |
| 9 | Tobias Halland Johannessen (NOR) | Uno-X Mobility | + 41" |
| 10 | Ben O'Connor (AUS) | Team Jayco–AlUla | + 41" |

== Stage 3 ==
7 July 2025 – Valenciennes to Dunkirk, 178.3 km (110.8 mi)

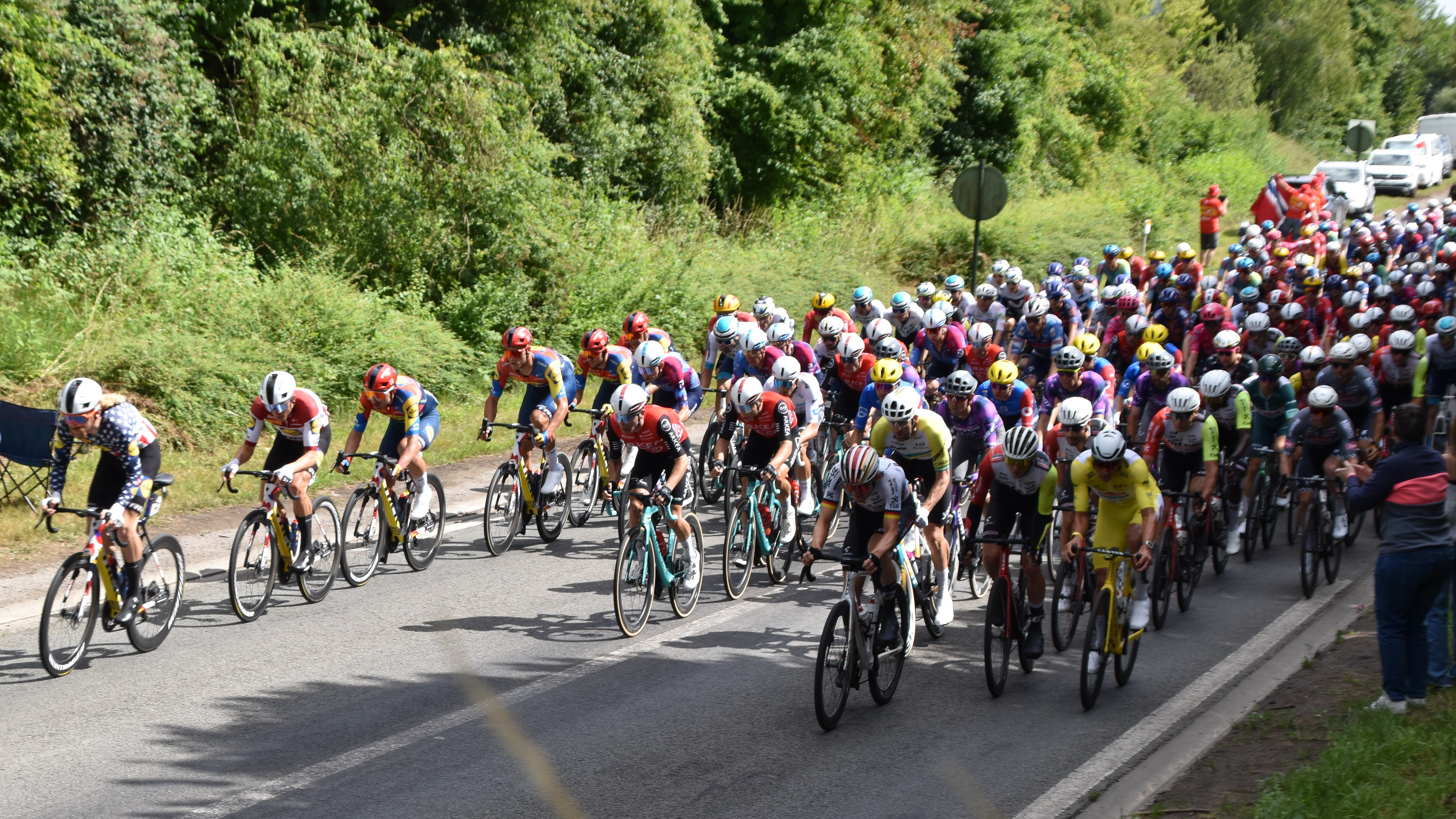
Peloton on stage 3 at Isbergues.

The third stage remained in Hauts-de-France, heading north from Valenciennes towards Dunkirk over a flat route. The only climb on the day was the fourth-category cobbled climb of Mont Cassel (2.3 km at 3.8%), which topped at around 30 kilometres (19 mi) left.

With only one late climb on the parcours, no riders were willing to go into the break. The stage was mostly uneventful until the intermediate sprint, where Jonathan Milan (Lidl–Trek) took maximum points. However, Jasper Philipsen (the leader of the points classification) went down heavily during the sprint after Bryan Coquard (Cofidis) lost control of his bike due to a touch of wheels. Philipsen was forced to abandon the race; after the stage, his team announced that he suffered a displaced fracture of the right collarbone as well as broken ribs. As the riders approached the only categorized climb of the day, Tim Wellens (UAE Team Emirates XRG) soloed off the front of the peloton to take the solitary KOM point, moving into the lead of the mountains classification ahead of his teammate, Tadej Pogačar. The final 5 kilometres (3.1 mi) was marred by several crashes, the first of which involved notable riders such as Evenepoel and sprinter Jordi Meeus (Red Bull–Bora–Hansgrohe); all riders involved managed to finish the stage but some riders such as Meeus suffered abrasions.

In the run up to the finish line, Danny van Poppel (Red Bull–Bora–Hansgrohe) was relegated for a dangerous move that caused the crash of several riders such as Davide Ballerini (XDS Astana Team) and Emilien Jeannière (Team TotalEnergies). The final sprint was won by Tim Merlier (Soudal–Quick-Step) in a photo finish with Milan. All 181 finishers were credited with the same time, resulting in only minor changes in the general classification. Milan took the green jersey of the points classification. No rider was awarded the combativity award, with media noting that "nothing noteworthy occurred during 99% of the [stage]".

Stage 3 Result
| Rank | Rider | Team | Time |
|---|---|---|---|
| 1 | Tim Merlier (BEL) | Soudal–Quick-Step | 4h 16' 55" |
| 2 | Jonathan Milan (ITA) | Lidl–Trek | + 0" |
| 3 | Phil Bauhaus (GER) | Team Bahrain Victorious | + 0" |
| 4 | Søren Wærenskjold (NOR) | Uno-X Mobility | + 0" |
| 5 | Pavel Bittner (CZE) | Team Picnic–PostNL | + 0" |
| 6 | Biniam Girmay (ERI) | Intermarché–Wanty | + 0" |
| 7 | Kaden Groves (AUS) | Alpecin–Deceuninck | + 0" |
| 8 | Pascal Ackermann (GER) | Israel–Premier Tech | + 0" |
| 9 | Amaury Capiot (BEL) | Arkéa–B&B Hotels | + 0" |
| 10 | Alberto Dainese (ITA) | Tudor Pro Cycling Team | + 0" |

General classification after Stage 3
| Rank | Rider | Team | Time |
|---|---|---|---|
| 1 | Mathieu van der Poel (NED) | Alpecin–Deceuninck | 12h 55' 37" |
| 2 | Tadej Pogačar (SLO) | UAE Team Emirates XRG | + 4" |
| 3 | Jonas Vingegaard (DEN) | Visma–Lease a Bike | + 6" |
| 4 | Kévin Vauquelin (FRA) | Arkéa–B&B Hotels | + 10" |
| 5 | Matteo Jorgenson (USA) | Visma–Lease a Bike | + 10" |
| 6 | Enric Mas (ESP) | Movistar Team | + 10" |
| 7 | Joseph Blackmore (GBR) | Israel–Premier Tech | + 41" |
| 8 | Tobias Halland Johannessen (NOR) | Uno-X Mobility | + 41" |
| 9 | Ben O'Connor (AUS) | Team Jayco–AlUla | + 41" |
| 10 | Emanuel Buchmann (GER) | Cofidis | + 49" |

== Stage 4 ==
8 July 2025 – Amiens to Rouen, 174.2 km (108.2 mi)

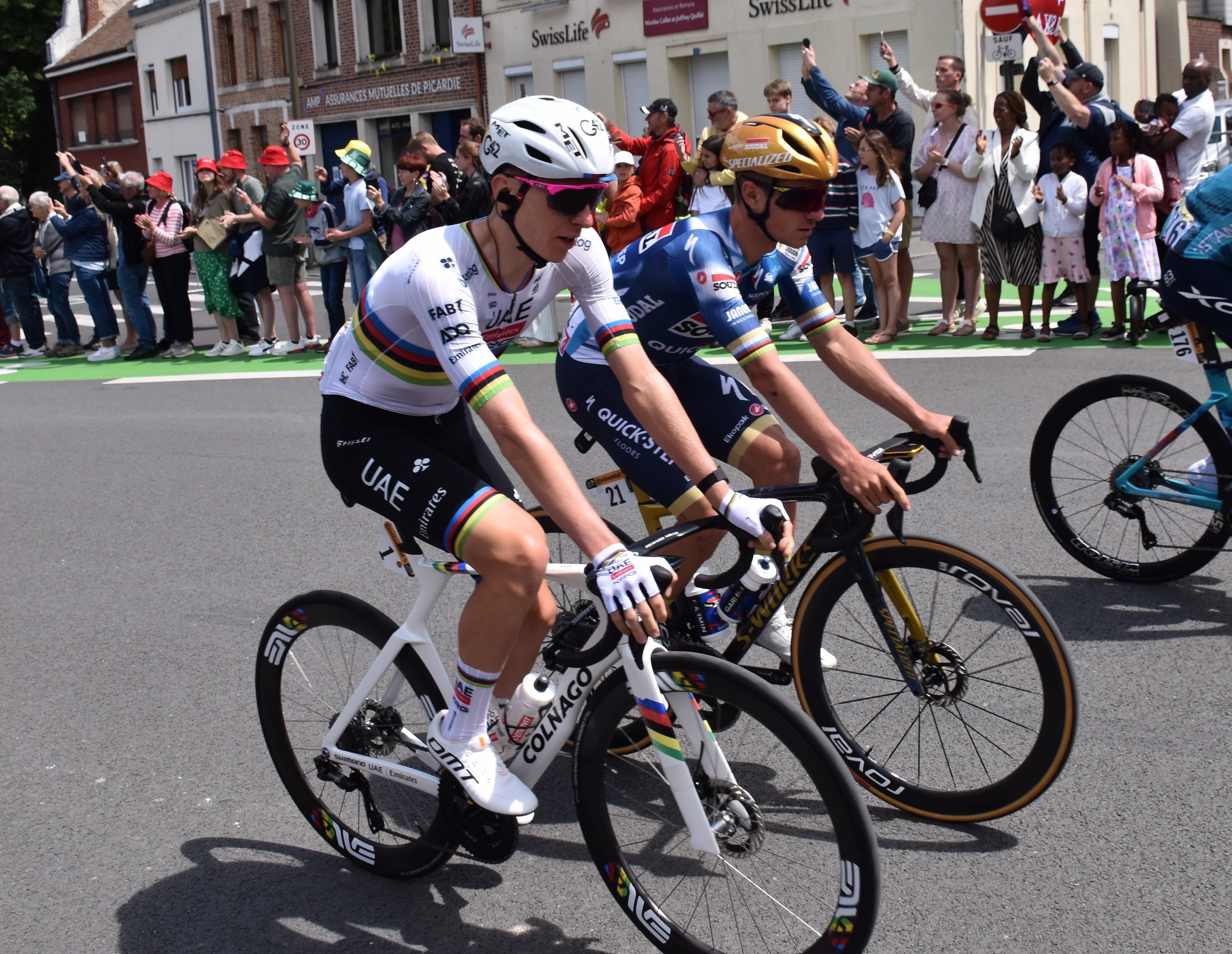
Winner of stage 4 Tadej Pogačar (left) riding alongside Remco Evenepoel (right) in Amiens.

The fourth stage started in Amiens, before heading across the plains of Picardy towards Rouen in Normandy. Considered a hilly stage, the stage had five categorized climbs, all of which took place in the last 50 kilometres (31 mi) of the stage. The third-category climb of Rampe Saint-Hilaire (800m at 10.6%) was located just 5 kilometres (3.1 mi) from the finish in Rouen.

Three riders, Lenny Martinez (Team Bahrain Victorious), Thomas Gachignard (Team TotalEnergies), and Jonas Abrahamsen (Uno-X Mobility) immediately broke away before eventually being joined by Kasper Asgreen (EF Education–EasyPost). The break's gap stabilized at around two minutes with Alpecin–Deceuninck controlling the gap for the yellow jersey, Mathieu van der Poel. As the race approached the categorized climbs in the last 50 kilometres (31 mi), the pace in the peloton picked up. There were a few crashes in the peloton but no riders were seriously injured. The break fragmented over the series of short climbs until Martinez was left alone at the front. He would eventually be caught with 20.8 kilometres (12.9 mi) to go as UAE Team Emirates XRG started to keep the pace high at the front of the peloton as they entered the city of Rouen.

Just as the riders went over the top of the Côte de la Grand’Mare, the penultimate climb of the day, Visma–Lease a Bike took control of the race, leading the peloton to the foot of the final climb, Rampe Saint-Hilaire. Jhonatan Narváez and João Almeida (UAE Team Emirates XRG) soon began their leadout before Tadej Pogačar launched his attack. Jonas Vingegaard (Visma–Lease a Bike) immediately responded to the attack and although he was briefly dropped, Vingegaard made it back to Pogačar's wheel at the top of the climb. A group containing Remco Evenepoel (Soudal–Quick-Step), Oscar Onley (Team Picnic–PostNL), Matteo Jorgenson (Visma–Lease a Bike), van der Poel, and Almeida caught the pair on the descent, with Romain Grégoire (Groupama–FDJ) also catching up a few minutes later. Jorgenson and Evenepoel launched counter-attacks but they were closed down by Almeida, who soon began his leadout inside the final kilometre. Van der Poel launched his sprint first, but unlike in stage 2, Pogačar was able to come around him to win the stage, taking his 100th career victory in the process. Van der Poel narrowly beat Vingegaard for second while Evenepoel and Jorgenson lost a few seconds on the line. A group containing Primož Roglič (Red Bull–Bora–Hansgrohe) finished around half a minute down. In the GC, despite being on the same time as Pogačar, van der Poel kept the yellow jersey by virtue of a smaller sum of stage positions across the four stages. Vingegaard retained third, at eight seconds down, ahead of the crucial 33-kilometre (21 mi) individual time trial on stage 5.

Stage 4 Result
| Rank | Rider | Team | Time |
|---|---|---|---|
| 1 | Tadej Pogačar (SLO) | UAE Team Emirates XRG | 3h 50' 29" |
| 2 | Mathieu van der Poel (NED) | Alpecin–Deceuninck | + 0" |
| 3 | Jonas Vingegaard (DEN) | Visma–Lease a Bike | + 0" |
| 4 | Oscar Onley (GBR) | Team Picnic–PostNL | + 0" |
| 5 | Romain Grégoire (FRA) | Groupama–FDJ | + 0" |
| 6 | João Almeida (POR) | UAE Team Emirates XRG | + 0" |
| 7 | Remco Evenepoel (BEL) | Soudal–Quick-Step | + 3" |
| 8 | Matteo Jorgenson (USA) | Visma–Lease a Bike | + 3" |
| 9 | Mattias Skjelmose (DEN) | Lidl–Trek | + 7" |
| 10 | Kévin Vauquelin (FRA) | Arkéa–B&B Hotels | + 10" |

General classification after Stage 4
| Rank | Rider | Team | Time |
|---|---|---|---|
| 1 | Mathieu van der Poel (NED) | Alpecin–Deceuninck | 16h 46' 00" |
| 2 | Tadej Pogačar (SLO) | UAE Team Emirates XRG | + 0" |
| 3 | Jonas Vingegaard (DEN) | Visma–Lease a Bike | + 8" |
| 4 | Matteo Jorgenson (USA) | Visma–Lease a Bike | + 19" |
| 5 | Kévin Vauquelin (FRA) | Arkéa–B&B Hotels | + 26" |
| 6 | Enric Mas (ESP) | Movistar Team | + 48" |
| 7 | Oscar Onley (GBR) | Team Picnic–PostNL | + 55" |
| 8 | João Almeida (POR) | UAE Team Emirates XRG | + 55" |
| 9 | Remco Evenepoel (BEL) | Soudal–Quick-Step | + 58" |
| 10 | Mattias Skjelmose (DEN) | Lidl–Trek | + 1' 02" |

== Stage 5 ==
9 July 2025 – Caen to Caen, 33 km (21 mi)

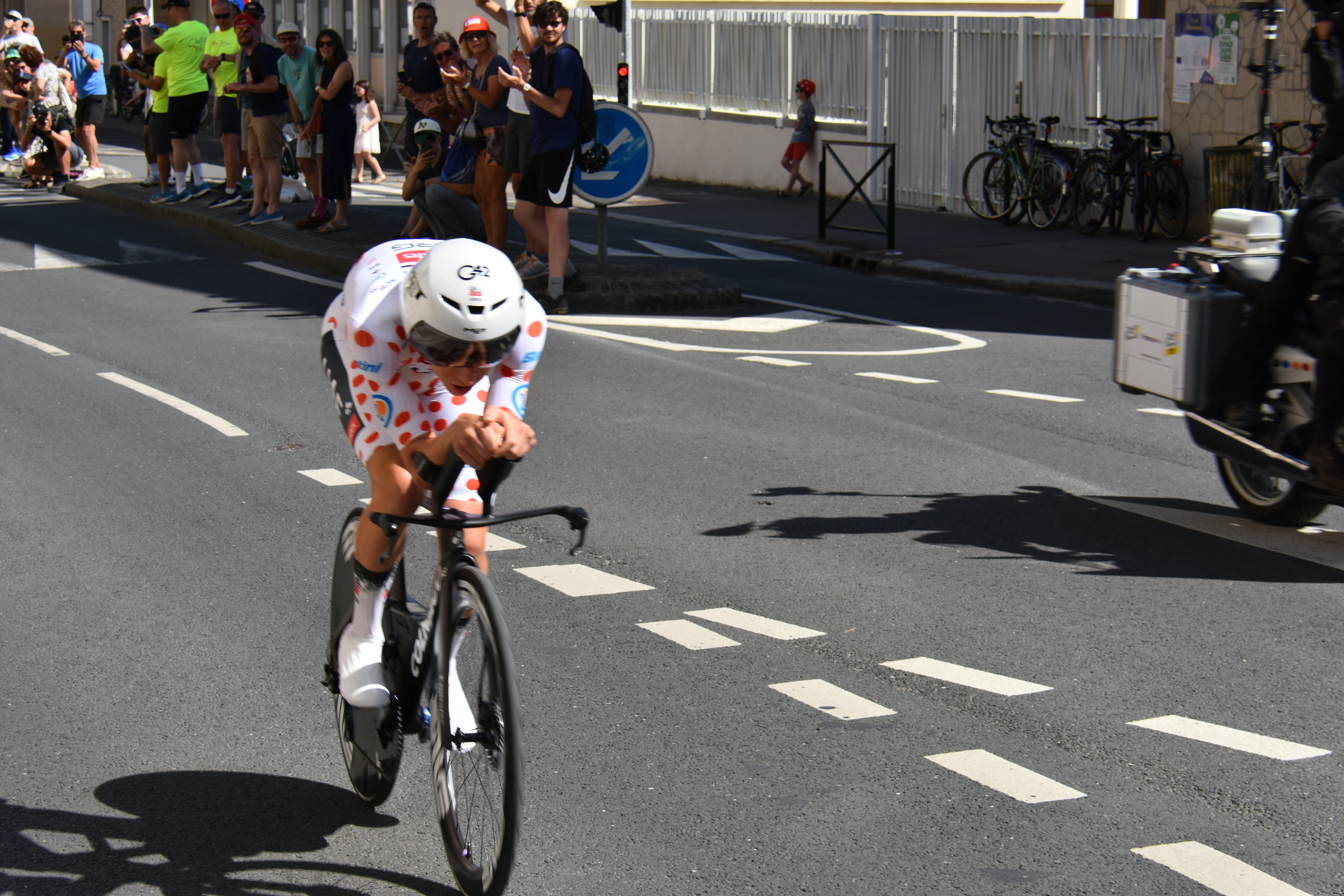
Tadej Pogačar riding the time trial in the polka-dot jersey of the Mountains classification.

The first of two individual time trials on the 2025 Tour took place in Caen in Normandy, over a 33-kilometre (21 mi) route on wide, flat roads. There were three intermediate time checks on the course, located after 8.2 kilometres (5.1 mi), 16.4 kilometres (10.2 mi), and 24.8 kilometres (15.4 mi). Prior to the stage Emilien Jeannière withdrew from the tour; it transpired that he had completed stage 4 with a broken shoulder blade after a crash in stage 3. Jasper De Buyst also withdrew due to illness.

The earliest benchmark time was set by Pablo Castrillo (Movistar Team), who finished with a time of exactly 38 minutes, which was good enough for tenth on the day. His time was quickly bettered by his teammate, Iván Romeo, who finished 16 seconds better than Castrillo. Luke Plapp (Team Jayco–AlUla) seemed to threaten Romeo's time when he set the overall fastest time at the first two time checks but he eventually set a time of 37' 59", 15 seconds slower than Romeo. Eventually, a rider who sat in the hot seat for much of the day was Edoardo Affini (Visma–Lease a Bike), the current European time trial champion. Although he was not the fastest rider at the first two time checks, Affini sped up towards the end to set a time of 37' 15". Bruno Armirail (Decathlon–AG2R La Mondiale) came close to beating Affini's time but he eventually fell short by two seconds.

The focus soon shifted to the battle between the GC contenders. After losing almost a minute in stage 4, Florian Lipowitz (Red Bull–Bora–Hansgrohe) bounced back during the time trial, finishing with a time of 37' 40", which was good enough for sixth on the stage. His teammate, Primož Roglič, finished just outside the top ten with a time of 38' 01". Other notable good times amongst GC contenders came from Kévin Vauquelin (Arkéa–B&B Hotels) and João Almeida (UAE Team Emirates XRG), who finished fifth and eighth, respectively. Soon, the top three contenders for the Tour, Tadej Pogačar (UAE Team Emirates XRG), Jonas Vingegaard (Visma–Lease a Bike), and Remco Evenepoel (Soudal–Quick-Step), came down the start ramp. At the first time check, Evenepoel was a second faster than Pogačar, with Vingegaard already losing 20 seconds at the same point. Over the rest of the course, Evenepoel gradually increased his gap over Pogačar, who in turn was also extending his advantage over Vingegaard.

At the finish, Evenepoel set the fastest time of 36' 42", winning the stage by 16 seconds ahead of Pogačar, who finished second on the day. Meanwhile, Vingegaard set a time of 38' 03", finishing outside the top ten and losing more than a minute to both Evenepoel and Pogačar. The yellow jersey holder, Mathieu van der Poel (Alpecin–Deceuninck), set a time of 38' 26", conceding the yellow jersey to Pogačar, who now led by 42 seconds over Evenepoel. Vauquelin was third overall, the only other rider within a minute of Pogačar. Vingegaard now sits in fourth at 1' 13" down. Vingegaard's performance was considered sub-par, but he expressed optimism that he could recover the lost time in later stages.

Stage 5 Result
| Rank | Rider | Team | Time |
|---|---|---|---|
| 1 | Remco Evenepoel (BEL) | Soudal–Quick-Step | 36' 42" |
| 2 | Tadej Pogačar (SLO) | UAE Team Emirates XRG | + 16" |
| 3 | Edoardo Affini (ITA) | Visma–Lease a Bike | + 33" |
| 4 | Bruno Armirail (FRA) | Decathlon–AG2R La Mondiale | + 35" |
| 5 | Kévin Vauquelin (FRA) | Arkéa–B&B Hotels | + 49" |
| 6 | Florian Lipowitz (GER) | Red Bull–Bora–Hansgrohe | + 58" |
| 7 | Iván Romeo (ESP) | Movistar Team | + 1' 02" |
| 8 | João Almeida (POR) | UAE Team Emirates XRG | + 1' 14" |
| 9 | Luke Plapp (AUS) | Team Jayco–AlUla | + 1' 17" |
| 10 | Pablo Castrillo (ESP) | Movistar Team | + 1' 18" |

General classification after Stage 5
| Rank | Rider | Team | Time |
|---|---|---|---|
| 1 | Tadej Pogačar (SLO) | UAE Team Emirates XRG | 17h 22' 58" |
| 2 | Remco Evenepoel (BEL) | Soudal–Quick-Step | + 42" |
| 3 | Kévin Vauquelin (FRA) | Arkéa–B&B Hotels | + 59" |
| 4 | Jonas Vingegaard (DEN) | Visma–Lease a Bike | + 1' 13" |
| 5 | Matteo Jorgenson (USA) | Visma–Lease a Bike | + 1' 22" |
| 6 | Mathieu van der Poel (NED) | Alpecin–Deceuninck | + 1' 28" |
| 7 | João Almeida (POR) | UAE Team Emirates XRG | + 1' 53" |
| 8 | Primož Roglič (SLO) | Red Bull–Bora–Hansgrohe | + 2' 30" |
| 9 | Florian Lipowitz (GER) | Red Bull–Bora–Hansgrohe | + 2' 31" |
| 10 | Mattias Skjelmose (DEN) | Lidl–Trek | + 2' 32" |

== Stage 6 ==
10 July 2025 – Bayeux to Vire Normandie, 201.5 km (125.2 mi)

The sixth stage remained in Normandy, starting in Bayeux. The hilly route in "Norman Switzerland" had six categorized climbs (five third-category and one fourth-category) totaling 3,550 metres (11,650 ft) in elevation. The stage finished in Vire Normandie at the top of a 700-metre (2,300 ft) long uncategorized climb with an average gradient of 10%.

As the stage started, Lidl–Trek and Intermarché–Wanty controlled the peloton until the intermediate sprint after 22 kilometres (14 mi) of racing. In the sprint, Jonathan Milan (Lidl–Trek) took maximum points ahead of Mathieu van der Poel (Alpecin–Deceuninck) and Biniam Girmay (Intermarché–Wanty). Immediately afterwards, Quinn Simmons (Lidl–Trek) and Ben Healy (EF Education–EasyPost) initiated a long fight for the break that would go on for more than an hour. Just after the riders crossed the top of Côte de la Rançonnière with 145 kilometres (90 mi) to go, Healy and Simmons were once again able to get a gap together with Will Barta (Movistar Team), Harold Tejada (XDS Astana Team), and van der Poel. The fight to join the break continued behind, with Simon Yates (Visma–Lease a Bike), Michael Storer (Tudor Pro Cycling Team), and Eddie Dunbar (Team Jayco–AlUla) successfully making the bridge to make it eight riders up front. Eventually, UAE Team Emirates XRG took control of the peloton, letting the gap go out and let the break fight for the stage win.

With 42.5 kilometres (26.4 mi) left, Healy made the first attack out of the break. He immediately got a gap and gradually extended his advantage over the chasers. 29 kilometres (18 mi) from the finish, Simmons and Storer attacked in pursuit of Healy, whose lead stood at just under a minute. Despite the chasing duo's efforts, Healy continued to extend his advantage all the way to the finish to win his first Tour stage. On the final ramp to the finish line, Simmons dropped Storer to finish second at just under three minutes down on Healy. Meanwhile, in the peloton, Visma–Lease a Bike increased the pace in the final 10 kilometres (6.2 mi). At the finish, Tadej Pogačar (UAE Team Emirates XRG) led the reduced GC group across the line at almost five and a half minutes down. With van der Poel finishing ahead of the GC group by 1' 29", he took back the yellow jersey by a solitary second over Pogačar. Healy's ride allowed him to enter the top ten on GC at just over two minutes down. Some GC contenders, like Primož Roglič (Red Bull–Bora–Hansgrohe) and João Almeida (UAE Team Emirates XRG), lost five seconds while Mattias Skjelmose (Lidl–Trek) conceded 40 seconds after suffering a puncture in the final 10 kilometres (6.2 mi).

Stage 6 Result
| Rank | Rider | Team | Time |
|---|---|---|---|
| 1 | Ben Healy (IRL) | EF Education–EasyPost | 4h 24' 10" |
| 2 | Quinn Simmons (USA) | Lidl–Trek | + 2' 44" |
| 3 | Michael Storer (AUS) | Tudor Pro Cycling Team | + 2' 51" |
| 4 | Eddie Dunbar (IRL) | Team Jayco–AlUla | + 3' 21" |
| 5 | Simon Yates (GBR) | Visma–Lease a Bike | + 3' 24" |
| 6 | Will Barta (USA) | Movistar Team | + 3' 29" |
| 7 | Harold Tejada (COL) | XDS Astana Team | + 3' 52" |
| 8 | Mathieu van der Poel (NED) | Alpecin–Deceuninck | + 3' 58" |
| 9 | Tadej Pogačar (SLO) | UAE Team Emirates XRG | + 5' 27" |
| 10 | Jonas Vingegaard (DEN) | Visma–Lease a Bike | + 5' 27" |

General classification after Stage 6
| Rank | Rider | Team | Time |
|---|---|---|---|
| 1 | Mathieu van der Poel (NED) | Alpecin–Deceuninck | 21h 52' 34" |
| 2 | Tadej Pogačar (SLO) | UAE Team Emirates XRG | + 1" |
| 3 | Remco Evenepoel (BEL) | Soudal–Quick-Step | + 43" |
| 4 | Kévin Vauquelin (FRA) | Arkéa–B&B Hotels | + 1' 00" |
| 5 | Jonas Vingegaard (DEN) | Visma–Lease a Bike | + 1' 14" |
| 6 | Matteo Jorgenson (USA) | Visma–Lease a Bike | + 1' 23" |
| 7 | João Almeida (POR) | UAE Team Emirates XRG | + 1' 59" |
| 8 | Ben Healy (IRL) | EF Education–EasyPost | + 2' 01" |
| 9 | Florian Lipowitz (GER) | Red Bull–Bora–Hansgrohe | + 2' 32" |
| 10 | Primož Roglič (SLO) | Red Bull–Bora–Hansgrohe | + 2' 36" |

== Stage 7 ==
11 July 2025 – Saint-Malo to Guerlédan (Mûr-de-Bretagne), 197 km (122 mi)

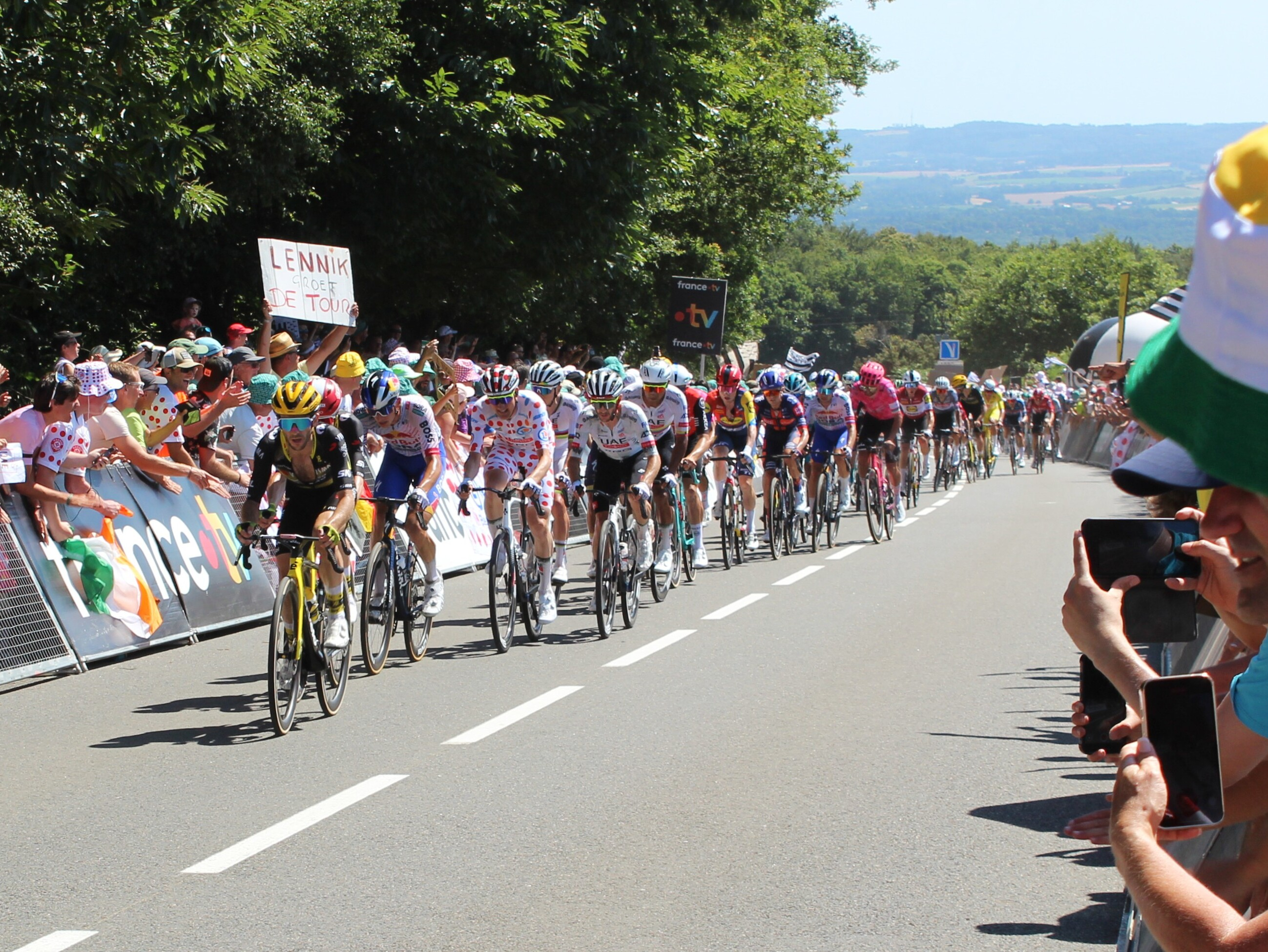
Peloton climbing the Mûr-de-Bretagne

The seventh stage took place in Brittany, starting in Saint-Malo before culminating on a finishing circuit with two ascents of the third-category climb of Mûr-de-Bretagne (2 km at 6.9%).

Much like the previous day, the race featured another long fight to get into the break. It took more than 50 kilometres (31 mi) before Geraint Thomas (Ineos Grenadiers), Alex Baudin (EF Education–EasyPost), Ewen Costiou (Arkéa–B&B Hotels), Marco Haller (Tudor Pro Cycling Team), and Iván García Cortina (Movistar Team) were able to form to the break. Their lead hovered at just under two minutes with UAE Team Emirates XRG and Alpecin–Deceuninck controlling the peloton. At the intermediate sprint with 57 kilometres (35 mi) to go, after the quintet took the maximum points, Jonathan Milan (Lidl–Trek) took the highest possible position in the peloton to briefly extend his lead in the points classification. As the race approached the first ascent of Mûr-de-Bretagne, the break's lead hovered at just around a minute.

On the first ascent of Mûr-de-Bretagne, Costiou managed to drop his breakaway companions, ensuring that he took the combativity prize at the end of the stage. Meanwhile, in the peloton, Visma–Lease a Bike upped the tempo with Simon Yates, splitting the peloton. Among those briefly dropped included the yellow jersey of Mathieu van der Poel (Alpecin–Deceuninck) but he was able to make it back to the peloton. At the top of Mûr-de-Bretagne, Wout van Aert (Visma–Lease a Bike) launched an attack but he was closed down by Tim Wellens (UAE Team Emirates XRG). Marc Soler (UAE Team Emirates XRG) soon took control of the peloton on the approach to the second time up Mûr-de-Bretagne, catching Costiou in the process. With 6.5 kilometres (4.0 mi) to go, there was a high-speed crash at the back of the reduced front group involving several riders. Among those involved was the previous day's stage winner, Ben Healy (EF Education–EasyPost), as well as Jack Haig (Team Bahrain Victorious), who had to abandon the race. However, the most notable rider involved in terms of the GC was João Almeida (UAE Team Emirates XRG), one of the potential podium contenders. He ended up losing more than 10 minutes to drop out of GC contention after suffering a rib fracture and several road rashes.

As the front group approached the second ascent of Mûr-de-Bretagne, Wellens began his leadout, lining up the peloton in one long line. On the steep portion of the climb, Tadej Pogačar (UAE Team Emirates XRG) increased the pace, with Jonas Vingegaard (Visma–Lease a Bike) and Remco Evenepoel (Soudal–Quick-Step) the only riders able to follow him. Inside the final kilometre, a group of six riders caught up with the trio to make it nine riders out front. Pogačar's teammate, Jhonatan Narvaez, immediately went to the front to start his leadout for the final sprint. Pogačar was the first rider to launch his sprint, with Vingegaard going straight to his wheel. Vingegaard was unable to come around as Pogačar won his second stage of this year's Tour. There was a two-second gap at the line between the lead duo and the rest of the group, which was led by Oscar Onley (Team Picnic–PostNL). With van der Poel losing almost a minute and a half, Pogačar retook the yellow jersey by 54 seconds ahead of Evenepoel while Vingegaard's deficit increased to 1' 17". With 50 points on offer for the stage winner, Pogačar also took the lead in the points classification.

Stage 7 Result
| Rank | Rider | Team | Time |
|---|---|---|---|
| 1 | Tadej Pogačar (SLO) | UAE Team Emirates XRG | 4h 05' 39" |
| 2 | Jonas Vingegaard (DEN) | Visma–Lease a Bike | + 0" |
| 3 | Oscar Onley (GBR) | Team Picnic–PostNL | + 2" |
| 4 | Felix Gall (AUT) | Decathlon–AG2R La Mondiale | + 2" |
| 5 | Matteo Jorgenson (USA) | Visma–Lease a Bike | + 2" |
| 6 | Remco Evenepoel (BEL) | Soudal–Quick-Step | + 2" |
| 7 | Kévin Vauquelin (FRA) | Arkéa–B&B Hotels | + 2" |
| 8 | Jhonatan Narvaez (ECU) | UAE Team Emirates XRG | + 7" |
| 9 | Axel Laurance (FRA) | Ineos Grenadiers | + 15" |
| 10 | Tobias Halland Johannessen (NOR) | Uno-X Mobility | + 21" |

General classification after Stage 7
| Rank | Rider | Team | Time |
|---|---|---|---|
| 1 | Tadej Pogačar (SLO) | UAE Team Emirates XRG | 25h 58' 04" |
| 2 | Remco Evenepoel (BEL) | Soudal–Quick-Step | + 54" |
| 3 | Kévin Vauquelin (FRA) | Arkéa–B&B Hotels | + 1' 11" |
| 4 | Jonas Vingegaard (DEN) | Visma–Lease a Bike | + 1' 17" |
| 5 | Mathieu van der Poel (NED) | Alpecin–Deceuninck | + 1' 29" |
| 6 | Matteo Jorgenson (USA) | Visma–Lease a Bike | + 1' 34" |
| 7 | Oscar Onley (GBR) | Team Picnic–PostNL | + 2' 49" |
| 8 | Florian Lipowitz (GER) | Red Bull–Bora–Hansgrohe | + 3' 02" |
| 9 | Primož Roglič (SLO) | Red Bull–Bora–Hansgrohe | + 3' 06" |
| 10 | Mattias Skjelmose (DEN) | Lidl–Trek | + 3' 43" |

== Stage 8 ==
12 July 2025 – Saint-Méen-le-Grand to Laval, 171.4 km (106.5 mi)

The eighth stage headed eastwards from Saint-Méen-le-Grand in Brittany to Laval over a 171.4 km (106.5 mi) course, with one fourth-category climb as the only challenge on the flat route – with a sprint finish expected.

Because of the parcours, no riders initially wanted to go into the break. The peloton eased themselves towards the intermediate sprint with 85.9 kilometres (53.4 mi) to go, where Jonathan Milan (Lidl–Trek) took maximum points ahead of Tim Merlier (Soudal–Quick-Step). A few minutes later, two riders from Team TotalEnergies, Mattéo Vercher and Mathieu Burgaudeau, attacked from the peloton to form the break of the day. The pair were not allowed a big gap as their lead fluctuated at just under a minute. Inside the final 20 kilometres (12 mi), both riders, who were both awarded the combativity prize, were caught by the peloton as the leadouts began. With 12.5 kilometres (7.8 mi) left, Merlier suffered an untimely mechanical. He managed to bridge back to the peloton but he was unable to get back into a position to sprint for the win. In the final sprint, Mathieu van der Poel (Alpecin–Deceuninck) delivered a perfect leadout for their sprinter, Kaden Groves, but Milan quickly came around him to win his first career Tour stage ahead of Wout van Aert (Visma–Lease a Bike). Milan regained the lead in the points classification after taking the maximum of 70 points on the stage. There were no changes in the general classification.

Milan became the first Italian rider to win a Tour de France stage since Vincenzo Nibali won stage 20 at the 2019 edition of the race – almost six years and a total of 113 stages since the last Italian win.

Stage 8 Result
| Rank | Rider | Team | Time |
|---|---|---|---|
| 1 | Jonathan Milan (ITA) | Lidl–Trek | 3h 50' 26" |
| 2 | Wout van Aert (BEL) | Visma–Lease a Bike | + 0" |
| 3 | Kaden Groves (AUS) | Alpecin–Deceuninck | + 0" |
| 4 | Pascal Ackermann (GER) | Israel–Premier Tech | + 0" |
| 5 | Arnaud De Lie (BEL) | Lotto | + 0" |
| 6 | Tobias Lund Andresen (DEN) | Team Picnic–PostNL | + 0" |
| 7 | Bryan Coquard (FRA) | Cofidis | + 0" |
| 8 | Alberto Dainese (ITA) | Tudor Pro Cycling Team | + 0" |
| 9 | Vincenzo Albanese (ITA) | EF Education–EasyPost | + 0" |
| 10 | Stian Fredheim (NOR) | Uno-X Mobility | + 0" |

General classification after Stage 8
| Rank | Rider | Team | Time |
|---|---|---|---|
| 1 | Tadej Pogačar (SLO) | UAE Team Emirates XRG | 29h 48' 30" |
| 2 | Remco Evenepoel (BEL) | Soudal–Quick-Step | + 54" |
| 3 | Kévin Vauquelin (FRA) | Arkéa–B&B Hotels | + 1' 11" |
| 4 | Jonas Vingegaard (DEN) | Visma–Lease a Bike | + 1' 17" |
| 5 | Mathieu van der Poel (NED) | Alpecin–Deceuninck | + 1' 29" |
| 6 | Matteo Jorgenson (USA) | Visma–Lease a Bike | + 1' 34" |
| 7 | Oscar Onley (GBR) | Team Picnic–PostNL | + 2' 49" |
| 8 | Florian Lipowitz (GER) | Red Bull–Bora–Hansgrohe | + 3' 02" |
| 9 | Primož Roglič (SLO) | Red Bull–Bora–Hansgrohe | + 3' 06" |
| 10 | Mattias Skjelmose (DEN) | Lidl–Trek | + 3' 43" |

== Stage 9 ==
13 July 2025 – Chinon to Châteauroux, 174.1 km (108.2 mi)

The ninth stage of the Tour headed south, with a flat stage from Chinon to Châteauroux in the Centre-Val de Loire region that was expected to be contested by the sprinters. There were no categorized climbs on the route but there were risks of crosswinds throughout the day.

As soon as the stage started, two riders from Alpecin–Deceuninck, Mathieu van der Poel and Jonas Rickaert, went on the attack. Their gap ballooned to as much as five and a half minutes with Lidl–Trek doing the majority of controlling in the peloton. At the intermediate sprint after 24.2 kilometres (15.0 mi) of racing, van der Poel took maximum points while Jonathan Milan (Lidl–Trek) led from the peloton to extend his lead in the points classification. During the course of the stage, João Almeida (UAE Team Emirates XRG) abandoned the race as a result of his injuries from the crash in stage 7. On the way to the finish, there were multiple attempts to form echelons but no main GC contenders were caught out. With 10 kilometres (6.2 mi) to go, the duo up front still had a lead of a minute on the peloton. Rickaert went all-out until van der Poel went solo 6 kilometres (3.7 mi) from the finish; Rickaert did get rewarded with the combativity prize. Van der Poel would eventually be caught inside the final kilometre. In the sprint, Tim Merlier (Soudal–Quick-Step) held off Milan to take his second stage of this year's Tour. Arnaud De Lie (Lotto) finished third, getting his best result in the race thus far. The top of the general classification remained unchanged.

The tailwind on the stage and the efforts to chase the Alpecin–Deceuninck breakaway meant that the stage was the second-fastest in Tour history at 50.013 km/h (31.077 mph), only the second stage to break the 50 km/h barrier.

Stage 9 Result
| Rank | Rider | Team | Time |
|---|---|---|---|
| 1 | Tim Merlier (BEL) | Soudal–Quick-Step | 3h 28' 52" |
| 2 | Jonathan Milan (ITA) | Lidl–Trek | + 0" |
| 3 | Arnaud De Lie (BEL) | Lotto | + 0" |
| 4 | Pavel Bittner (CZE) | Team Picnic–PostNL | + 0" |
| 5 | Paul Penhoët (FRA) | Groupama–FDJ | + 0" |
| 6 | Biniam Girmay (ERI) | Intermarché–Wanty | + 0" |
| 7 | Phil Bauhaus (GER) | Team Bahrain Victorious | + 0" |
| 8 | Jordi Meeus (BEL) | Red Bull–Bora–Hansgrohe | + 0" |
| 9 | Stian Fredheim (NOR) | Uno-X Mobility | + 0" |
| 10 | Kaden Groves (AUS) | Alpecin–Deceuninck | + 0" |

General classification after Stage 9
| Rank | Rider | Team | Time |
|---|---|---|---|
| 1 | Tadej Pogačar (SLO) | UAE Team Emirates XRG | 33h 17' 22" |
| 2 | Remco Evenepoel (BEL) | Soudal–Quick-Step | + 54" |
| 3 | Kévin Vauquelin (FRA) | Arkéa–B&B Hotels | + 1' 11" |
| 4 | Jonas Vingegaard (DEN) | Visma–Lease a Bike | + 1' 17" |
| 5 | Matteo Jorgenson (USA) | Visma–Lease a Bike | + 1' 34" |
| 6 | Mathieu van der Poel (NED) | Alpecin–Deceuninck | + 1' 46" |
| 7 | Oscar Onley (GBR) | Team Picnic–PostNL | + 2' 49" |
| 8 | Florian Lipowitz (GER) | Red Bull–Bora–Hansgrohe | + 3' 02" |
| 9 | Primož Roglič (SLO) | Red Bull–Bora–Hansgrohe | + 3' 06" |
| 10 | Mattias Skjelmose (DEN) | Lidl–Trek | + 3' 43" |

== Stage 10 ==
14 July 2025 – Ennezat to Mont-Dore (Puy de Sancy), 165.3 km (102.7 mi)

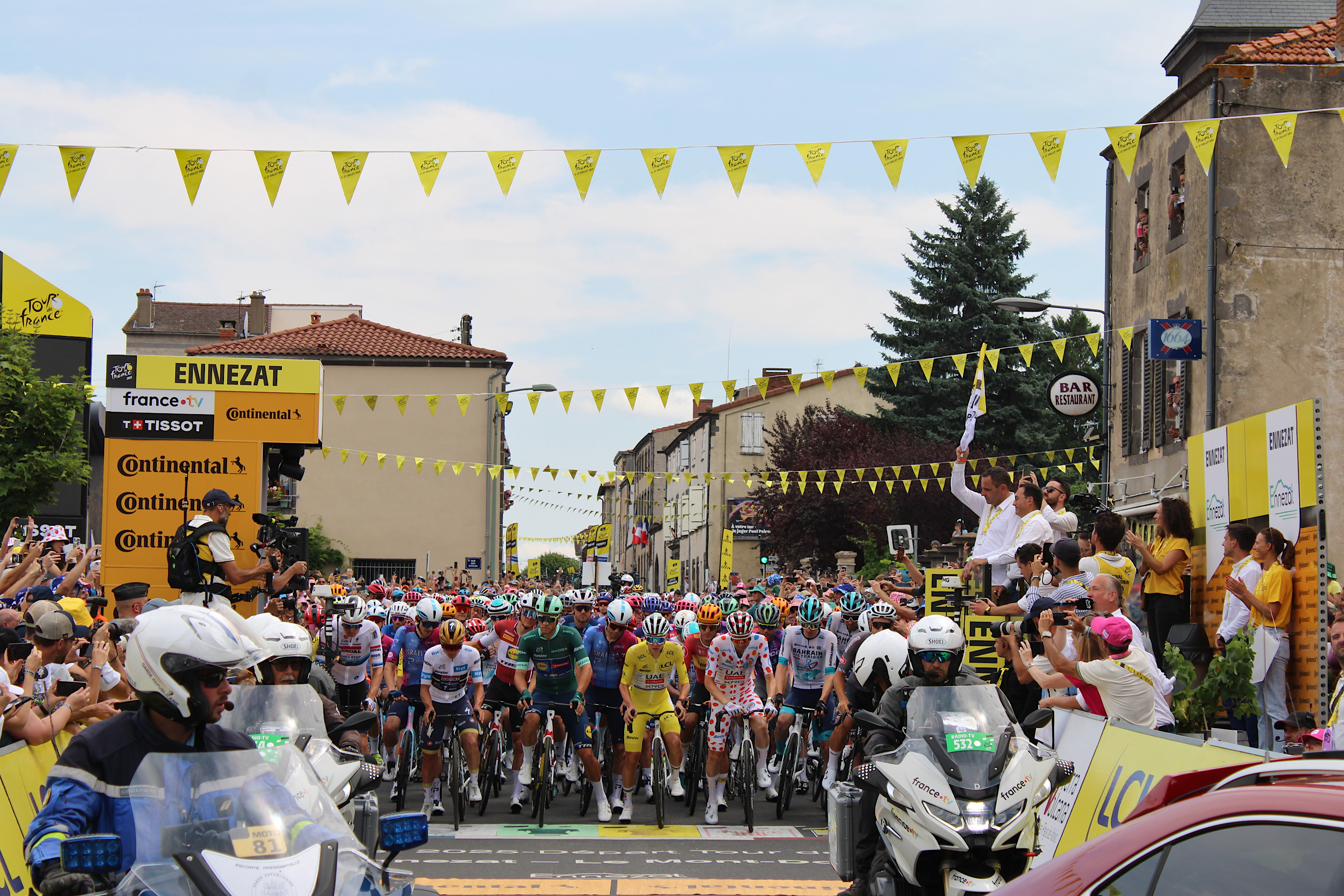
Start of the stage in Ennezat

Taking place on Bastille Day, the tenth stage from Ennezat to Mont-Dore tackled eight categorized climbs (seven second-category and one third-category) in the Massif Central mountains. The stage featured the first mountain stage of this year's Tour, with the parcours going up and down all day with almost no valley sections. It finished with the climb of Puy de Sancy, a 3.3-kilometre (2.1 mi) climb with an average of 8%.

Multiple attacks from several riders went off the front as soon as the flag dropped. Eventually, a 29-rider group went away on the first climb of the day. The best-placed rider in the GC from the break was Ben Healy (EF Education–EasyPost), who was 3’ 51” behind Tadej Pogačar (UAE Team Emirates XRG) at the start of the day. Initially, UAE Team Emirates XRG kept the break close before eventually letting the gap go out to as much as six minutes. At the top of the categorized climbs, Lenny Martinez (Team Bahrain Victorious) targeted the polka-dot jersey, accumulating 27 points throughout the day to take the lead in the mountains classification. With three riders in the break, EF Education–EasyPost took up most of the pacemaking, putting Healy in the virtual yellow jersey. Over the course of the day, several attacks flew out of the break until only six riders remained up front heading to the final two climbs: Healy, Quinn Simmons (Lidl–Trek), Ben O'Connor (Team Jayco–AlUla), Simon Yates (Visma–Lease a Bike), Michael Storer (Tudor Pro Cycling Team), and Thymen Arensman (Ineos Grenadiers).

On the Col de la Croix Saint-Robert, Healy paced the front group by himself, attempting to keep himself in the virtual yellow jersey. On the final climb of the day – Puy de Sancy – Yates attacked from the bottom, only followed by O’Connor. After Arensman bridged up to the two, Yates put in another acceleration to go solo off the front. Arensman kept Yates within five seconds but he could not make the bridge as Yates won the stage. Healy overtook O’Connor on the road to finish third at 31 seconds down. In the GC group, Visma–Lease a Bike attacked several times inside the final 30 kilometres (19 mi) with Matteo Jorgenson and Sepp Kuss. Pogačar himself responded to Jorgenson's attacks while Jonas Vingegaard (Visma–Lease a Bike) stayed in his wheel. On the final climb, Remco Evenepoel (Soudal–Quick-Step) accelerated but he was not given much of a gap. Shortly after, Pogačar launched an attack that was only followed by Vingegaard. Both riders finished the stage at 4’ 51” down on Yates, with a small gap on the rest of the heavily reduced GC group consisting of Evenepoel, Jorgenson, Florian Lipowitz (Red Bull–Bora–Hansgrohe), Primož Roglič (Red Bull–Bora–Hansgrohe), Oscar Onley (Team Picnic–PostNL), and Tobias Halland Johannessen (Uno-X Mobility).

In the GC, Healy took over the yellow jersey with a lead of 29 seconds on Pogačar. Kévin Vauquelin (Arkéa–B&B Hotels) dropped to sixth after losing 46 seconds to Pogačar and Vingegaard. Johannessen entered the top ten after finishing with the reduced GC group. The sprinters finished in a group over 30 minutes behind the leaders, but were well within the time cut.

Stage 10 Result
| Rank | Rider | Team | Time |
|---|---|---|---|
| 1 | Simon Yates (GBR) | Visma–Lease a Bike | 4h 20' 05" |
| 2 | Thymen Arensman (NED) | Ineos Grenadiers | + 9" |
| 3 | Ben Healy (IRL) | EF Education–EasyPost | + 31" |
| 4 | Ben O'Connor (AUS) | Team Jayco–AlUla | + 49" |
| 5 | Michael Storer (AUS) | Tudor Pro Cycling Team | + 1' 23" |
| 6 | Joseph Blackmore (GBR) | Israel–Premier Tech | + 3' 57" |
| 7 | Anders Halland Johannessen (NOR) | Uno-X Mobility | + 4' 38" |
| 8 | Lenny Martinez (FRA) | Team Bahrain Victorious | + 4' 51" |
| 9 | Tadej Pogačar (SLO) | UAE Team Emirates XRG | + 4' 51" |
| 10 | Jonas Vingegaard (DEN) | Visma–Lease a Bike | + 4' 51" |

General classification after Stage 10
| Rank | Rider | Team | Time |
|---|---|---|---|
| 1 | Ben Healy (IRL) | EF Education–EasyPost | 37h 41' 49" |
| 2 | Tadej Pogačar (SLO) | UAE Team Emirates XRG | + 29" |
| 3 | Remco Evenepoel (BEL) | Soudal–Quick-Step | + 1' 29" |
| 4 | Jonas Vingegaard (DEN) | Visma–Lease a Bike | + 1' 46" |
| 5 | Matteo Jorgenson (USA) | Visma–Lease a Bike | + 2' 06" |
| 6 | Kévin Vauquelin (FRA) | Arkéa–B&B Hotels | + 2' 26" |
| 7 | Oscar Onley (GBR) | Team Picnic–PostNL | + 3' 24" |
| 8 | Florian Lipowitz (GER) | Red Bull–Bora–Hansgrohe | + 3' 34" |
| 9 | Primož Roglič (SLO) | Red Bull–Bora–Hansgrohe | + 3' 41" |
| 10 | Tobias Halland Johannessen (NOR) | Uno-X Mobility | + 5' 03" |

== Rest day 1 ==
15 July 2025 – Toulouse

== Stage 11 ==
16 July 2025 – Toulouse to Toulouse, 156.8 km (97.4 mi)

After the first rest day, the eleventh stage looped around Toulouse in the Occitania region, with five categorized climbs (one third-category and four fourth-category) on the route. The final climb, the Côte de Pech David, (800 m at 12.4%) topped with just 8.8 kilometres (5.5 mi) to go.

At the start of the stage, Jonas Abrahamsen (Uno-X Mobility), Mauro Schmid (Team Jayco–AlUla), and Davide Ballerini (XDS Astana Team) were able to get a gap on the peloton. While they were able to increase their advantage, the fight to get to the break continued as constant attacks flew behind them. Due to the fast pace, there were multiple splits in the peloton with the likes of Ben Healy (EF Education–EasyPost) and Tadej Pogačar (UAE Team Emirates XRG) getting caught behind at one point but the peloton would eventually reform. With 82 kilometres (51 mi) left, Mathieu Burgaudeau (Team TotalEnergies) and Fred Wright (Team Bahrain Victorious) managed to bridge to the trio up front. The peloton briefly eased up, increasing the break's advantage to almost two minutes before attacks began again. At one point, Jonas Vingegaard (Visma–Lease a Bike) and Healy were in a group ahead of the peloton but the gaps in the peloton were closed. Eventually, a first chase group consisting of Mathieu van der Poel (Alpecin–Deceuninck), Wout van Aert (Visma–Lease a Bike), Arnaud De Lie (Lotto), Quinn Simmons (Lidl–Trek), and Axel Laurance (Ineos Grenadiers) managed to go in pursuit of the breakaway while the peloton finally eased up.

As the race approached the final two climbs, the chasers got to within 20 seconds of the front group but they were not able to make the bridge. On the Côte de Vielle-Toulouse with around 14 kilometres (8.7 mi) remaining, Abrahamsen and Schmid accelerated off the front while Simmons made an attack of his own, managing to form a chase group with Wright and Burgaudeau. The lead duo entered the final climb with a lead of around 20 seconds over the first chase group while the group of van der Poel and van Aert were a further 20 seconds down. On the Côte de Pech David, van der Poel launched an attack, going past the first chase group and soloing off in pursuit of Abrahamsen and Schmid, who were still leading by about 20 seconds on the Dutchman. Van der Poel closed to within less than 10 seconds but he fell short of catching the duo up front, who sprinted for the win. Schmid led out the sprint before Abrahamsen came around him to win his first Grand Tour stage as well as the team's first Grand Tour stage. In the peloton, there were attacks by Kévin Vauquelin (Arkéa–B&B Hotels) and Vingegaard on the final climb but things would come back together. After the climb, Pogačar crashed after accidentally contacting with Tobias Halland Johannessen (Uno-X Mobility), but he was not seriously hurt. The GC group ended up waiting for Pogačar, which meant that the top of the GC remained unchanged before the race headed into the Pyrenees.

Stage 11 Result
| Rank | Rider | Team | Time |
|---|---|---|---|
| 1 | Jonas Abrahamsen (NOR) | Uno-X Mobility | 3h 15' 56" |
| 2 | Mauro Schmid (SUI) | Team Jayco–AlUla | + 0" |
| 3 | Mathieu van der Poel (NED) | Alpecin–Deceuninck | + 7" |
| 4 | Arnaud De Lie (BEL) | Lotto | + 53" |
| 5 | Wout van Aert (BEL) | Visma–Lease a Bike | + 53" |
| 6 | Axel Laurance (FRA) | Ineos Grenadiers | + 53" |
| 7 | Fred Wright (GBR) | Team Bahrain Victorious | + 53" |
| 8 | Mathieu Burgaudeau (FRA) | Team TotalEnergies | + 53" |
| 9 | Quinn Simmons (USA) | Lidl–Trek | + 53" |
| 10 | Davide Ballerini (ITA) | XDS Astana Team | + 1' 11" |

General classification after Stage 11
| Rank | Rider | Team | Time |
|---|---|---|---|
| 1 | Ben Healy (IRL) | EF Education–EasyPost | 41h 01' 13" |
| 2 | Tadej Pogačar (SLO) | UAE Team Emirates XRG | + 29" |
| 3 | Remco Evenepoel (BEL) | Soudal–Quick-Step | + 1' 29" |
| 4 | Jonas Vingegaard (DEN) | Visma–Lease a Bike | + 1' 46" |
| 5 | Matteo Jorgenson (USA) | Visma–Lease a Bike | + 2' 06" |
| 6 | Kévin Vauquelin (FRA) | Arkéa–B&B Hotels | + 2' 26" |
| 7 | Oscar Onley (GBR) | Team Picnic–PostNL | + 3' 24" |
| 8 | Florian Lipowitz (GER) | Red Bull–Bora–Hansgrohe | + 3' 34" |
| 9 | Primož Roglič (SLO) | Red Bull–Bora–Hansgrohe | + 3' 41" |
| 10 | Tobias Halland Johannessen (NOR) | Uno-X Mobility | + 5' 03" |
