= Guerlédan =

- Commune
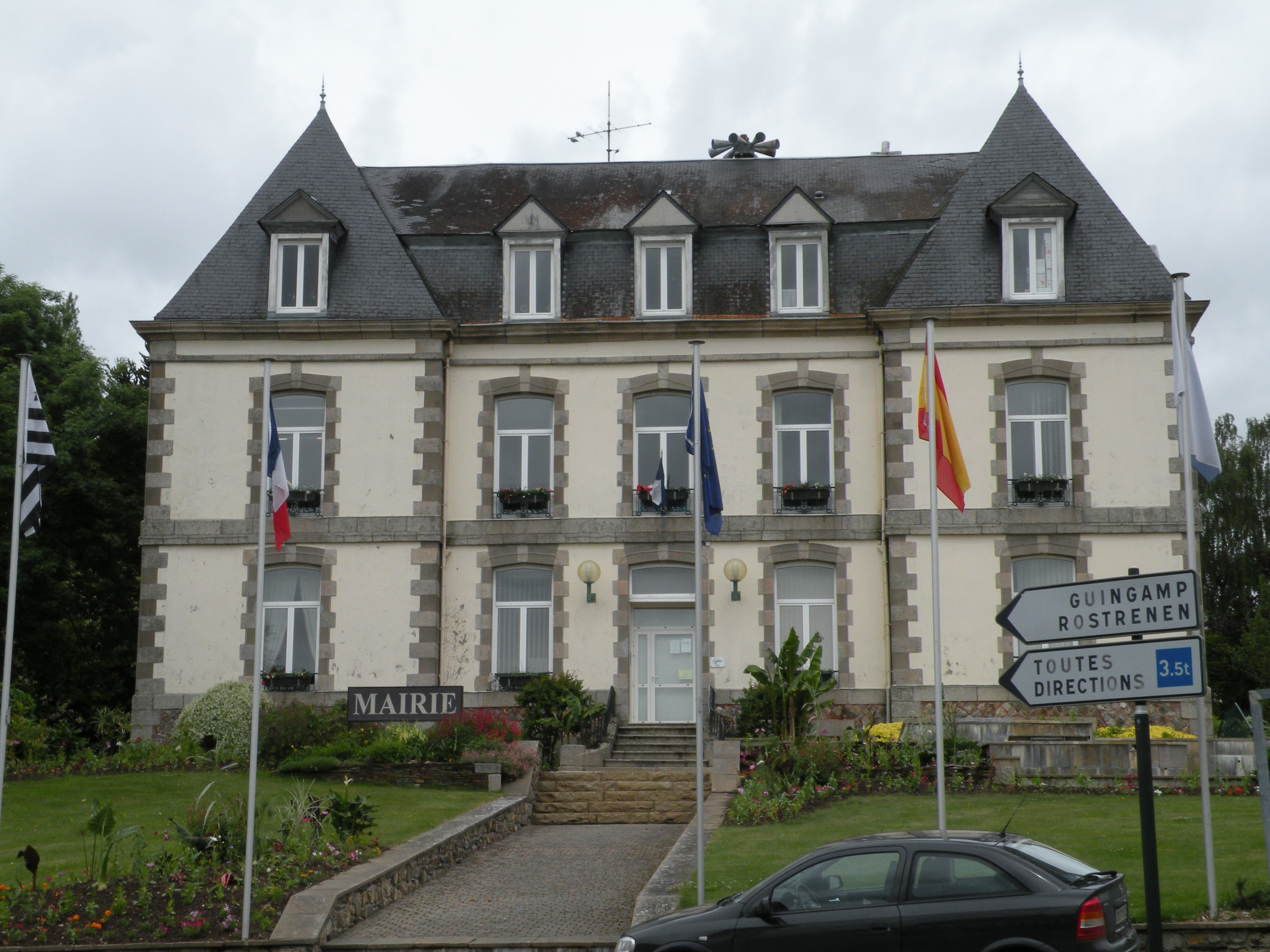
- The town hall in Mûr-de-Bretagne
- Location of Guerlédan
- Location within France Location within Brittany
- Coordinates: 48°12′04″N 2°59′06″W
- Country: France
- Region: Brittany
- Department: Côtes-d'Armor
- Arrondissement: Saint-Brieuc
- Canton: Guerlédan
- Intercommunality: Loudéac Communauté − Bretagne Centre

Government
  - Mayor (2022–2026): Eric Le Boudec
- Area^{1}: 47.75 km^{2} (18.44 sq mi)
- Population (2023): 2,532
  - Density: 53.03/km^{2} (137.3/sq mi)
- Time zone: UTC+01:00 (CET)
  - Summer (DST): UTC+02:00 (CEST)
- INSEE/Postal code: 22158 /22530
- ^{1} French Land Register data, which excludes lakes, ponds, glaciers > 1 km^{2} (0.386 sq mi or 247 acres) and river estuaries.

Guerlédan (French pronunciation: [ɡɛʁledɑ̃]; Breton: Gwerledan) is a commune in the department of Côtes-d'Armor, western France. The municipality was established on 1 January 2017 by merger of the former communes of Mûr-de-Bretagne (the seat) and Saint-Guen. This commune chose its name in reference to the Lake Guerlédan which is on its territory.

== Population ==
Population data refer to the commune in its geography as of January 2025.

Historical population
Year	Pop.	±% p.a.
1968	2,686	—
1975	2,608	−0.42%
1982	2,526	−0.46%
1990	2,499	−0.13%
1999	2,552	+0.23%
2007	2,546	−0.03%
2012	2,564	+0.14%
2017	2,444	−0.95%
2023	2,532	+0.59%
Source: INSEE

== See also ==
- Communes of the Côtes-d'Armor department
