= Saint-Guen =

Saint-Guen Sant-Wenn
- Part of Guerlédan
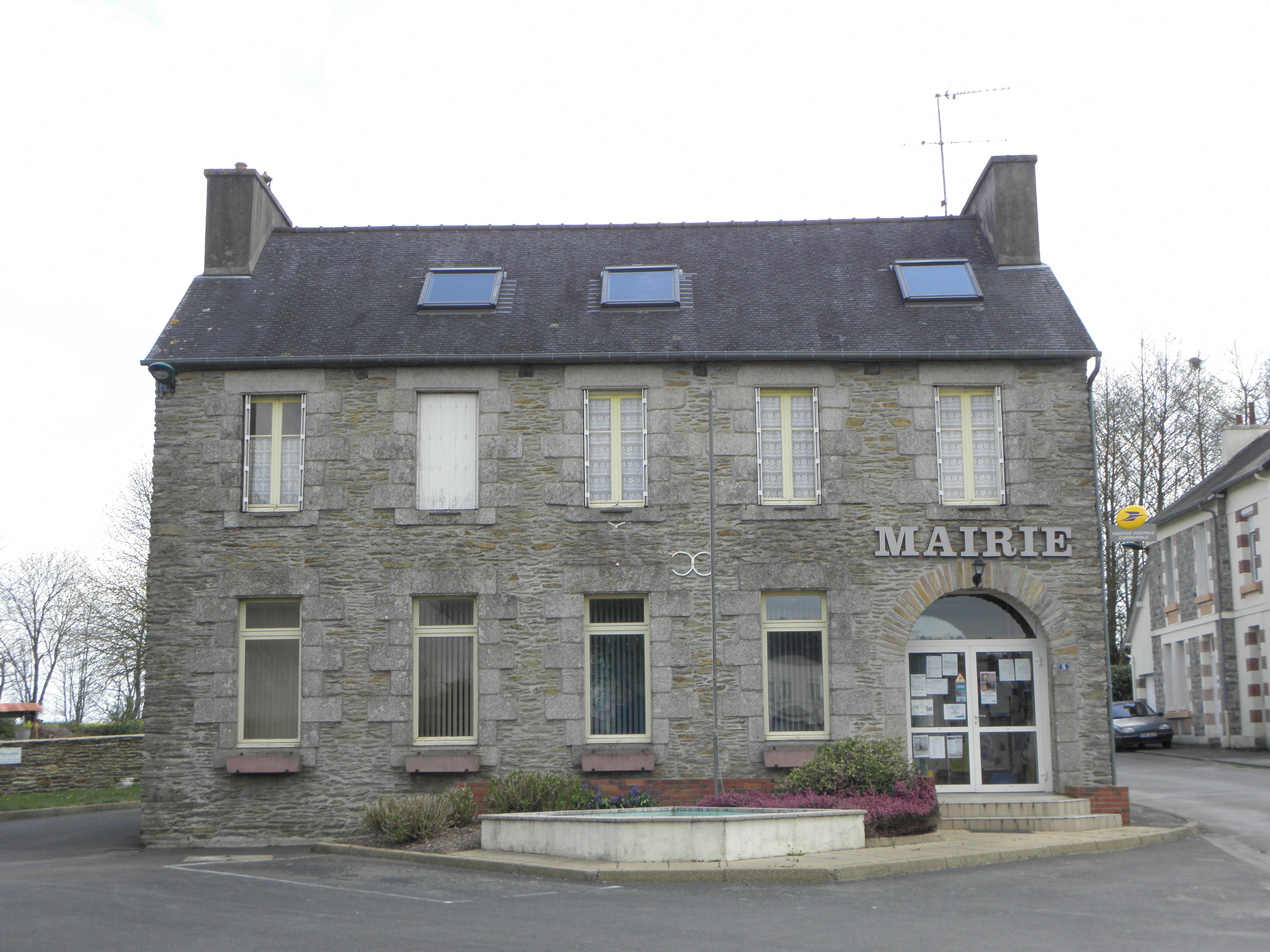
- Town hall
- Location of Saint-Guen
- Location within France Location within Brittany
- Coordinates: 48°13′05″N 2°56′07″W
- Country: France
- Region: Brittany
- Department: Côtes-d'Armor
- Arrondissement: Guingamp
- Canton: Guerlédan
- Commune: Guerlédan
- Area^{1}: 17.95 km^{2} (6.93 sq mi)
- Highest elevation: 232 m (761 ft)
- Lowest elevation: 119 m (390 ft)
- Population (2022): 440
  - Density: 25/km^{2} (63/sq mi)
- Time zone: UTC+01:00 (CET)
  - Summer (DST): UTC+02:00 (CEST)
- Postal code: 22530
- ^{1} French Land Register data, which excludes lakes, ponds, glaciers > 1 km^{2} (0.386 sq mi or 247 acres) and river estuaries.

Saint-Guen (French pronunciation: [sɛ̃ ɡɥɛ̃]; Breton: Sant-Wenn) is a former commune in the Côtes-d'Armor department of Brittany in northwestern France. On 1 January 2017, it was merged into the new commune Guerlédan.

== Population ==
Inhabitants of Saint-Guen are called saint-guennois in French.

== See also ==
- Communes of the Côtes-d'Armor department
