= Lake Guerlédan =

Lac de Guerlédan
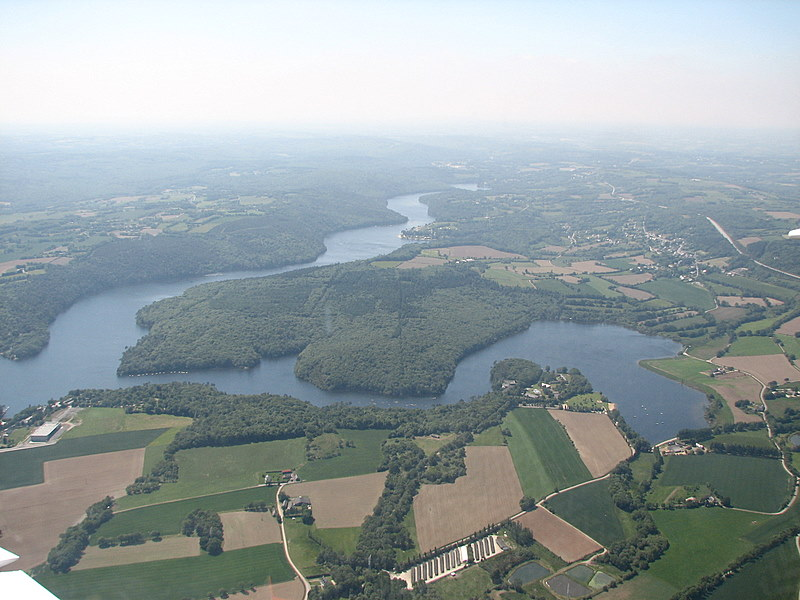

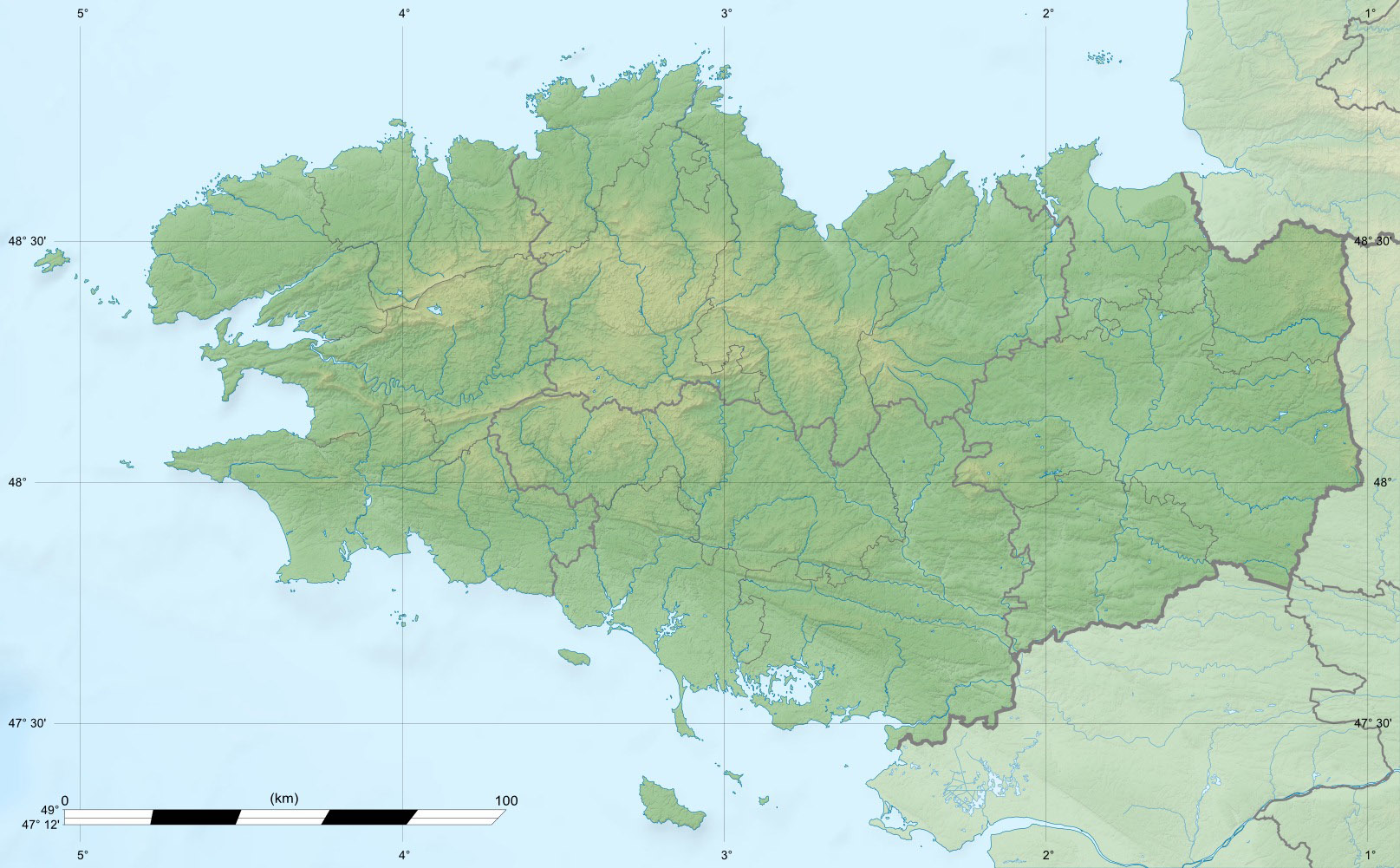
- Location within Brittany
- Location: Saint-Aignan and Mûr-de-Bretagne
- Coordinates: 48°12′15″N 3°3′0″W
- Type: artificial
- Primary outflows: Blavet
- Basin countries: France
- Max. length: 10 km (6.2 mi)
- Surface area: 4 km^{2} (1.5 sq mi)
- Max. depth: 50 m (160 ft)
- Surface elevation: 121 m (397 ft)

Lake Guerlédan (French pronunciation: [ɡɛʁledɑ̃]; Breton: Lenn Gwerledan) is an artificial lake in the centre of Brittany, France. It extends across the borders of the departments of Morbihan and Côtes-d'Armor, within the communes of Saint-Aignan, Morbihan and Mûr-de-Bretagne. At an elevation of 121 m, its surface area is 4 km^{2}. Lake Guerlédan is the largest artificial lake in Brittany.

This Lake was created to power the dam of Guerlédan. Construction took seven years from 1923 to 1930, and encountered many geological, technical and financial difficulties. The creation of the lake and especially that of the dam cut the through the Nantes-Brest canal which from this location, followed the course of the river Blavet. Seventeen of the old locks on the canal were submerged in the Lake. Lake Guerlédan is now a tourist attraction, offering various watersports, walks and panoramic views.

During World War II, the Breton nationalist architect James Bouillé advocated a radical plan to build a new Breton capital city on the shores of Lake Guerlédan, to be called "Brittia". Bouillé believed this could be a "Celtic Brasilia".

Beginning in 1951, the Lake was regularly drained for repair, the last time being in 2015, revealing a hidden landscape of submerged locks and buildings. Modern technology will reduce this frequency but now (2015) the lake has been temporarily drained for the last time in a generation; new maintenance access is being installed so that the dam's hydro-electric system can be checked without the need to drain.
