= Saint-Aignan, Morbihan =

Saint-Aignan Sant-Inan
- Commune
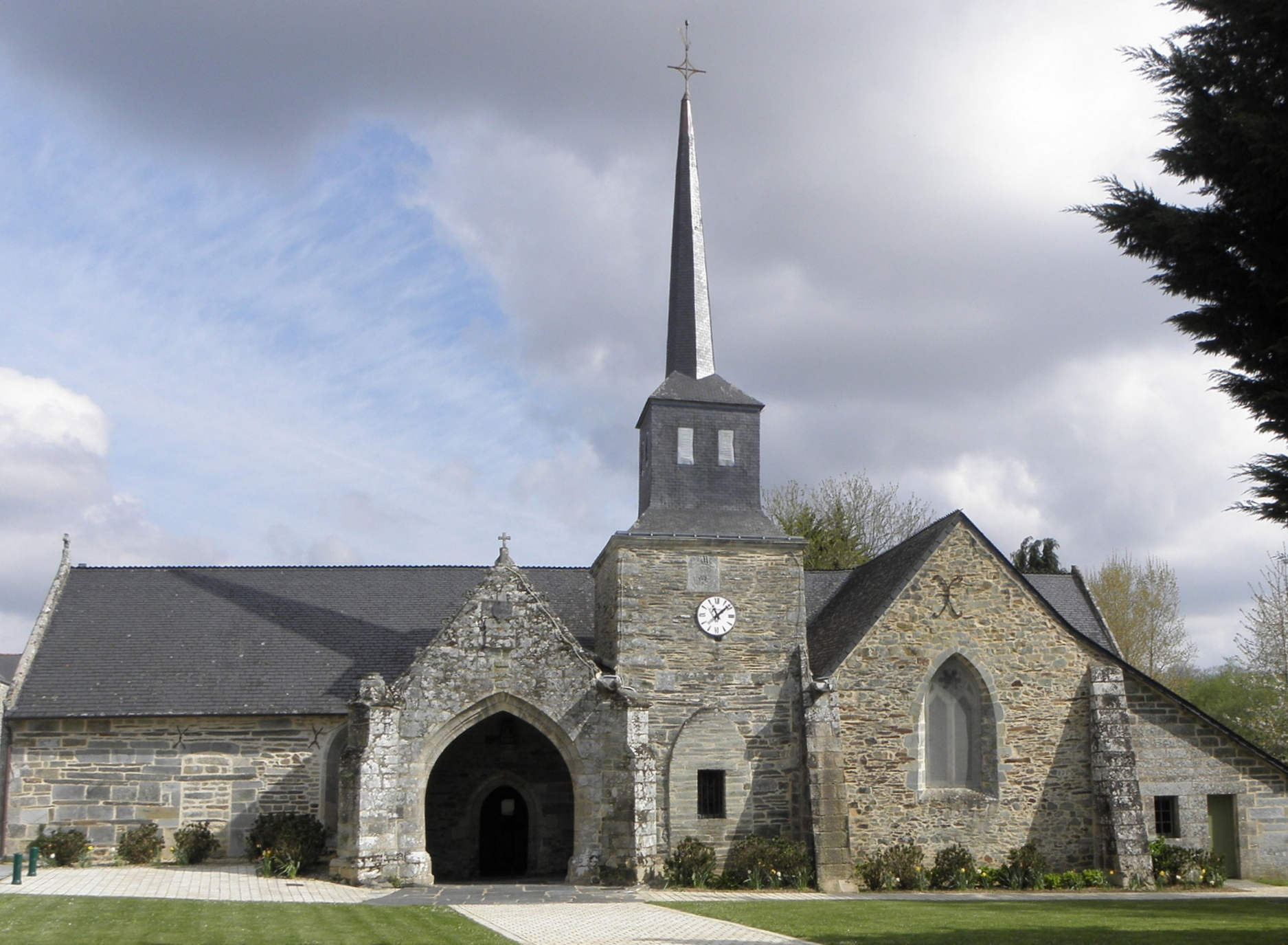
- The church in Saint-Aignan

- Coat of arms
- Location of Saint-Aignan
- Location within France Location within Brittany
- Coordinates: 48°10′56″N 3°00′45″W
- Country: France
- Region: Brittany
- Department: Morbihan
- Arrondissement: Pontivy
- Canton: Gourin
- Intercommunality: Pontivy Communauté

Government
  - Mayor (2026–32): Guy Gautier
- Area^{1}: 27.33 km^{2} (10.55 sq mi)
- Highest elevation: 275 m (902 ft)
- Lowest elevation: 67 m (220 ft)
- Population (2023): 637
  - Density: 23.3/km^{2} (60.4/sq mi)
- Time zone: UTC+01:00 (CET)
  - Summer (DST): UTC+02:00 (CEST)
- INSEE/Postal code: 56203 /56480
- ^{1} French Land Register data, which excludes lakes, ponds, glaciers > 1 km^{2} (0.386 sq mi or 247 acres) and river estuaries.

Saint-Aignan (French pronunciation: [sɛ̃.t‿ɛɲɑ̃]; Breton: Sant-Inan) is a commune in the Morbihan department of Brittany in north-western France. Inhabitants of Saint-Aignan are called in French Saintaignanais.

== See also ==
- Communes of the Morbihan department
