= Mûr-de-Bretagne =

Mûr-de-Bretagne Mur
- Part of Guerlédan
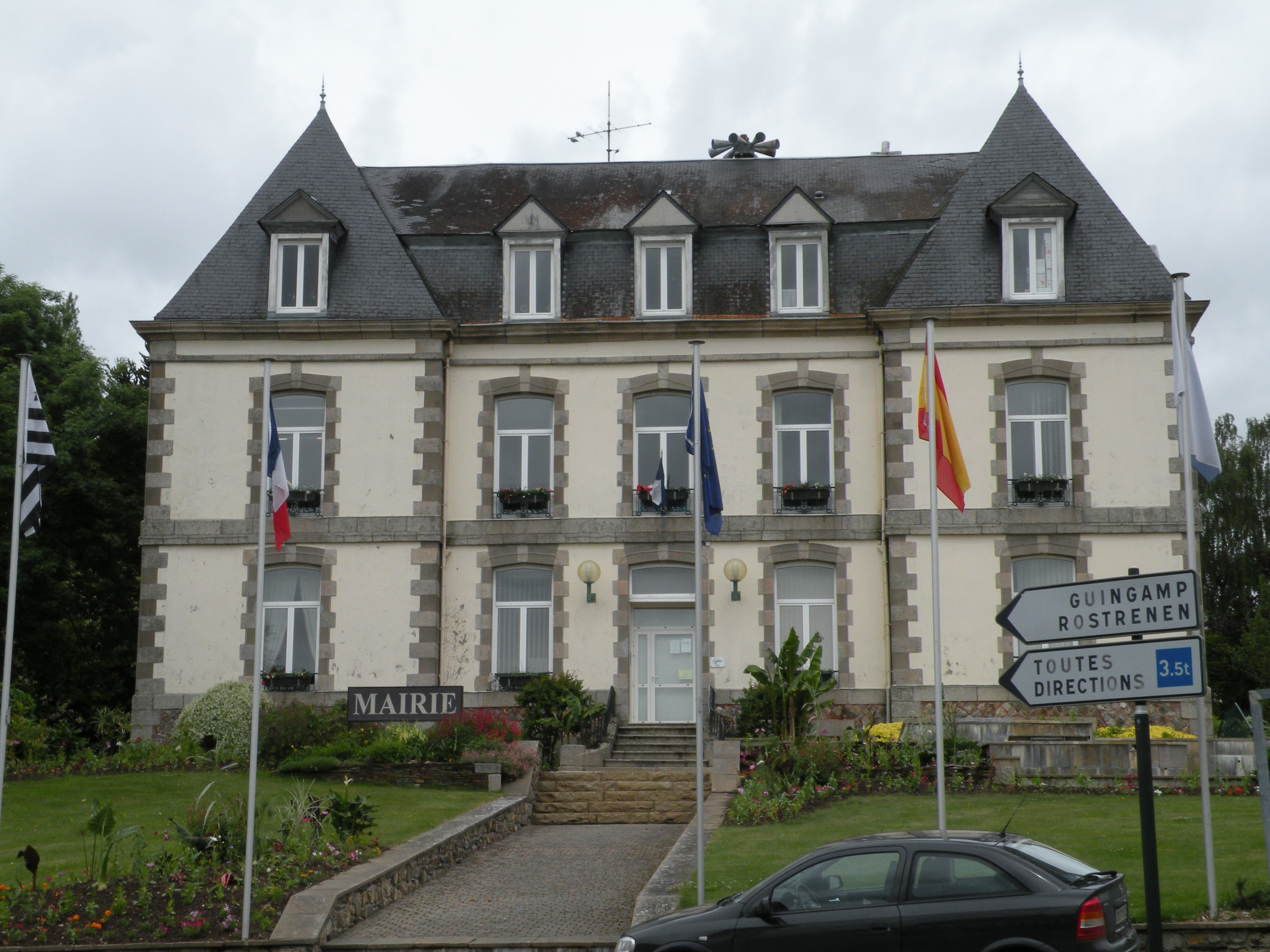
- The town hall of Mûr-de-Bretagne

- Flag Coat of arms
- Location of Mûr-de-Bretagne
- Location within France Location within Brittany
- Coordinates: 48°12′03″N 2°59′05″W
- Country: France
- Region: Brittany
- Department: Côtes-d'Armor
- Arrondissement: Guingamp
- Canton: Guerlédan
- Commune: Guerlédan
- Area^{1}: 29.80 km^{2} (11.51 sq mi)
- Highest elevation: 290 m (950 ft)
- Lowest elevation: 69 m (226 ft)
- Population (2022): 2,088
  - Density: 70.07/km^{2} (181.5/sq mi)
- Time zone: UTC+01:00 (CET)
  - Summer (DST): UTC+02:00 (CEST)
- Postal code: 22530
- ^{1} French Land Register data, which excludes lakes, ponds, glaciers > 1 km^{2} (0.386 sq mi or 247 acres) and river estuaries.

Mûr-de-Bretagne (French pronunciation: [myʁ də bʁətaɲ], literally Mûr of Brittany; Breton: Mur) is a town and former commune in the Côtes-d'Armor department, Brittany, northwestern France. On 1 January 2017, the former commune was merged into the new commune Guerlédan.

== Geography ==
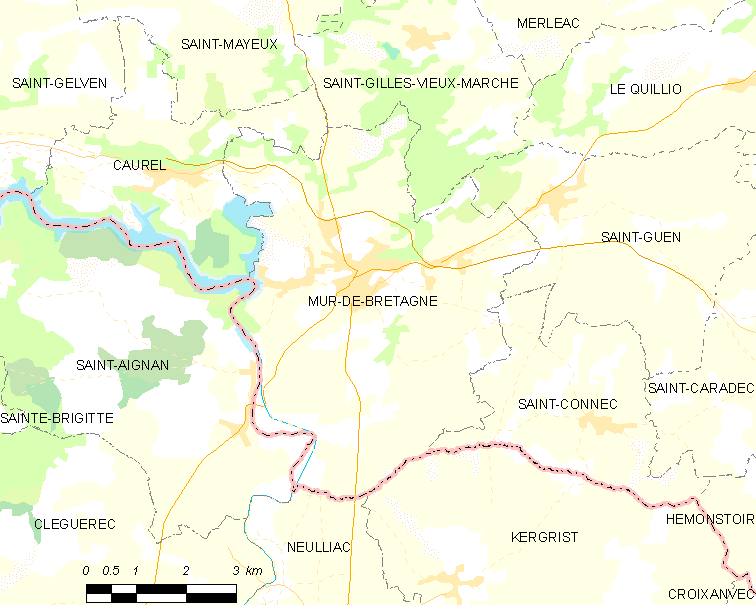
Map of the former commune

Mûr-de-Bretagne is a small town with shops, located east of the Lac de Guerlédan.

== Toponymy ==
The old forms of the name are: Mur (1283), Mur (1368), Mur (1516), Mur (1536), Meur (1630).

The name of the commune translated into Breton is Mur.

== Transportation ==
The town was previously served by a train station. The line on which it was on is now a cycleway

== Politics and administration ==
List of mayors of Mûr-de-Bretagne
Start	End	Name	Party	Other details
1809	1815	Guillaume Michel Fraboullet		
...	...	Raymond Hinault		
June 1995	2008	Alain Auffret	Independent	Farmer
March 2008	...	Georges Tilly	Independent	Retired, President of the CC
2014	In progress	Hervé Le Lu	Independent	Art director

== Demographics ==
Historical population

Year	Pop.	±% p.a.
1793	1,891	—
1800	2,096	+1.48%
1806	1,819	−2.33%
1821	1,951	+0.47%
1831	2,354	+1.90%
1836	2,283	−0.61%
1841	2,267	−0.14%
1846	2,413	+1.26%
1851	2,403	−0.08%
1856	2,333	−0.59%
1861	2,362	+0.25%
1866	2,534	+1.42%
1872	2,510	−0.16%

Year	Pop.	±% p.a.
1876	2,508	−0.02%
1881	2,581	+0.58%
1886	2,528	−0.41%
1891	2,433	−0.76%
1896	2,489	+0.46%
1901	2,574	+0.67%
1906	2,436	−1.10%
1911	2,417	−0.16%
1921	2,254	−0.70%
1926	2,149	−0.95%
1931	2,233	+0.77%
1936	2,265	+0.28%
1946	2,409	+0.62%

Year	Pop.	±% p.a.
1954	2,116	−1.61%
1962	2,125	+0.05%
1968	2,075	−0.40%
1975	2,105	+0.21%
1982	2,091	−0.10%
1990	2,049	−0.25%
1999	2,090	+0.22%
2007	2,089	−0.01%
2012	2,106	+0.16%
2017	2,026	−0.77%
2022	2,088	+0.60%

From 1962 to 1999: Population without double counting; for the years following: municipal population.
Source: Ldh/EHESS/Cassini until 1999 then INSEE from 2007

The inhabitants of Mûr-de-Bretagne are known in French as mûrois.

== Local culture and heritage ==
=== Places and monuments ===
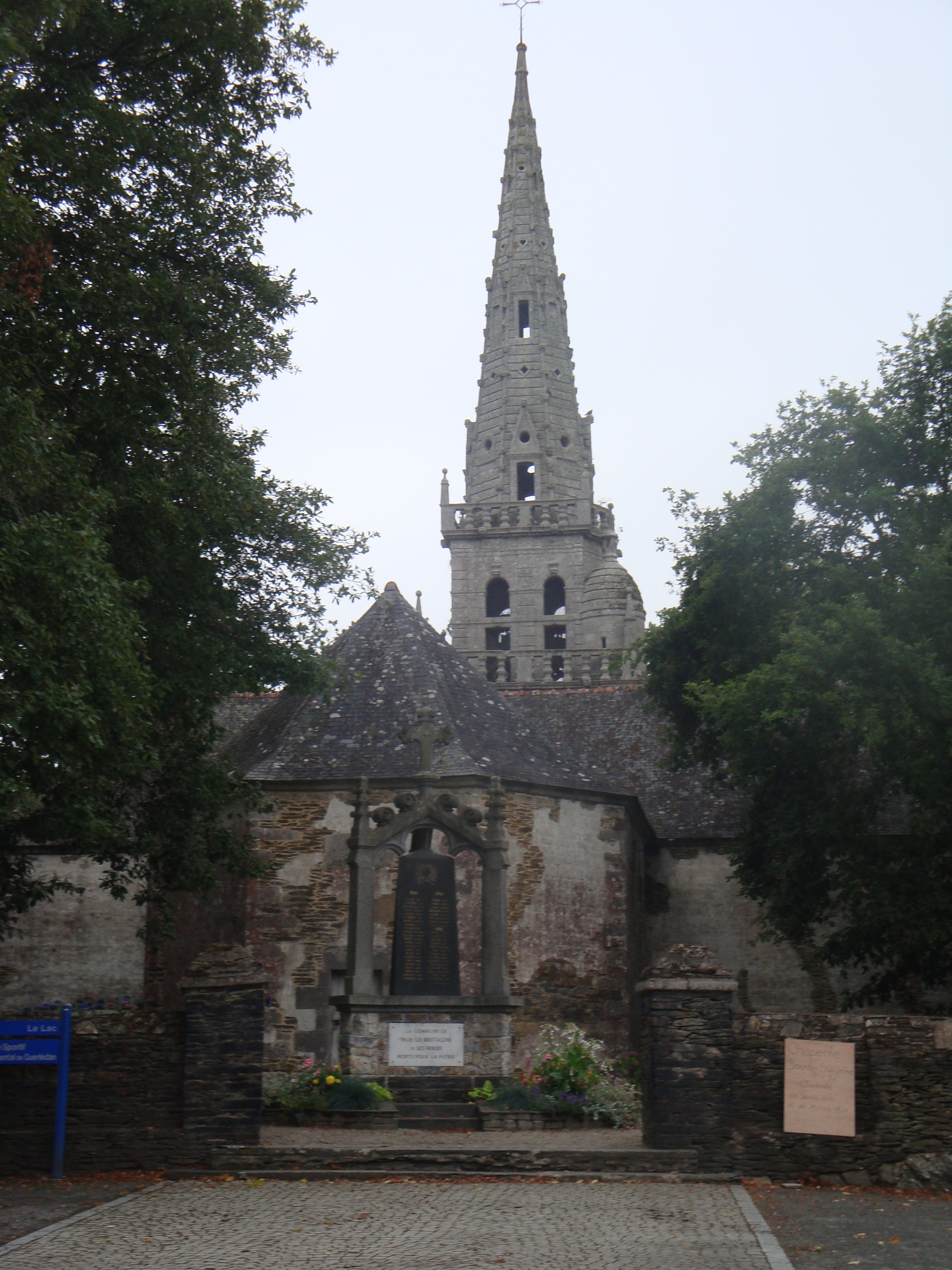
The Chapel of Sainte-Suzanne

- The chapel Sainte-Suzanne is classified as an historical monument since 4 June 1952. It is surrounded by oak trees painted around 1840-1850 by Jean-Baptiste Corot.
- Church of Saint-Pierre: indoors, altars and chairs carved by a local artist. On the pulpit, sculpted panels represent the seven deadly sins.
- The Allée couverte de Coët Correc, classified as an historical monument on 8 November 1956.
- Château de La Roche-Guéhennec
- Dam and Lake Guerlédan.
- Base de plein air et de loisirs de Guerlédan

=== Sport ===
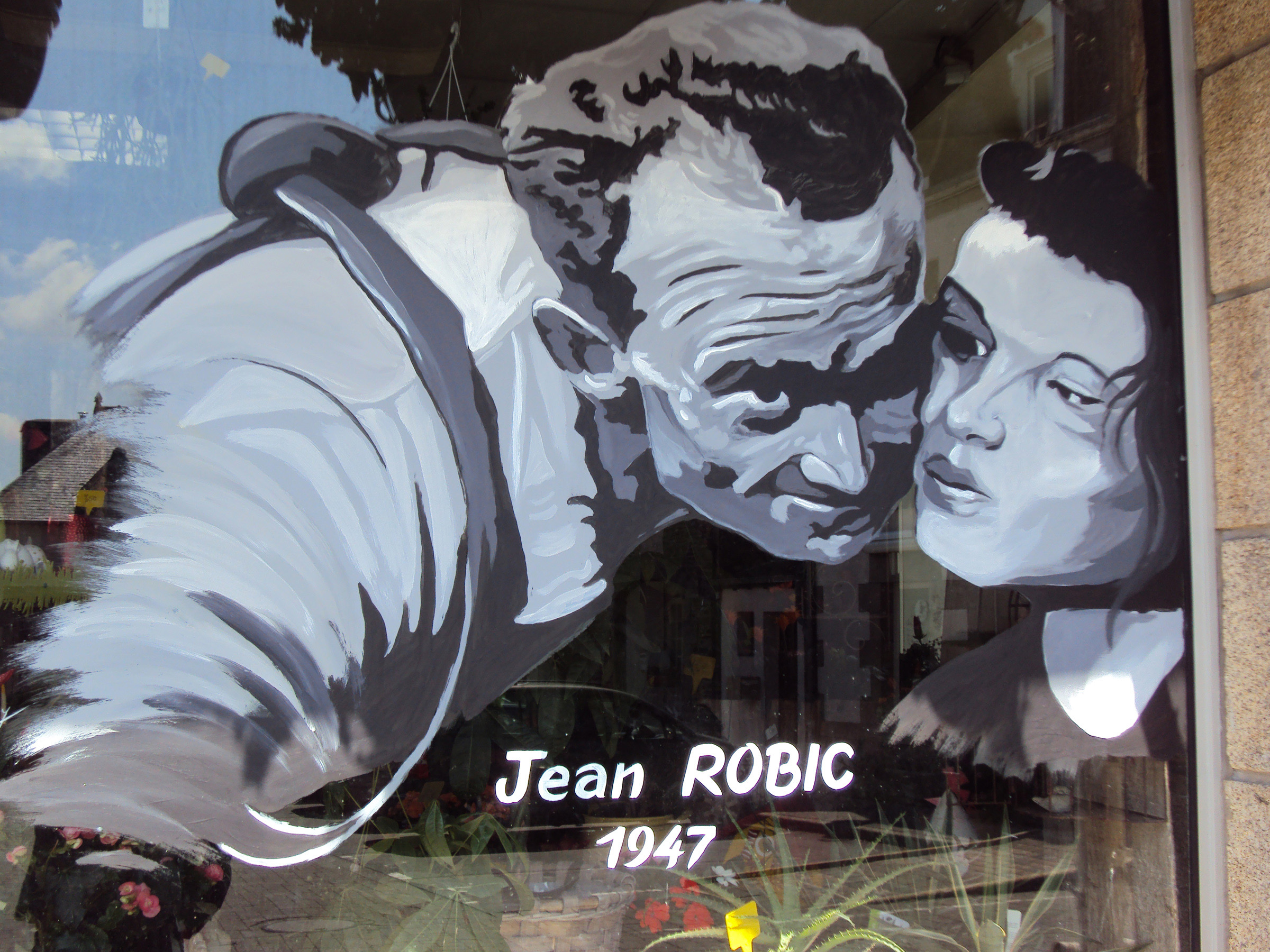
A painting of Jean Robic - Mûr-de-Bretagne - Tour de France 2011.

Mûr has featured in multiple editions of the Tour de France Mûr was the end of the fourth stage of the 2011 Tour de France; Cadel Evans won the stage in 2011 and went on to win the Tour. Mûr hosted the finish of the eighth stage of the 2015 Tour de France. Alexis Vuillermoz took the win. On 17 October 2017, it was announced it would be the finish line for the 6th stage of the 2018 Tour de France on 12 July 2018. Irish cyclist Dan Martin from UAE Team Emirates XRG took the stage. On 27 June 2021, Mathieu van der Poel of Team Alpecin-Fenix won the second stage of the Tour de France at Mûr. And on 11 July 2025, Tadej Pogacar of UAE Team Emirates-XRG won stage seven of the Tour de France at Mûr.

Year	Stage	Category	Start	Finish	Leader at the summit
2025	7 (2)	3	Saint-Malo	Mûr-de-Bretagne	Tadej Pogačar (SLO)
2025	7 (1)	3	Saint-Malo	Mûr-de-Bretagne	Ewen Costiou (FRA)
2021	2 (2)	3	Perros-Guirec	Mûr-de-Bretagne	Mathieu van der Poel (NED)
2021	2 (1)	3	Perros-Guirec	Mûr-de-Bretagne	Mathieu van der Poel (NED)
2018	6 (2)	3	Brest	Mûr-de-Bretagne	Daniel Martin (IRL)
2018	6 (1)	3	Brest	Mûr-de-Bretagne	Toms Skujiņš (LAT)
2015	8	3	Rennes	Mûr-de-Bretagne	Alexis Vuillermoz (FRA)
2011	4	3	Lorient	Mûr-de-Bretagne	Cadel Evans (AUS)
2008	2	3	Auray	Saint-Brieuc	Sylvain Chavanel (FRA)
2006	8	3	Saint-Méen-le-Grand	Lorient	Sylvain Calzati (FRA)
2004	8	3	Lamballe	Quimper	Ronny Scholz (GER)
1993	3	?	Vannes	Dinard	Laurent Desbiens (FRA)
1977	9	3	Lorient	Rennes	Lucien Van Impe (BEL)
1947	19		Vannes	Saint-Brieuc	Raymond Impanis (BEL)
1938	3		Saint-Brieuc	Nantes	

=== Heraldry ===
Arms of Mûr-de-Bretagne	The arms of Mûr-de-Bretagne are blazoned : Of azure to a cross engrailed or, to a franc-canton gules, charged four macles of argent raised 2,2.

== See also ==
- Communes of the Côtes-d'Armor department
- Lac de Guerlédan

== Bibliography ==
- Le Barzic, E. (1946). Mûr de Bretagne et sa région [Mur de Bretagne and its region]. Guide officiel du syndicat d'initiative (in French). Quimper: Nature et Bretagne. 480.
