= List of teams and cyclists in the 2018 Tour de France =

List of cyclists

The number of riders per nation participated in the 2018 Tour de France: 20+ / 10–19 / 2–9 / 1

The 2018 Tour de France was the 105th edition of the race, one of cycling's Grand Tours. The 21-stage race takes place from 7 July to 29 July 2018. All eighteen Union Cycliste Internationale (UCI) WorldTeams were automatically invited and were obliged to attend the race. Four UCI Professional Continental teams were given wildcard places into the race by the organiser – Amaury Sport Organisation (ASO) – to complete the 22-team peloton. As each team was entitled to enter eight riders, the peloton on the first stage consisted of 176 riders from 30 countries.

== Teams ==
UCI WorldTeams

- AG2R La Mondiale
- Astana
- Bahrain–Merida
- BMC Racing Team
- Bora–Hansgrohe
- Team Dimension Data
- EF Education First–Drapac p/b Cannondale
- Team Katusha–Alpecin
- LottoNL–Jumbo
- Lotto–Soudal
- Movistar Team
- Mitchelton–Scott
- Quick-Step Floors
- Team Sky
- Team Sunweb
- Trek–Segafredo
- UAE Team Emirates
- Groupama–FDJ

UCI Professional Continental teams

- Cofidis
- Direct Énergie
- Fortuneo–Samsic
- Wanty–Groupe Gobert

== Cyclists ==
Legend
No.	Starting number worn by the rider during the Tour
Pos.	Position in the general classification
Time	Deficit to the winner of the general classification
‡	Denotes riders born on or after 1 January 1993 eligible for the young rider classification
General classification	Denotes the winner of the general classification
Points classification	Denotes the winner of the points classification
Mountains classification	Denotes the winner of the mountains classification
Young rider classification	Denotes the winner of the young rider classification (eligibility indicated by ‡)
Team classification	Denotes riders that represent the winner of the team classification
Super-combativity award	Denotes the winner of the super-combativity award
DNS	Denotes a rider who did not start a stage, followed by the stage before which he withdrew
DNF	Denotes a rider who did not finish a stage, followed by the stage in which he withdrew
DSQ	Denotes a rider who was disqualified from the race, followed by the stage in which this occurred
HD	Denotes a rider finished outside the time limit, followed by the stage in which they did so
Age correct as of Saturday 7 July 2018, the date on which the Tour began

=== By starting number ===
No.	Name	Nationality	Team	Age	Pos.	Time	Ref.
1	Chris Froome	Great Britain	Team Sky	33	3	+ 2' 24"	
2	Egan Bernal ‡	Colombia	Team Sky	21	15	+ 27' 52"	
3	Jonathan Castroviejo	Spain	Team Sky	31	70	+ 2h 36' 06"	
4	Michał Kwiatkowski	Poland	Team Sky	28	49	+ 2h 05' 29"	
5	Gianni Moscon ‡	Italy	Team Sky	24	DSQ-15	–	
6	Wout Poels	Netherlands	Team Sky	30	58	+ 2h 13' 23"	
7	Luke Rowe	Great Britain	Team Sky	28	128	+ 3h 50' 55"	
8	Geraint Thomas	Great Britain	Team Sky	32	1	83h 17' 13"	
11	Rigoberto Urán	Colombia	EF Education First–Drapac p/b Cannondale	31	DNS-12	–	
12	Simon Clarke	Australia	EF Education First–Drapac p/b Cannondale	31	100	+ 3h 15' 40"	
13	Lawson Craddock	United States	EF Education First–Drapac p/b Cannondale	26	145	+ 4h 34' 19"	
14	Daniel Martínez ‡	Colombia	EF Education First–Drapac p/b Cannondale	22	36	+ 1h 38' 38"	
15	Taylor Phinney	United States	EF Education First–Drapac p/b Cannondale	28	136	+ 3h 59' 07"	
16	Pierre Rolland	France	EF Education First–Drapac p/b Cannondale	31	27	+ 1h 09' 09"	
17	Tom Scully	New Zealand	EF Education First–Drapac p/b Cannondale	28	129	+ 3h 50' 59"	
18	Sep Vanmarcke	Belgium	EF Education First–Drapac p/b Cannondale	29	115	+ 3h 34' 17"	
21	Romain Bardet	France	AG2R La Mondiale	27	6	+ 6' 57"	
22	Silvan Dillier	Switzerland	AG2R La Mondiale	27	83	+ 2h 55' 15"	
23	Axel Domont	France	AG2R La Mondiale	27	DNF-4	–	
24	Mathias Frank	Switzerland	AG2R La Mondiale	31	55	+ 2h 10' 29"	
25	Tony Gallopin	France	AG2R La Mondiale	30	DNF-12	–	
26	Pierre Latour ‡	France	AG2R La Mondiale	24	13	+ 22' 13"	
27	Oliver Naesen	Belgium	AG2R La Mondiale	27	66	+ 2h 29' 36"	
28	Alexis Vuillermoz	France	AG2R La Mondiale	30	DNS-10	–	
31	Michael Matthews	Australia	Team Sunweb	27	DNS-5	–	
32	Tom Dumoulin	Netherlands	Team Sunweb	27	2	+ 1' 51"	
33	Nikias Arndt	Germany	Team Sunweb	26	67	+ 2h 32' 02"	
34	Simon Geschke	Germany	Team Sunweb	32	25	+ 50' 15"	
35	Chad Haga	United States	Team Sunweb	29	72	+ 2h 39' 40"	
36	Søren Kragh Andersen ‡	Denmark	Team Sunweb	23	52	+ 2h 06' 23"	
37	Laurens Ten Dam	Netherlands	Team Sunweb	37	51	+ 2h 06' 22"	
38	Edward Theuns	Belgium	Team Sunweb	27	88	+ 3h 02' 15"	
41	Warren Barguil	France	Fortuneo–Samsic	26	17	+ 37' 06"	
42	Maxime Bouet	France	Fortuneo–Samsic	31	42	+ 1h 58' 08"	
43	Élie Gesbert ‡	France	Fortuneo–Samsic	23	86	+ 3h 00' 48"	
44	Romain Hardy	France	Fortuneo–Samsic	29	105	+ 3h 19' 49"	
45	Kevin Ledanois ‡	France	Fortuneo–Samsic	24	96	+ 3h 11' 55"	
46	Amaël Moinard	France	Fortuneo–Samsic	36	48	+ 2h 03' 20"	
47	Laurent Pichon	France	Fortuneo–Samsic	31	98	+ 3h 12' 45"	
48	Florian Vachon	France	Fortuneo–Samsic	33	99	+ 3h 13' 47"	
51	Vincenzo Nibali	Italy	Bahrain–Merida	33	DNS-13	–	
52	Sonny Colbrelli ‡	Italy	Bahrain–Merida	28	109	+ 3h 21' 55"	
53	Heinrich Haussler	Australia	Bahrain–Merida	34	125	+ 3h 42' 24"	
54	Gorka Izagirre	Spain	Bahrain–Merida	30	24	+ 50' 02"	
55	Ion Izagirre	Spain	Bahrain–Merida	29	22	+ 46' 36"	
56	Kristijan Koren	Slovenia	Bahrain–Merida	31	102	+ 3h 16' 54"	
57	Franco Pellizotti	Italy	Bahrain–Merida	40	60	+ 2h 17' 32"	
58	Domenico Pozzovivo	Italy	Bahrain–Merida	35	18	+ 39' 08"	
61	Adam Yates	Great Britain	Mitchelton–Scott	25	29	+ 1h 17' 35"	
62	Jack Bauer	New Zealand	Mitchelton–Scott	33	121	+ 3h 39' 02"	
63	Luke Durbridge	Australia	Mitchelton–Scott	27	118	+ 3h 37' 21"	
64	Mathew Hayman	Australia	Mitchelton–Scott	40	108	+ 3h 21' 55"	
65	Michael Hepburn	Australia	Mitchelton–Scott	26	117	+ 3h 36' 30"	
66	Damien Howson	Australia	Mitchelton–Scott	25	DNS-16	–	
67	Daryl Impey	South Africa	Mitchelton–Scott	31	46	+ 2h 00' 53"	
68	Mikel Nieve	Spain	Mitchelton–Scott	34	23	+ 49' 19"	
71	Nairo Quintana	Colombia	Movistar Team	28	10	+ 14' 18"	
72	Andrey Amador	Costa Rica	Movistar Team	31	50	+ 2h 05' 38"	
73	Daniele Bennati	Italy	Movistar Team	37	104	+ 3h 19' 22"	
74	Imanol Erviti	Spain	Movistar Team	34	77	+ 2h 47' 46"	
75	Mikel Landa	Spain	Movistar Team	28	7	+ 7' 37"	
76	José Joaquín Rojas	Spain	Movistar Team	33	DNF-9	–	
77	Marc Soler ‡	Spain	Movistar Team	24	62	+ 2h 18' 51"	
78	Alejandro Valverde	Spain	Movistar Team	38	14	+ 27' 26"	
81	Richie Porte	Australia	BMC Racing Team	33	DNF-9	–	
82	Patrick Bevin	New Zealand	BMC Racing Team	27	DNF-14	–	
83	Damiano Caruso	Italy	BMC Racing Team	30	20	+ 42' 31"	
84	Simon Gerrans	Australia	BMC Racing Team	38	107	+ 3h 21' 37"	
85	Stefan Küng ‡	Switzerland	BMC Racing Team	24	53	+ 2h 07' 14"	
86	Michael Schär	Switzerland	BMC Racing Team	31	90	+ 3h 04' 14"	
87	Greg Van Avermaet	Belgium	BMC Racing Team	33	28	+ 1h 10' 14"	
88	Tejay van Garderen	United States	BMC Racing Team	29	32	+ 1h 23' 05"	
91	Daniel Martin	Ireland	UAE Team Emirates	31	8	+ 9' 05"	
92	Darwin Atapuma	Colombia	UAE Team Emirates	30	69	+ 2h 35' 47"	
93	Kristijan Đurasek	Croatia	UAE Team Emirates	30	40	+ 1h 48' 06"	
94	Roberto Ferrari	Italy	UAE Team Emirates	35	138	+ 4h 01' 34"	
95	Alexander Kristoff	Norway	UAE Team Emirates	31	114	+ 3h 33' 33"	
96	Marco Marcato	Italy	UAE Team Emirates	34	126	+ 3h 42' 54"	
97	Rory Sutherland	Australia	UAE Team Emirates	36	106	+ 3h 21' 22"	
98	Oliviero Troia ‡	Italy	UAE Team Emirates	23	133	+ 3h 57' 02"	
101	Julian Alaphilippe	France	Quick-Step Floors	26	33	+ 1h 28' 08"	
102	Tim Declercq	Belgium	Quick-Step Floors	29	DNF-16	–	
103	Fernando Gaviria ‡	Colombia	Quick-Step Floors	23	DNF-12	–	
104	Philippe Gilbert	Belgium	Quick-Step Floors	36	DNS-17	–	
105	Bob Jungels	Luxembourg	Quick-Step Floors	25	11	+ 16' 32"	
106	Yves Lampaert	Belgium	Quick-Step Floors	27	80	+ 2h 52' 37"	
107	Maximiliano Richeze	Argentina	Quick-Step Floors	35	135	+ 3h 58' 58"	
108	Niki Terpstra	Netherlands	Quick-Step Floors	34	119	+ 3h 37' 31"	
111	Peter Sagan	Slovakia	Bora–Hansgrohe	28	71	+ 2h 38' 08"	
112	Maciej Bodnar	Poland	Bora–Hansgrohe	33	122	+ 3h 39' 20"	
113	Marcus Burghardt	Germany	Bora–Hansgrohe	35	92	+ 3h 04' 48"	
114	Rafał Majka	Poland	Bora–Hansgrohe	28	19	+ 39' 57"	
115	Gregor Mühlberger ‡	Austria	Bora–Hansgrohe	24	76	+ 2h 46' 13"	
116	Daniel Oss	Italy	Bora–Hansgrohe	31	112	+ 3h 32' 29"	
117	Paweł Poljański	Poland	Bora–Hansgrohe	28	94	+ 3h 46' 13"	
118	Lukas Pöstlberger	Austria	Bora–Hansgrohe	26	132	+ 3h 56' 53"	
121	Jakob Fuglsang	Denmark	Astana	33	12	+ 19' 46"	
122	Omar Fraile	Spain	Astana	27	57	+ 2h 10' 59"	
123	Dmitriy Gruzdev	Kazakhstan	Astana	32	HD-12	–	
124	Jesper Hansen	Denmark	Astana	27	56	+ 2h 10' 33"	
125	Tanel Kangert	Estonia	Astana	31	16	+ 34' 52"	
126	Magnus Cort Nielsen ‡	Denmark	Astana	25	68	+ 2h 32' 26"	
127	Luis León Sánchez	Spain	Astana	34	DNF-2	–	
128	Michael Valgren	Denmark	Astana	26	44	+ 1h 59' 20"	
131	Mark Cavendish	Great Britain	Team Dimension Data	33	HD-11	–	
132	Edvald Boasson Hagen	Norway	Team Dimension Data	31	84	+ 2h 57' 00"	
133	Reinardt Janse Van Rensburg	South Africa	Team Dimension Data	29	110	+ 3h 24' 25"	
134	Serge Pauwels	Belgium	Team Dimension Data	34	DNS-16	–	
135	Mark Renshaw	Australia	Team Dimension Data	35	HD-11	–	
136	Tom-Jelte Slagter	Netherlands	Team Dimension Data	29	59	+ 2h 13' 58"	
137	Jay Thomson	South Africa	Team Dimension Data	32	143	+ 4h 09' 49"	
138	Julien Vermote	Belgium	Team Dimension Data	28	75	+ 2h 45' 57"	
141	Ilnur Zakarin	Russia	Team Katusha–Alpecin	28	9	+ 12' 37"	
142	Ian Boswell	United States	Team Katusha–Alpecin	27	79	+ 2h 51' 47"	
143	Robert Kišerlovski	Croatia	Team Katusha–Alpecin	31	DNF-5	–	
144	Marcel Kittel	Germany	Team Katusha–Alpecin	30	HD-11	–	
145	Pavel Kochetkov	Russia	Team Katusha–Alpecin	32	61	+ 2h 17' 52"	
146	Tony Martin	Germany	Team Katusha–Alpecin	33	DNS-9	–	
147	Nils Politt ‡	Germany	Team Katusha–Alpecin	24	87	+ 3h 00' 54"	
148	Rick Zabel ‡	Germany	Team Katusha–Alpecin	24	DNF-12	–	
151	Arnaud Démare	France	Groupama–FDJ	26	141	+ 4h 08' 18"	
152	David Gaudu ‡	France	Groupama–FDJ	21	34	+ 1h 30' 01"	
153	Jacopo Guarnieri	Italy	Groupama–FDJ	30	144	+ 4h 12' 29"	
154	Olivier Le Gac ‡	France	Groupama–FDJ	24	127	+ 3h 49' 03"	
155	Tobias Ludvigsson	Sweden	Groupama–FDJ	27	74	+ 2h 45' 40"	
156	Rudy Molard	France	Groupama–FDJ	28	38	+ 1h 47' 36"	
157	Ramon Sinkeldam	Netherlands	Groupama–FDJ	29	134	+ 3h 58' 01"	
158	Arthur Vichot	France	Groupama–FDJ	29	41	+ 1h 51' 19"	
161	Steven Kruijswijk	Netherlands	LottoNL–Jumbo	31	5	+ 6' 08"	
162	Robert Gesink	Netherlands	LottoNL–Jumbo	32	31	+ 1h 21' 13"	
163	Dylan Groenewegen ‡	Netherlands	LottoNL–Jumbo	25	DNF-12	–	
164	Amund Grøndahl Jansen ‡	Norway	LottoNL–Jumbo	24	139	+ 4h 02' 04"	
165	Paul Martens	Germany	LottoNL–Jumbo	34	81	+ 2h 52' 46"	
166	Primož Roglič	Slovenia	LottoNL–Jumbo	28	4	+ 3' 22"	
167	Timo Roosen ‡	Netherlands	LottoNL–Jumbo	25	137	+ 4h 01' 05"	
168	Antwan Tolhoek ‡	Netherlands	LottoNL–Jumbo	24	37	+ 1h 39' 01"	
171	André Greipel	Germany	Lotto–Soudal	35	DNF-12	–	
172	Tiesj Benoot ‡	Belgium	Lotto–Soudal	24	DNS-5	–	
173	Jasper De Buyst ‡	Belgium	Lotto–Soudal	24	142	+ 4h 08' 54"	
174	Thomas De Gendt	Belgium	Lotto–Soudal	31	65	+ 2h 24' 41"	
175	Jens Keukeleire	Belgium	Lotto–Soudal	29	DNS-10	–	
176	Tomasz Marczyński	Poland	Lotto–Soudal	34	103	+ 3h 19' 10"	
177	Marcel Sieberg	Germany	Lotto–Soudal	36	DNF-12	–	
178	Jelle Vanendert	Belgium	Lotto–Soudal	33	DNF-19	–	
181	Lilian Calmejane	France	Direct Énergie	25	30	+ 1h 18' 09"	
182	Thomas Boudat ‡	France	Direct Énergie	24	89	+ 3h 04' 07"	
183	Sylvain Chavanel	France	Direct Énergie	39	39	+ 1h 47' 47"	
184	Jérôme Cousin	France	Direct Énergie	29	93	+ 3h 05' 34"	
185	Damien Gaudin	France	Direct Énergie	31	140	+ 4h 02' 07"	
186	Fabien Grellier ‡	France	Direct Énergie	23	120	+ 3h 37' 56"	
187	Romain Sicard	France	Direct Énergie	30	73	+ 2h 42' 53"	
188	Rein Taaramäe	Estonia	Direct Énergie	31	HD-12	–	
191	Bauke Mollema	Netherlands	Trek–Segafredo	31	26	+ 1h 06' 33"	
192	Julien Bernard	France	Trek–Segafredo	26	35	+ 1h 34' 12"	
193	Koen de Kort	Netherlands	Trek–Segafredo	35	78	+ 2h 48' 29"	
194	John Degenkolb	Germany	Trek–Segafredo	29	111	+ 3h 26' 35"	
195	Michael Gogl ‡	Austria	Trek–Segafredo	24	113	+ 3h 52' 54"	
196	Tsgabu Grmay	Ethiopia	Trek–Segafredo	26	DNF-2	–	
197	Toms Skujiņš	Latvia	Trek–Segafredo	27	82	+ 2h 53' 41"	
198	Jasper Stuyven	Belgium	Trek–Segafredo	26	63	+ 2h 20' 24"	
201	Christophe Laporte	France	Cofidis	25	124	+ 3h 41' 55"	
202	Dimitri Claeys	Belgium	Cofidis	31	130	+ 3h 51' 15"	
203	Nicolas Edet	France	Cofidis	30	43	+ 1h 58' 54"	
204	Jesús Herrada	Spain	Cofidis	27	47	+ 2h 05' 38"	
205	Daniel Navarro	Spain	Cofidis	34	45	+ 2h 01' 52"	
206	Anthony Perez	France	Cofidis	27	85	+ 2h 58' 56"	
207	Julien Simon	France	Cofidis	32	101	+ 3h 15' 55"	
208	Anthony Turgis ‡	France	Cofidis	24	116	+ 3h 36' 11"	
211	Guillaume Martin ‡	France	Wanty–Groupe Gobert	25	21	+ 44' 18"	
212	Thomas Degand	Belgium	Wanty–Groupe Gobert	32	54	+ 2h 09' 54"	
213	Timothy Dupont	Belgium	Wanty–Groupe Gobert	30	131	+ 3h 51' 16"	
214	Marco Minnaard	Netherlands	Wanty–Groupe Gobert	29	64	+ 2h 20' 31"	
215	Yoann Offredo	France	Wanty–Groupe Gobert	31	91	+ 3h 04' 27"	
216	Andrea Pasqualon	Italy	Wanty–Groupe Gobert	30	95	+ 3h 09' 34"	
217	Dion Smith ‡	New Zealand	Wanty–Groupe Gobert	25	97	+ 3h 12' 24"	
218	Guillaume Van Keirsbulck	Belgium	Wanty–Groupe Gobert	27	123	+ 3h 40' 30"	

=== By team ===
Team Sky (SKY)
No.	Rider	Pos.
1	Chris Froome (GBR)	3
2	Egan Bernal (COL)	15
3	Jonathan Castroviejo (ESP)	70
4	Michał Kwiatkowski (POL)	49
5	Gianni Moscon (ITA)	DSQ-15
6	Wout Poels (NED)	58
7	Luke Rowe (GBR)	128
8	Geraint Thomas (GBR)	1
Directeur sportif: Nicolas Portal/Servais Knaven

EF Education First–Drapac p/b Cannondale (CDT)
No.	Rider	Pos.
11	Rigoberto Urán (COL)	DNS-12
12	Simon Clarke (AUS)	100
13	Lawson Craddock (USA)	145
14	Daniel Martínez (COL)	36
15	Taylor Phinney (USA)	136
16	Pierre Rolland (FRA)	27
17	Thomas Scully (NZL)	129
18	Sep Vanmarcke (BEL)	115
Directeur sportif: Charly Wegelius/Andreas Klier

AG2R La Mondiale (ALM)
No.	Rider	Pos.
21	Romain Bardet (FRA)	6
22	Silvan Dillier (SUI)	83
23	Axel Domont (FRA)	DNF-4
24	Mathias Frank (SUI)	55
25	Tony Gallopin (FRA)	DNF-12
26	Pierre Latour (FRA)	13
27	Oliver Naesen (BEL)	66
28	Alexis Vuillermoz (FRA)	DNS-10
Directeur sportif: Julien Jurdie/Didier Jannel

Team Sunweb (SUN)
No.	Rider	Pos.
31	Michael Matthews (AUS)	DNS-5
32	Tom Dumoulin (NED)	2
33	Nikias Arndt (GER)	67
34	Simon Geschke (GER)	25
35	Chad Haga (USA)	72
36	Søren Kragh Andersen (DEN)	52
37	Laurens Ten Dam (NED)	51
38	Edward Theuns (BEL)	88
Directeur sportif: Luke Roberts/Tom Veelers

Fortuneo–Samsic (TFO)
No.	Rider	Pos.
41	Warren Barguil (FRA)	17
42	Maxime Bouet (FRA)	42
43	Elie Gesbert (FRA)	86
44	Romain Hardy (FRA)	105
45	Kevin Ledanois (FRA)	96
46	Amaël Moinard (FRA)	48
47	Laurent Pichon (FRA)	98
48	Florian Vachon (FRA)	99
Directeur sportif: Sébastien Hinault/Yvon Caer

Bahrain–Merida (TBM)
No.	Rider	Pos.
51	Vincenzo Nibali (ITA)	DNS-13
52	Sonny Colbrelli (ITA)	109
53	Heinrich Haussler (AUS)	125
54	Gorka Izagirre (ESP)	24
55	Ion Izagirre (ESP)	22
56	Kristijan Koren (SLO)	12
57	Franco Pellizotti (ITA)	60
58	Domenico Pozzovivo (ITA)	18
Directeur sportif: Gorazd Štangelj/Rik Verbrugghe

Mitchelton–Scott (ORS)
No.	Rider	Pos.
61	Adam Yates (GBR)	29
62	Jack Bauer (NZL)	121
63	Luke Durbridge (AUS)	118
64	Mathew Hayman (AUS)	108
65	Michael Hepburn (AUS)	117
66	Damien Howson (AUS)	DNS-16
67	Daryl Impey (RSA)	46
68	Mikel Nieve (ESP)	23
Directeur sportif: Matthew White/Laurenzo Lapage

Movistar Team (MOV)
No.	Rider	Pos.
71	Nairo Quintana (COL)	10
72	Andrey Amador (CRI)	50
73	Daniele Bennati (ITA)	104
74	Imanol Erviti (ESP)	77
75	Mikel Landa (ESP)	7
76	José Joaquín Rojas (ESP)	DNF-9
77	Marc Soler (ESP)	62
78	Alejandro Valverde (ESP)	14
Directeur sportif: José Luis Arrieta/José Vicente García

BMC Racing Team (BMC)
No.	Rider	Pos.
81	Richie Porte (AUS)	DNF-9
82	Patrick Bevin (NZL)	DNF-14
83	Damiano Caruso (ITA)	20
84	Simon Gerrans (AUS)	107
85	Stefan Küng (SUI)	53
86	Michael Schar (SUI)	90
87	Greg Van Avermaet (BEL)	28
88	Tejay van Garderen (USA)	32
Directeur sportif: Fabio Baldato/Valerio Piva

UAE Team Emirates (UAD)
No.	Rider	Pos.
91	Daniel Martin (IRL)	8
92	John Darwin Atapuma (COL)	69
93	Kristijan Đurasek (CRO)	40
94	Roberto Ferrari (ITA)	138
95	Alexander Kristoff (NOR)	114
96	Marco Marcato (ITA)	126
97	Rory Sutherland (AUS)	106
98	Oliviero Troia (ITA)	133
Directeur sportif: Philippe Mauduit/Simone Pedrazzini

Quick-Step Floors (QST)
No.	Rider	Pos.
101	Julian Alaphilippe (FRA)	33
102	Tim Declercq (BEL)	DNF-16
103	Fernando Gaviria (COL)	DNF-12
104	Philippe Gilbert (BEL)	DNS-17
105	Bob Jungels (LUX)	11
106	Yves Lampaert (BEL)	80
107	Ariel Maximiliano Richeze (ARG)	135
108	Niki Terpstra (NED)	119
Directeur sportif: Tom Steels/Davide Bramati

Bora–Hansgrohe (BOH)
No.	Rider	Pos.
111	Peter Sagan (SVK)	71
112	Maciej Bodnar (POL)	122
113	Marcus Burghardt (GER)	92
114	Rafał Majka (POL)	19
115	Gregor Mühlberger (AUT)	76
116	Daniel Oss (ITA)	112
117	Paweł Poljański (POL)	94
118	Lukas Pöstlberger (AUT)	132
Directeur sportif: Enrico Poitschke/Ján Valach

Astana (AST)
No.	Rider	Pos.
121	Jakob Fuglsang (DEN)	12
122	Omar Fraile (ESP)	57
123	Dmitriy Gruzdev (KAZ)	HD-12
124	Jesper Hansen (DEN)	56
125	Tanel Kangert (EST)	16
126	Magnus Cort Nielsen (DEN)	68
127	Luis León Sánchez (ESP)	DNF-2
128	Michael Valgren (DEN)	44
Directeur sportif: Dmitry Fofonov/Bruno Cenghialta

Team Dimension Data (DDD)
No.	Rider	Pos.
131	Mark Cavendish (GBR)	HD-11
132	Edvald Boasson Hagen (NOR)	84
133	Reinardt Janse van Rensburg (RSA)	110
134	Serge Pauwels (BEL)	DNS-16
135	Mark Renshaw (AUS)	HD-11
136	Tom-Jelte Slagter (NED)	59
137	Jay Robert Thomson (RSA)	143
138	Julien Vermote (BEL)	75
Directeur sportif: Roger Hammond/Jean-Pierre Heynderickx

Team Katusha–Alpecin (KAT)
No.	Rider	Pos.
141	Ilnur Zakarin (RUS)	9
142	Ian Boswell (USA)	79
143	Robert Kišerlovski (CRO)	DNF-5
144	Marcel Kittel (GER)	HD-11
145	Pavel Kochetkov (RUS)	61
146	Tony Martin (GER)	DNS-9
147	Nils Politt (GER)	87
148	Rick Zabel (GER)	DNF-12
Directeur sportif: Dimitri Konyshev/Torsten Schmidt

Groupama–FDJ (FDJ)
No.	Rider	Pos.
151	Arnaud Démare (FRA)	141
152	David Gaudu (FRA)	34
153	Jacopo Guarnieri (ITA)	144
154	Olivier Le Gac (FRA)	127
155	Tobias Ludvigsson (SWE)	74
156	Rudy Molard (FRA)	38
157	Ramon Sinkeldam (NED)	134
158	Arthur Vichot (FRA)	41
Directeur sportif: Thierry Bricaud/Frédéric Guesdon

LottoNL–Jumbo (TLJ)
No.	Rider	Pos.
161	Steven Kruijswijk (NED)	5
162	Robert Gesink (NED)	31
163	Dylan Groenewegen (NED)	DNF-12
164	Amund Grøndahl Jansen (NOR)	139
165	Paul Martens (GER)	81
166	Primož Roglič (SLO)	4
167	Timo Roosen (NED)	137
168	Antwan Tolhoek (NED)	37
Directeur sportif: Nico Verhoeven/Frans Maassen

Lotto–Soudal (LTS)
No.	Rider	Pos.
171	André Greipel (GER)	DNF-12
172	Tiesj Benoot (BEL)	DNS-5
173	Jasper De Buyst (BEL)	142
174	Thomas De Gendt (BEL)	65
175	Jens Keukeleire (BEL)	DNS-10
176	Tomasz Marczyński (POL)	103
177	Marcel Sieberg (GER)	DNF-12
178	Jelle Vanendert (BEL)	DNF-19
Directeur sportif: Herman Frison/Frederik Willems

Direct Énergie (DEN)
No.	Rider	Pos.
181	Lilian Calmejane (FRA)	30
182	Thomas Boudat (FRA)	89
183	Sylvain Chavanel (FRA)	39
184	Jérôme Cousin (FRA)	93
185	Damien Gaudin (FRA)	140
186	Fabien Grellier (FRA)	120
187	Romain Sicard (FRA)	73
188	Rein Taaramäe (EST)	HD-12
Directeur sportif: Benoit Genauzeau/Dominique Arnould

Trek–Segafredo (TFS)
No.	Rider	Pos.
191	Bauke Mollema (NED)	26
192	Julien Bernard (FRA)	35
193	Koen de Kort (NED)	78
194	John Degenkolb (GER)	111
195	Michael Gogl (AUT)	113
196	Tsgabu Grmay (ETH)	DNF-2
197	Toms Skujiņš (LAT)	82
198	Jasper Stuyven (BEL)	63
Directeur sportif: Kim Andersen/Steven de Jongh

Cofidis (COF)
No.	Rider	Pos.
201	Christophe Laporte (FRA)	124
202	Dimitri Claeys (BEL)	130
203	Nicolas Edet (FRA)	43
204	Jesús Herrada (ESP)	47
205	Daniel Navarro (ESP)	45
206	Anthony Perez (FRA)	85
207	Julien Simon (FRA)	101
208	Anthony Turgis (FRA)	116
Directeur sportif: Roberto Damiani/Christian Guiberteau

Wanty–Groupe Gobert (WGG)
No.	Rider	Pos.
211	Guillaume Martin (FRA)	21
212	Thomas Degand (BEL)	54
213	Timothy Dupont (BEL)	131
214	Marco Minnaard (NED)	64
215	Yoann Offredo (FRA)	91
216	Andrea Pasqualon (ITA)	95
217	Dion Smith (NZL)	97
218	Guillaume Van Keirsbulck (BEL)	123
Directeur sportif: Hilaire Van der Schueren/Steven de Neef

=== By nationality ===
The 176 riders that are competing in the 2018 Tour de France originated from 30 different countries.

Country	No. of riders	Finishers	Stage wins
Argentina	1	1	
Australia	11	7	
Austria	3	3	
Belgium	19	13	
Colombia	6	4	3 (Fernando Gaviria x2, Nairo Quintana)
Costa Rica	1	1	
Croatia	2	1	
Denmark	5	5	1 (Magnus Cort)
Estonia	2	1	
Ethiopia	1	0	
France	35	32	3 (Julian Alaphilippe x2, Arnaud Démare)
Germany	11	6	1 (John Degenkolb)
Great Britain	5	4	2 (Geraint Thomas x2)
Ireland	1	1	1 (Dan Martin)
Italy	13	11	
Kazakhstan	1	0	
Latvia	1	1	
Luxembourg	1	1	
Netherlands	14	13	3 (Dylan Groenewegen x2, Tom Dumoulin)
New Zealand	4	3	
Norway	3	3	1 (Alexander Kristoff)
Poland	5	5	
Russia	2	2	
Slovakia	1	1	3 (Peter Sagan x3)
Slovenia	2	2	1 (Primož Roglič)
South Africa	3	3	
Spain	13	11	1 (Omar Fraile)
Sweden	1	1	
Switzerland	4	4	
United States	5	5	
Total	176	145	20
