= 2018 Tour de France, Stage 1 to Stage 11 =

Stage of cycling race

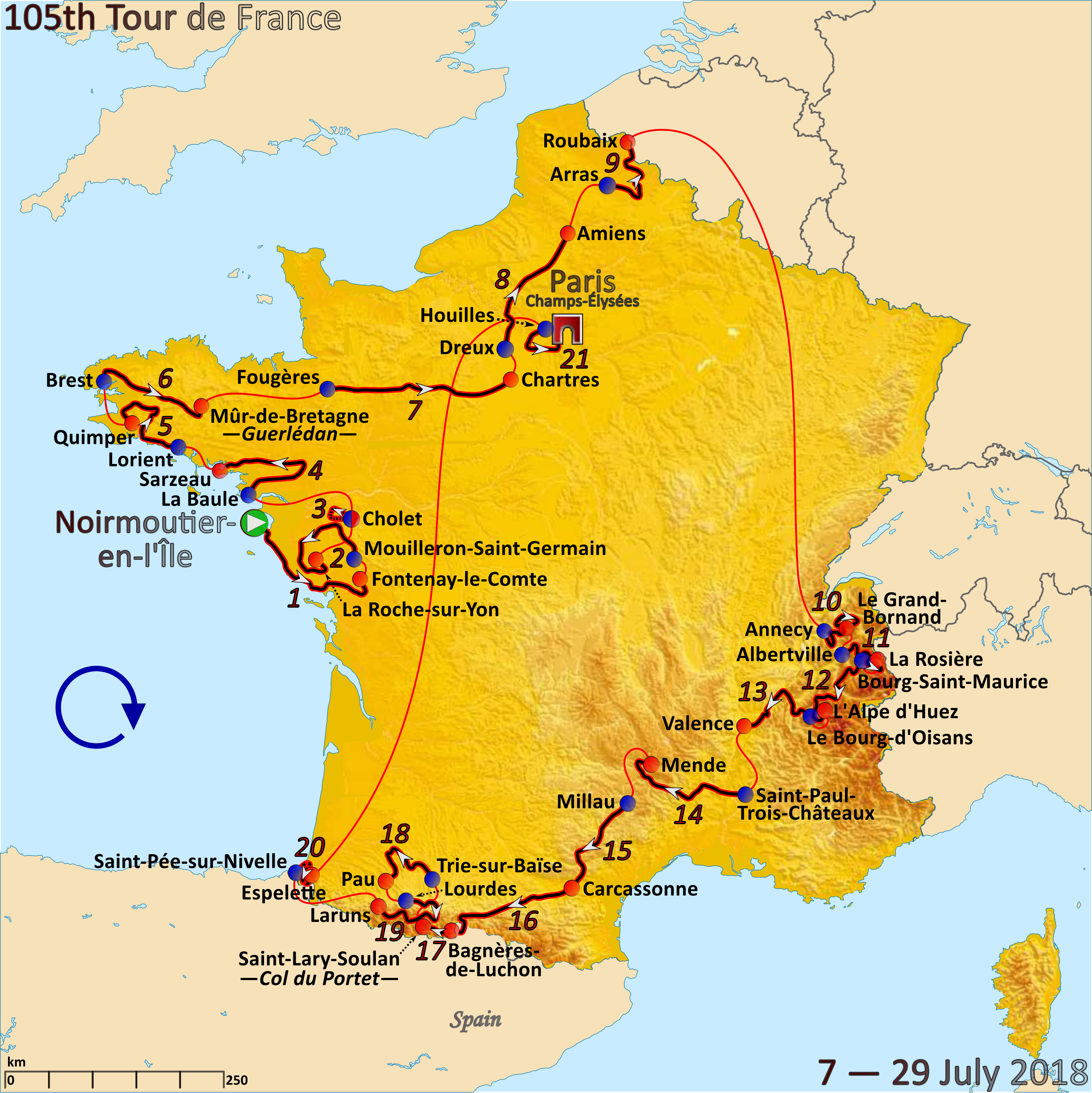
Route of the 2018 Tour de France

The 2018 Tour de France was the 105th edition of Tour de France, one of cycling's Grand Tours. The Tour began in Noirmoutier-en-l'Île with a flat stage on 7 July, and Stage 11 occurred on 18 July with a mountainous stage to La Rosière. The race finished on the Champs-Élysées in Paris on 29 July.

== Classification standings ==
Legend
A yellow jersey.	Denotes the leader of the general classification	A white jersey with red polka dots.	Denotes the leader of the mountains classification
A green jersey.	Denotes the leader of the points classification	A white jersey.	Denotes the leader of the young rider classification
A white jersey with a yellow number bib.	Denotes the leader of the team classification	A white jersey with a red number bib.	Denotes the winner of the combativity award

== Stage 1 ==
7 July 2018 – Noirmoutier-en-l'Île to Fontenay-le-Comte, 201 km (124.9 mi)

The race departed from Noirmoutier-en-l'Île heading south, following the coast to Les Sables-d'Olonne. The route then turned southeast with an intermediate sprint at La Tranche-sur-Mer. Continuing east, the race passed through Chaillé-les-Marais before the category 4 climb of the Côte de Vix and a bonification point at Maillezais. The race then turned north to the flat finish at Fontenay-le-Comte.

Several crashes in the final 20 km (12 mi) resulted in general classification contenders Chris Froome, Adam Yates and Richie Porte all losing 51 seconds. Meanwhile, Nairo Quintana suffered a puncture and lost over a minute on the general classification.

Stage 1 result
Rank	Rider	Team	Time
1	Fernando Gaviria (COL)	Quick-Step Floors	4h 23' 32"
2	Peter Sagan (SVK)	Bora–Hansgrohe	+ 0"
3	Marcel Kittel (GER)	Team Katusha–Alpecin	+ 0"
4	Alexander Kristoff (NOR)	UAE Team Emirates	+ 0"
5	Christophe Laporte (FRA)	Cofidis	+ 0"
6	Dylan Groenewegen (NED)	LottoNL–Jumbo	+ 0"
7	Michael Matthews (AUS)	Team Sunweb	+ 0"
8	John Degenkolb (GER)	Trek–Segafredo	+ 0"
9	Jakob Fuglsang (DEN)	Astana	+ 0"
10	Rafał Majka (POL)	Bora–Hansgrohe	+ 0"

General classification after Stage 1 (Note: The time difference, between the stage result and the general classification, is explained by time bonuses given at the bonification point or the stage finish.)
Rank	Rider	Team	Time
1	Fernando Gaviria (COL)	Quick-Step Floors	4h 23' 22"
2	Peter Sagan (SVK)	Bora–Hansgrohe	+ 4"
3	Marcel Kittel (GER)	Team Katusha–Alpecin	+ 6"
4	Oliver Naesen (BEL)	AG2R La Mondiale	+ 9"
5	Alexander Kristoff (NOR)	UAE Team Emirates	+ 10"
6	Christophe Laporte (FRA)	Cofidis	+ 10"
7	Dylan Groenewegen (NED)	LottoNL–Jumbo	+ 10"
8	Michael Matthews (AUS)	Team Sunweb	+ 10"
9	John Degenkolb (GER)	Trek–Segafredo	+ 10"
10	Jakob Fuglsang (DEN)	Astana	+ 10"

== Stage 2 ==
8 July 2018 – Mouilleron-Saint-Germain to La Roche-sur-Yon, 183 km (113.7 mi)

The stage departed from Mouilleron-Saint-Germain heading east. The riders turned northeast at La Châtaigneraie, west at Saint-Pierre-du-Chemin and then north at Réaumur. The race then headed over the category 4 Côte de Pouzauges and continued northwest through Les Herbiers to Tiffauges. The race turned west to Montaigu and then southwest through Boufféré and Les Lucs-sur-Boulogne to Palluau. The riders then continued south through Aizenay to an intermediate sprint at Beaulieu-sous-la-Roche and then southeast to Nieul-le-Dolent. The route then turned east to a bonification point at Saint-Florent-des-Bois, and northwest to the finish line at La Roche-sur-Yon.

Sylvain Chavanel went ahead of the peloton from the start of the stage, gaining a temporary lead of four and a half minutes, eventually being caught 13 km (8.1 mi) from the finish. Tsgabu Grmay became the first retirement of the Tour, abandoning 90 km (56 mi) from the stage finish. Adam Yates recovered from a crash 30 km (19 mi) from the finish. Fernando Gaviria, the yellow jersey holder, crashed on a sharp right-hand bend in the last 2 km (1.2 mi) of the stage, allowing Sagan to take the lead.

Stage 2 result
Rank	Rider	Team	Time
1	Peter Sagan (SVK)	Bora–Hansgrohe	4h 06' 37"
2	Sonny Colbrelli (ITA)	Bahrain–Merida	+ 0"
3	Arnaud Démare (FRA)	Groupama–FDJ	+ 0"
4	André Greipel (GER)	Lotto–Soudal	+ 0"
5	Alexander Kristoff (NOR)	UAE Team Emirates	+ 0"
6	Timothy Dupont (BEL)	Wanty–Groupe Gobert	+ 0"
7	Alejandro Valverde (SPA)	Movistar Team	+ 0"
8	Andrea Pasqualon (ITA)	Wanty–Groupe Gobert	+ 0"
9	John Degenkolb (GER)	Trek–Segafredo	+ 0"
10	Philippe Gilbert (BEL)	Quick-Step Floors	+ 0"

General classification after Stage 2
Rank	Rider	Team	Time
1	Peter Sagan (SVK)	Bora–Hansgrohe	8h 29' 53"
2	Fernando Gaviria (COL)	Quick-Step Floors	+ 6"
3	Sonny Colbrelli (ITA)	Bahrain–Merida	+ 10"
4	Sylvain Chavanel (FRA)	Direct Énergie	+ 13"
5	Philippe Gilbert (BEL)	Quick-Step Floors	+ 14"
6	Geraint Thomas (GBR)	Team Sky	+ 15"
7	Oliver Naesen (BEL)	AG2R La Mondiale	+ 15"
8	Alexander Kristoff (NOR)	UAE Team Emirates	+ 16"
9	John Degenkolb (GER)	Trek–Segafredo	+ 16"
10	Timothy Dupont (BEL)	Wanty–Groupe Gobert	+ 16"

== Stage 3 ==
9 July 2018 – Cholet to Cholet, 35 km (22 mi) (TTT)

For the team time trial, the teams departed from Cholet heading north to Saint-Léger-sous-Cholet. The riders then turned west to the first timecheck at the village of Saint-André-de-la-Marche, in Sèvremoine, and turned south. From La Romagne the route turned east, with the second timecheck at La Séguinière. The teams then headed back to the finish line in Cholet. The route was expected to take each team about 39 minutes.

Stage 3 result
Rank	Team	Time
1	BMC Racing Team	38' 46"
2	Team Sky	+ 4"
3	Quick-Step Floors	+ 7"
4	Mitchelton–Scott	+ 9"
5	Team Sunweb	+ 11"
6	EF Education First–Drapac	+ 35"
7	Bora–Hansgrohe	+ 50"
8	Astana	+ 51"
9	Team Katusha–Alpecin	+ 52"
10	Movistar Team	+ 53"

General classification after stage 3
Rank	Rider	Team	Time
1	Greg Van Avermaet (BEL)	BMC Racing Team	9h 08' 55"
2	Tejay van Garderen (USA)	BMC Racing Team	+ 0"
3	Geraint Thomas (GBR)	Team Sky	+ 3"
4	Philippe Gilbert (BEL)	Quick-Step Floors	+ 5"
5	Bob Jungels (LUX)	Quick-Step Floors	+ 7"
6	Julian Alaphilippe (FRA)	Quick-Step Floors	+ 7"
7	Tom Dumoulin (NED)	Team Sunweb	+ 11"
8	Søren Kragh Andersen (DEN)	Team Sunweb	+ 11"
9	Michael Matthews (AUS)	Team Sunweb	+ 11"
10	Rigoberto Urán (COL)	EF Education First–Drapac	+ 35"

== Stage 4 ==
10 July 2018 – La Baule to Sarzeau, 195 km (121 mi)

The riders departed west and then northeast from La Baule, with racing beginning just before Guérande. The race continued northeast to La Chapelle-des-Marais and then east through Pontchâteau to Blain. After heading northeast to Nozay, the race turned north to an intermediate sprint at Derval. The route then turned west, heading through Guémené-Penfao and Redon to the category 4 climb of the Côte de Saint-Jean-la-Poterie. The riders then continued through Allaire, to a bonification point at Limerzel, and turned southwest to Muzillac. The race then headed west to the slight uphill finish at Sarzeau.

From the start of racing, Dimitri Claeys, Anthony Perez, Jérôme Cousin and Guillaume Van Keirsbulck broke away from the peloton, building a temporary lead of approximately eight minutes. At 5 km (3.1 mi) before the finish, a crash caused Rigoberto Urán and Ilnur Zakarin to lose contact with the peloton. Urán managed to chase back to the peloton before the finish, while Zakarin lost nearly a minute on the general classification. The participants in the original breakaway group were all eventually caught by the peloton, within the last 2 km (1.2 mi), allowing for a sprint finish.

Stage 4 result
Rank	Rider	Team	Time
1	Fernando Gaviria (COL)	Quick-Step Floors	4h 25' 01"
2	Peter Sagan (SVK)	Bora–Hansgrohe	+ 0"
3	André Greipel (GER)	Lotto–Soudal	+ 0"
4	Dylan Groenewegen (NED)	LottoNL–Jumbo	+ 0"
5	Marcel Kittel (GER)	Team Katusha–Alpecin	+ 0"
6	Andrea Pasqualon (ITA)	Wanty–Groupe Gobert	+ 0"
7	Alexander Kristoff (NOR)	UAE Team Emirates	+ 0"
8	John Degenkolb (GER)	Trek–Segafredo	+ 0"
9	Dion Smith (NZL)	Wanty–Groupe Gobert	+ 0"
10	Timothy Dupont (BEL)	Wanty–Groupe Gobert	+ 0"

General classification after Stage 4
Rank	Rider	Team	Time
1	Greg Van Avermaet (BEL)	BMC Racing Team	13h 33' 56"
2	Tejay van Garderen (USA)	BMC Racing Team	+ 0"
3	Geraint Thomas (GBR)	Team Sky	+ 3"
4	Philippe Gilbert (BEL)	Quick-Step Floors	+ 5"
5	Julian Alaphilippe (FRA)	Quick-Step Floors	+ 7"
6	Bob Jungels (LUX)	Quick-Step Floors	+ 7"
7	Tom Dumoulin (NED)	Team Sunweb	+ 11"
8	Søren Kragh Andersen (DEN)	Team Sunweb	+ 11"
9	Michael Matthews (AUS)	Team Sunweb	+ 11"
10	Rigoberto Urán (COL)	EF Education First–Drapac	+ 35"

== Stage 5 ==
11 July 2018 – Lorient to Quimper, 203 km (126 mi)

The riders departed west from Lorient, with racing beginning after passing through Ploemeur. The riders then headed northwest through Moëlan-sur-Mer, Pont-Aven and Trégunc. At Concarneau the route turned north to Saint-Yvi and then northeast to an intermediate sprint at Roudouallec. The route then meandered west over the category 4 climb of the Côte de Kaliforn and the category 4 Côte de Trimen. After continuing through Châteauneuf-du-Faou to the category 3 Côte de la Roche du Feu, the race headed through Châteaulin and over the category 3 Côte de Menez Quelerc'h. The riders then headed southwest to the category 3 Côte de la montagne de Locronan. Heading southeast, a bonification point occurred at the Côte de la chapelle de La Lorette, before the uphill finish in Quimper.

Stage 5 result
Rank	Rider	Team	Time
1	Peter Sagan (SVK)	Bora–Hansgrohe	4h 48' 06"
2	Sonny Colbrelli (ITA)	Bahrain–Merida	+ 0"
3	Philippe Gilbert (BEL)	Quick-Step Floors	+ 0"
4	Alejandro Valverde (SPA)	Movistar Team	+ 0"
5	Julian Alaphilippe (FRA)	Quick-Step Floors	+ 0"
6	Dan Martin (IRL)	UAE Team Emirates	+ 0"
7	Greg Van Avermaet (BEL)	BMC Racing Team	+ 0"
8	Søren Kragh Andersen (DEN)	Team Sunweb	+ 0"
9	Andrea Pasqualon (ITA)	Wanty–Groupe Gobert	+ 0"
10	Vincenzo Nibali (ITA)	Bahrain–Merida	+ 0"

General classification after Stage 5
Rank	Rider	Team	Time
1	Greg Van Avermaet (BEL)	BMC Racing Team	18h 22' 00"
2	Tejay van Garderen (USA)	BMC Racing Team	+ 2"
3	Philippe Gilbert (BEL)	Quick-Step Floors	+ 3"
4	Geraint Thomas (GBR)	Team Sky	+ 5"
5	Julian Alaphilippe (FRA)	Quick-Step Floors	+ 6"
6	Bob Jungels (LUX)	Quick-Step Floors	+ 9"
7	Tom Dumoulin (NED)	Team Sunweb	+ 13"
8	Søren Kragh Andersen (DEN)	Team Sunweb	+ 13"
9	Rigoberto Urán (COL)	EF Education First–Drapac	+ 37"
10	Rafał Majka (POL)	Bora–Hansgrohe	+ 52"

== Stage 6 ==
12 July 2018 – Brest to Mûr-de-Bretagne Guerlédan, 181 km (112 mi)

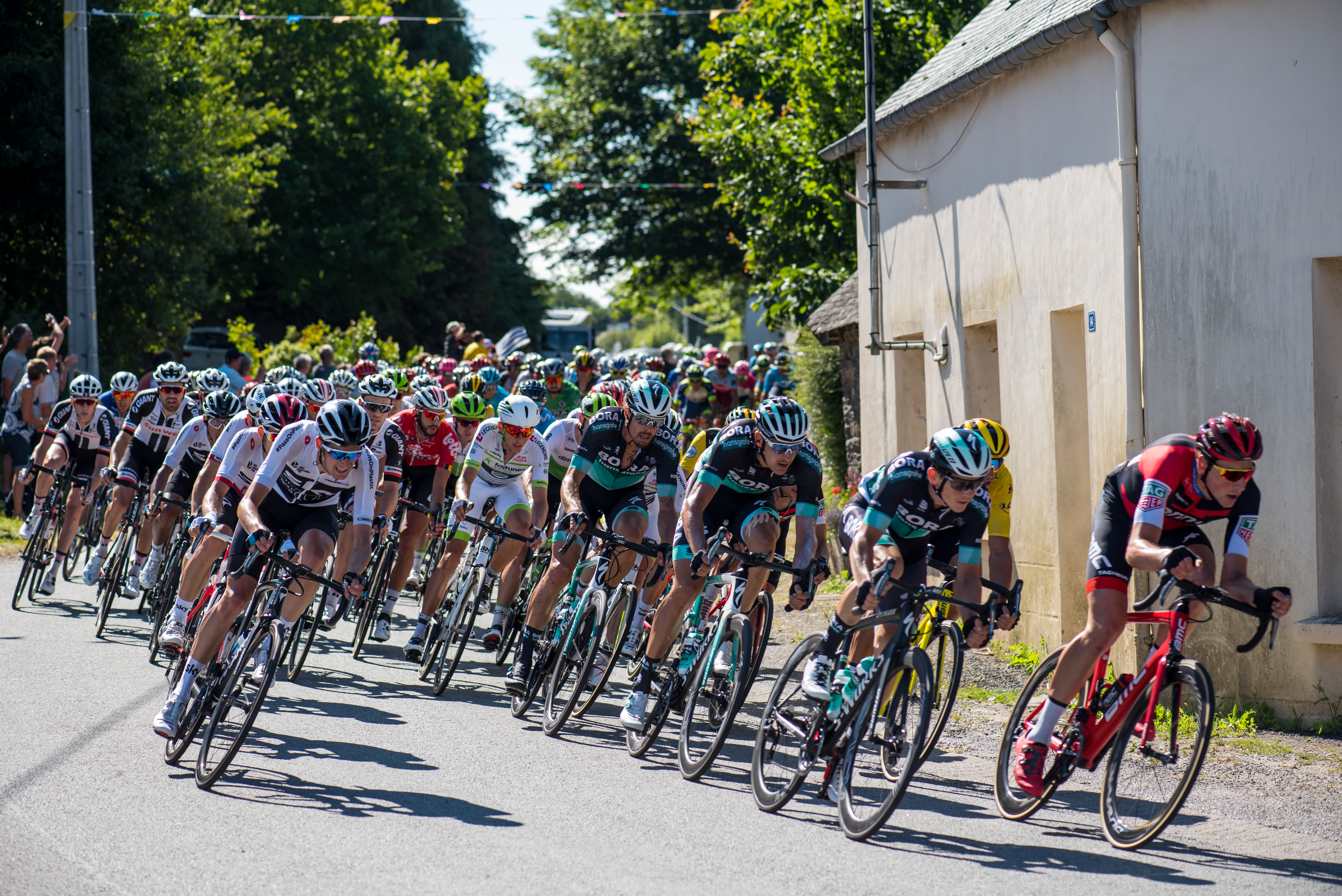
The peloton riding through Saint-Mayeux

The riders departed from Brest heading north to Bourg-Blanc and then northeast to Loc-Brévalaire. The route turned east at the D28 road, continuing southeast to the category 3 climb of the Côte de Ploudiry and then south to Sizun. Turning east, the race continued over the category 4 climb of the Côte de Roc'h Trévézel, through Huelgoat, Poullaouen, Carhaix-Plouguer, Maël-Carhaix and Rostrenen to an intermediate sprint at Plouguernével. The route continued east through Gouarec to Saint-Aignan, where the route turned north. The riders then climbed the 2 km (1.2 mi) category 3 Mûr-de-Bretagne Guerlédan, passing the finish line for the first time, before a bonification point at Saint-Mayeux. Turning southeast to Saint-Gilles-Vieux-Marché and then south, the riders then continued to the town of Mûr-de-Bretagne, before turning north for the second climb of the category 3 route to the finish line.

A leading group of five, including Damien Gaudin, Fabien Grellier, Laurent Pichon, Dion Smith and Anthony Turgis, went in front of the peloton from the beginning of racing. The group established a seven-minute lead at the Côte de Roc'h Trévézel. With 100 km (62 mi) remaining, the race was subjected to crosswinds, which reduced the leading group's advantage to less than three and a half minutes, and temporarily split the peloton. The leading group was caught before the first ascent of the Mûr-de-Bretagne. In the few kilometres after the first ascent, Jack Bauer launched a temporary attack off the front of the peloton. Tom Dumoulin punctured with 5.5 km (3.4 mi) remaining, and eventually lost nearly a minute to the other general classification contenders. On the second ascent of the Mûr-de-Bretagne, Richie Porte staged an initial attack. Dan Martin counter-attacked, and held the lead to the finish.

Stage 6 result
Rank	Rider	Team	Time
1	Dan Martin (IRL)	UAE Team Emirates	4h 13' 43"
2	Pierre Latour (FRA)	AG2R La Mondiale	+ 1"
3	Alejandro Valverde (ESP)	Movistar Team	+ 3"
4	Julian Alaphilippe (FRA)	Quick-Step Floors	+ 3"
5	Rafał Majka (POL)	Bora–Hansgrohe	+ 3"
6	Adam Yates (GBR)	Mitchelton–Scott	+ 3"
7	Bauke Mollema (NED)	Trek–Segafredo	+ 3"
8	Peter Sagan (SVK)	Bora–Hansgrohe	+ 3"
9	Geraint Thomas (GBR)	Team Sky	+ 3"
10	Primož Roglič (SLO)	LottoNL–Jumbo	+ 3"

General classification after Stage 6
Rank	Rider	Team	Time
1	Greg Van Avermaet (BEL)	BMC Racing Team	22h 35' 46"
2	Geraint Thomas (GBR)	Team Sky	+ 3"
3	Tejay van Garderen (USA)	BMC Racing Team	+ 5"
4	Julian Alaphilippe (FRA)	Quick-Step Floors	+ 6"
5	Philippe Gilbert (BEL)	Quick-Step Floors	+ 12"
6	Bob Jungels (LUX)	Quick-Step Floors	+ 18"
7	Rigoberto Urán (COL)	EF Education First–Drapac	+ 45"
8	Alejandro Valverde (ESP)	Movistar Team	+ 51"
9	Rafał Majka (POL)	Bora–Hansgrohe	+ 52"
10	Jakob Fuglsang (DEN)	Astana	+ 53"

== Stage 7 ==
13 July 2018 – Fougères to Chartres, 231 km (144 mi)

For the longest stage of the Tour, the race departed east from Fougères, passing through Mayenne and Alençon to the category 4 climb of the Côte du Buisson de Perseigne, just before Neufchâtel-en-Saosnois. The riders then travelled through Mamers and Bellême before an intermediate sprint at Berd'huis. The route then passed through Nogent-le-Rotrou, to a bonification point at Nonvilliers-Grandhoux, and then continued east to the finish line in Chartres.

Stage 7 result
Rank	Rider	Team	Time
1	Dylan Groenewegen (NED)	LottoNL–Jumbo	5h 43' 42"
2	Fernando Gaviria (COL)	Quick-Step Floors	+ 0"
3	Peter Sagan (SVK)	Bora–Hansgrohe	+ 0"
4	Arnaud Démare (FRA)	Groupama–FDJ	+ 0"
5	Christophe Laporte (FRA)	Cofidis	+ 0"
6	John Degenkolb (GER)	Trek–Segafredo	+ 0"
7	Daryl Impey (RSA)	Mitchelton–Scott	+ 0"
8	André Greipel (GER)	Lotto–Soudal	+ 0"
9	Andrea Pasqualon (ITA)	Wanty–Groupe Gobert	+ 0"
10	Mark Cavendish (GBR)	Team Dimension Data	+ 0"

General classification after Stage 7
Rank	Rider	Team	Time
1	Greg Van Avermaet (BEL)	BMC Racing Team	28h 19' 25"
2	Geraint Thomas (GBR)	Team Sky	+ 6"
3	Tejay van Garderen (USA)	BMC Racing Team	+ 8"
4	Julian Alaphilippe (FRA)	Quick-Step Floors	+ 9"
5	Philippe Gilbert (BEL)	Quick-Step Floors	+ 15"
6	Bob Jungels (LUX)	Quick-Step Floors	+ 21"
7	Rigoberto Urán (COL)	EF Education First–Drapac	+ 48"
8	Alejandro Valverde (ESP)	Movistar Team	+ 54"
9	Rafał Majka (POL)	Bora–Hansgrohe	+ 55"
10	Jakob Fuglsang (DEN)	Astana	+ 56"

== Stage 8 ==
14 July 2018 – Dreux to Amiens, 181 km (112 mi)

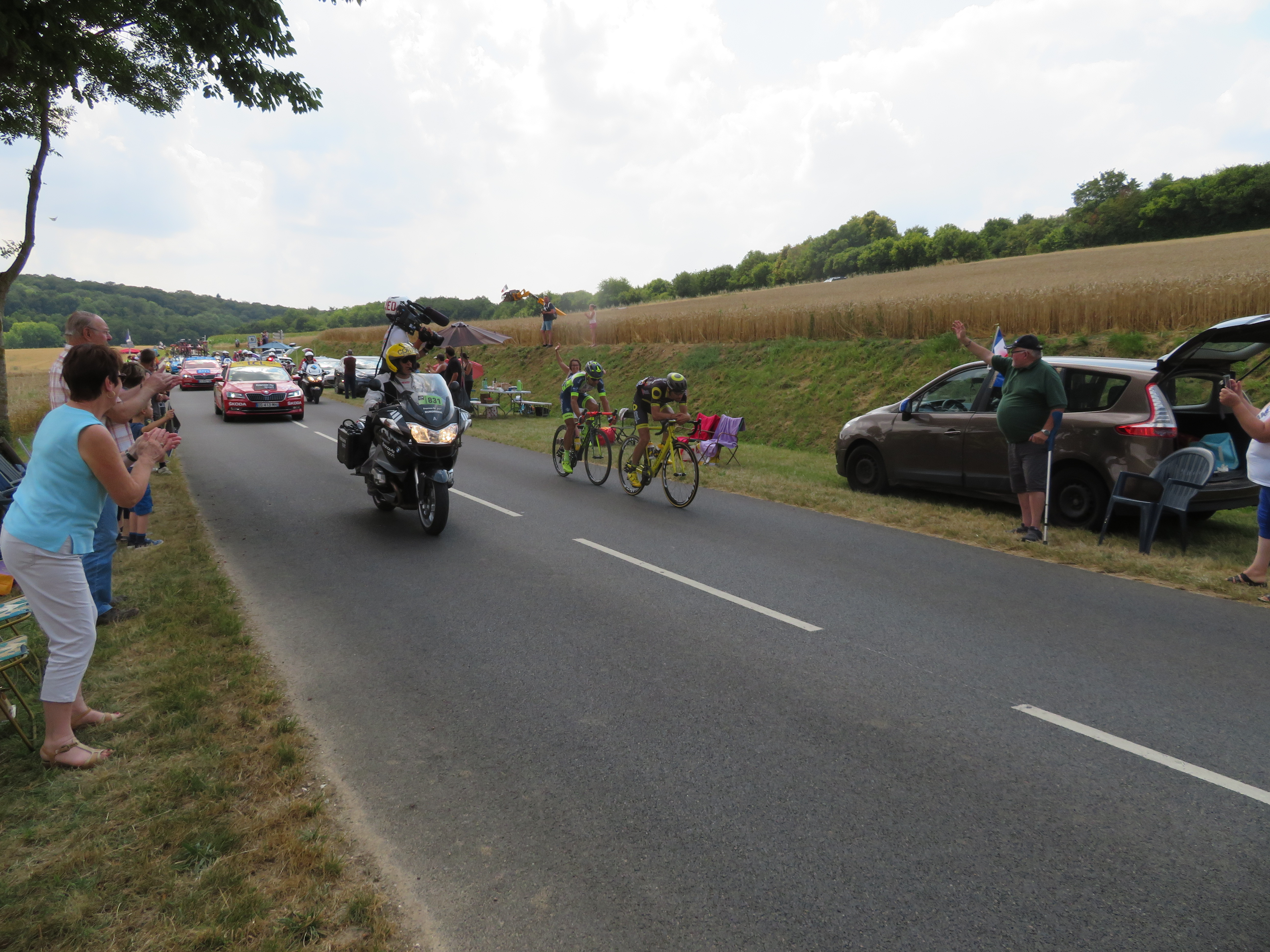
Fabien Grellier and Marco Minnaard, leading the stage at Le Gallet, just after Crèvecœur-le-Grand.

The stage departed north from Dreux, heading through Anet, to the category 4 climb of the Côte de Pacy-sur-Eure and northeast to Vernon. The race turned northwest and then north to Les Andelys, then northeast to the category 4 climb of the Côte de Feuquerolles. The riders then had an intermediate sprint at La Neuve-Grange, and continued through Gournay-en-Bray and Crèvecœur-le-Grand. A bonification point occurred at Loeuilly, before the flat finish in Amiens.

André Greipel and Fernando Gaviria initially finished second and third, respectively, but were both relegated due to an irregular sprint.

Stage 8 result
Rank	Rider	Team	Time
1	Dylan Groenewegen (NED)	LottoNL–Jumbo	4h 23' 36"
2	Peter Sagan (SVK)	Bora–Hansgrohe	+ 0"
3	John Degenkolb (GER)	Trek–Segafredo	+ 0"
4	Alexander Kristoff (NOR)	UAE Team Emirates	+ 0"
5	Arnaud Démare (FRA)	Groupama–FDJ	+ 0"
6	Thomas Boudat (FRA)	Direct Énergie	+ 0"
7	Nikias Arndt (GER)	Team Sunweb	+ 0"
8	Mark Cavendish (GBR)	Team Dimension Data	+ 0"
9	Yves Lampaert (BEL)	Quick-Step Floors	+ 0"
10	Andrea Pasqualon (ITA)	Wanty–Groupe Gobert	+ 0"

General classification after Stage 8
Rank	Rider	Team	Time
1	Greg Van Avermaet (BEL)	BMC Racing Team	32h 43' 00"
2	Geraint Thomas (GBR)	Team Sky	+ 7"
3	Tejay van Garderen (USA)	BMC Racing Team	+ 9"
4	Philippe Gilbert (BEL)	Quick-Step Floors	+ 16"
5	Bob Jungels (LUX)	Quick-Step Floors	+ 22"
6	Rigoberto Urán (COL)	EF Education First–Drapac	+ 49"
7	Alejandro Valverde (ESP)	Movistar Team	+ 55"
8	Rafał Majka (POL)	Bora–Hansgrohe	+ 56"
9	Jakob Fuglsang (DEN)	Astana	+ 57"
10	Richie Porte (AUS)	BMC Racing Team	+ 57"

== Stage 9 ==
15 July 2018 – Arras to Roubaix, 154 km (96 mi)

Pavé sectors
No.	Name	Kilometre mark	Length (m)
15	Escaudœuvres to Thun	47.5	1600
14	Eswars to Paillencourt	53.5	1600
13	Auberchicourt to Écaillon	69	900
12	Warlaing to Brillon	86.5	2000
11	Tilloy to Sars-et-Rosières	89.5	2400
10	Beuvry to Orchies	96	1400
9	Auchy to Bersée	104.5	2700
8	Mons-en-Pévèle	110	900
7	Mérignies to Avelin	116.5	700
6	Pont-Thibault to Ennevelin	119.5	1400
5	Templeuve (Vertain Mill)	126	500
4	Cysoing to Bourghelles	132.5	1300
3	Bourghelles to Wannehain	135	1100
2	Camphin-en-Pévèle	139.5	1800
1	Willems to Hem	148.5	1400

The route to Roubaix included fifteen sectors of pavé covering 21.7 km (13.5 mi). This stage was considered likely to include an early start, to ensure no conflicting schedule with the 2018 FIFA World Cup Final.

The stage departed east from Arras, with the rolling start occurring before reaching Athies. The riders continued east to Arleux, and then southeast to the outskirts of Cambrai. The route then turned north and traversed sectors 15 and 14 of pavé, before an intermediate sprint at Wasnes-au-Bac. Sector 13 of pavé was crossed before Pecquencourt, and sectors 12, 11 and 10 as the riders headed northeast and then northwest to Orchies. Seven more sectors of pavé followed, as the route meandered north to the bonification point at Wannehain. The race then crossed the last two pavé sectors, before the finish in Roubaix.

A five-man group broke away from the front of the peloton, from the opening of the stage. Minutes later, Richie Porte suffered a collarbone injury after crashing on asphalt, and was forced to abandon the race. José Joaquín Rojas also abandoned around the same time. The leading group grew to ten riders, and established a lead approaching three and a half minutes, before sector 15 of the dry and dusty pavé. By sector 10 at Beauvry, the shrunken peloton was being led by Team Sky and had closed the gap, to the leading group, down to about two minutes. At this point, Tejay van Garderen had fallen a minute behind the peloton. Van Garderen crashed and punctured a few minutes later, and ended losing five minutes at the finish. This was one of multiple crashes or punctures for van Garderen and was the third and final time he nearly caught back up to the race when he finally stopped pursuing and fell back to assist team leader Uran. At the start of sector 6 at Pont-Thibault, the leading group's advantage had been reduced to around thirty seconds, with Reinardt Janse van Rensburg and Damien Gaudin attacking, at the head of the race. The original lead group was caught by the peloton, after sector 3 ended at Wannehain. Another lead group, including John Degenkolb, Greg Van Avermaert and Yves Lampaert, established itself before the start of sector 2 at Camphin-en-Pévèle. The new front group's lead extended to around forty-five seconds, by sector 1 at Willems, and held a lead to the finish. Most of the general classification contenders finished around half a minute behind, while Romain Bardet's incident-strewn ride finished a further few seconds back. Mikel Landa finished alongside Bardet, after Landa recovered from a crash in the last 35 km (22 mi).

Stage 9 result
Rank	Rider	Team	Time
1	John Degenkolb (GER)	Trek–Segafredo	3h 24' 26"
2	Greg Van Avermaet (BEL)	BMC Racing Team	+ 0"
3	Yves Lampaert (BEL)	Quick-Step Floors	+ 0"
4	Philippe Gilbert (BEL)	Quick-Step Floors	+ 19"
5	Peter Sagan (SVK)	Bora–Hansgrohe	+ 19"
6	Jasper Stuyven (BEL)	Trek–Segafredo	+ 19"
7	Bob Jungels (LUX)	Quick-Step Floors	+ 19"
8	André Greipel (GER)	Lotto–Soudal	+ 27"
9	Edvald Boasson Hagen (NOR)	Team Dimension Data	+ 27"
10	Timothy Dupont (BEL)	Wanty–Groupe Gobert	+ 27"

General classification after Stage 9
Rank	Rider	Team	Time
1	Greg Van Avermaet (BEL)	BMC Racing Team	36h 07' 17"
2	Geraint Thomas (GBR)	Team Sky	+ 43"
3	Philippe Gilbert (BEL)	Quick-Step Floors	+ 44"
4	Bob Jungels (LUX)	Quick-Step Floors	+ 50"
5	Alejandro Valverde (ESP)	Movistar Team	+ 1' 31"
6	Rafał Majka (POL)	Bora–Hansgrohe	+ 1' 32"
7	Jakob Fuglsang (DEN)	Astana	+ 1' 33"
8	Chris Froome (GBR)	Team Sky	+ 1' 42"
9	Adam Yates (GBR)	Mitchelton–Scott	+ 1' 42"
10	Mikel Landa (ESP)	Movistar Team	+ 1' 42"

== Rest day 1 ==
16 July 2018 – Annecy

On the first rest day, Jens Keukeleire and Alexis Vuillermoz both announced their abandonment of the race. Both riders suffered fractures during the previous stage. Keukeleire's main injury was to a fibula, acquired during the same crash which forced Richie Porte to retire. Vuillermoz was injured to his right scapula, after colliding with a spectator during sector 3 of the pavé.

== Stage 10 ==
17 July 2018 – Annecy to Le Grand-Bornand, 159 km (99 mi)

The stage departed from Annecy, heading south along the western side of Lake Annecy, with racing beginning after passing through Duingt. The riders turned north at Doussard and headed along the eastern side of the lake to Menthon-Saint-Bernard, turning northeast to the category 4 Col de Bluffy. An intermediate sprint then took place at Thônes and the race climbed and wound east, through Manigod, for the category 1 Col de la Croix Fry, ascending to 1,477 m (4,846 ft) over an 11.3 km (7.0 mi) climb. The riders then turned north, descending through La Clusaz to the valley floor at Entremont. The route began to ascend again and the race eventually turned west for the Hors catégorie climb of the Montée du plateau des Glières to 1,390 m (4,560 ft), with a 6 km (3.7 mi) climb at a gradient of 11.3%; which was immediately followed by a gravel section on the plateau, before the Col des Glières. The riders then descended, winding north with an uncategorised intermediate climb through the Col des Fleuries and continuing the descent through La Roche-sur-Foron, before turning east. After reaching the valley floor and passing through Bonneville and Scionzier, the riders then headed south over the category 1 Col de Romme to 1,297 m (4,255 ft) and partially descended southwest, before climbing the category 1 Col de la Colombière to 1,618 m (5,308 ft). The race then descended to the finish line at Le Grand-Bornand.

The race had a late start because the 2018 La Course by Le Tour de France, a women's race organised by the organisation of the Tour de France, was held in the morning. The finale was identical to the men's stage. After the top of the 16.3-kilometre-long (10.1 mi) Col de la Colombière, 15 km (9.3 mi) was left to the finish in Le Grand Bornand.

Stage 10 result
Rank	Rider	Team	Time
1	Julian Alaphilippe (FRA)	Quick-Step Floors	4h 25' 27"
2	Ion Izagirre (ESP)	Bahrain–Merida	+ 1' 34"
3	Rein Taaramäe (EST)	Direct Énergie	+ 1' 40"
4	Greg Van Avermaet (BEL)	BMC Racing Team	+ 1' 44"
5	Serge Pauwels (BEL)	Team Dimension Data	+ 1' 44"
6	Lilian Calmejane (FRA)	Direct Énergie	+ 2' 24"
7	Dan Martin (IRL)	UAE Team Emirates	+ 3' 23"
8	Primož Roglič (SLO)	LottoNL–Jumbo	+ 3' 23"
9	David Gaudu (FRA)	Groupama–FDJ	+ 3' 23"
10	Geraint Thomas (GBR)	Team Sky	+ 3' 23"

General classification after Stage 10
Rank	Rider	Team	Time
1	Greg Van Avermaet (BEL)	BMC Racing Team	40h 34' 28"
2	Geraint Thomas (GBR)	Team Sky	+ 2' 22"
3	Alejandro Valverde (ESP)	Movistar Team	+ 3' 10"
4	Jakob Fuglsang (DEN)	Astana	+ 3' 12"
5	Bob Jungels (LUX)	Quick-Step Floors	+ 3' 20"
6	Chris Froome (GBR)	Team Sky	+ 3' 21"
7	Adam Yates (GBR)	Mitchelton–Scott	+ 3' 21"
8	Mikel Landa (ESP)	Movistar Team	+ 3' 21"
9	Vincenzo Nibali (ITA)	Bahrain–Merida	+ 3' 27"
10	Primož Roglič (SLO)	LottoNL–Jumbo	+ 3' 36"

== Stage 11 ==
18 July 2018 – Albertville to La Rosière, 108 km (67 mi)

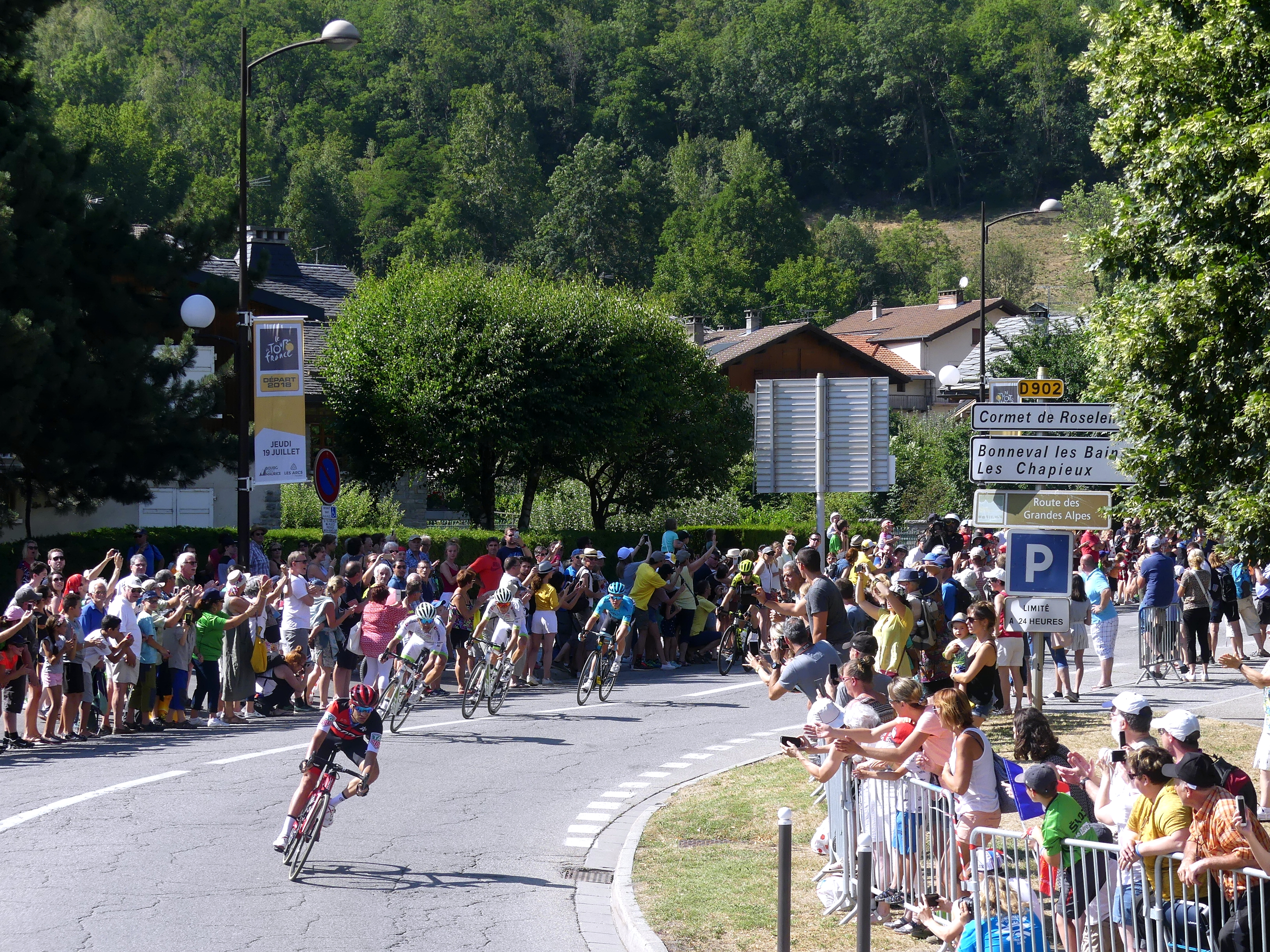
The leading breakaway group at Bourg-Saint-Maurice

The riders departed from Albertville heading northeast to an intermediate sprint at Villard-sur-Doron. The race then began the 12.4 km (7.7 mi) climb of the Hors catégorie Montée de Bisanne to 1,723 m (5,653 ft). After descending south to the valley floor at Beaufort, the riders immediately began the Hors catégorie 12.6 km (7.8 mi) climb through Arêches and turned east into the Col du Pré at 1,748 m (5,735 ft). Following a short descent to cross the Roselend Dam, the climb continued into the category 2 Cormet de Roselend at 1,968 m (6,457 ft). The riders then faced an 18 km (11 mi) descent to the valley floor at Bourg-Saint-Maurice. After gently climbing through Séez and Montvalezan, the race then turned north for the 17.6 km (10.9 mi) category 1 climb to the finish line at La Rosière ski station, at an elevation of 1,855 m (6,086 ft).

Mark Cavendish finished an hour and five minutes behind Geraint Thomas, so was classified as outside the 31 minute and 27 second time limit for the stage. Mark Renshaw and Marcel Kittel also failed to finish within the time limit and were unable to continue the Tour. Meanwhile, Rick Zabel finished just outside the limit, but was allowed to continue by the race officials, having also been victim to a mechanical problem.

Stage 11 result
Rank	Rider	Team	Time
1	Geraint Thomas (GBR)	Team Sky	3h 29' 36"
2	Tom Dumoulin (NED)	Team Sunweb	+ 20"
3	Chris Froome (GBR)	Team Sky	+ 20"
4	Damiano Caruso (ITA)	BMC Racing Team	+ 22"
5	Mikel Nieve (ESP)	Mitchelton–Scott	+ 22"
6	Dan Martin (IRL)	UAE Team Emirates	+ 27"
7	Jesús Herrada (ESP)	Cofidis	+ 57"
8	Romain Bardet (FRA)	AG2R La Mondiale	+ 59"
9	Vincenzo Nibali (ITA)	Bahrain–Merida	+ 59"
10	Nairo Quintana (COL)	Movistar Team	+ 59"

General classification after Stage 11
Rank	Rider	Team	Time
1	Geraint Thomas (GBR)	Team Sky	44h 06' 16"
2	Chris Froome (GBR)	Team Sky	+ 1' 25"
3	Tom Dumoulin (NED)	Team Sunweb	+ 1' 44"
4	Vincenzo Nibali (ITA)	Bahrain–Merida	+ 2' 14"
5	Primož Roglič (SLO)	LottoNL–Jumbo	+ 2' 23"
6	Steven Kruijswijk (NED)	LottoNL–Jumbo	+ 2' 40"
7	Mikel Landa (ESP)	Movistar Team	+ 2' 56"
8	Romain Bardet (FRA)	AG2R La Mondiale	+ 2' 58"
9	Nairo Quintana (COL)	Movistar Team	+ 3' 16"
10	Dan Martin (IRL)	UAE Team Emirates	+ 3' 16"
