= Anos, Pyrénées-Atlantiques =

Anos
- Commune
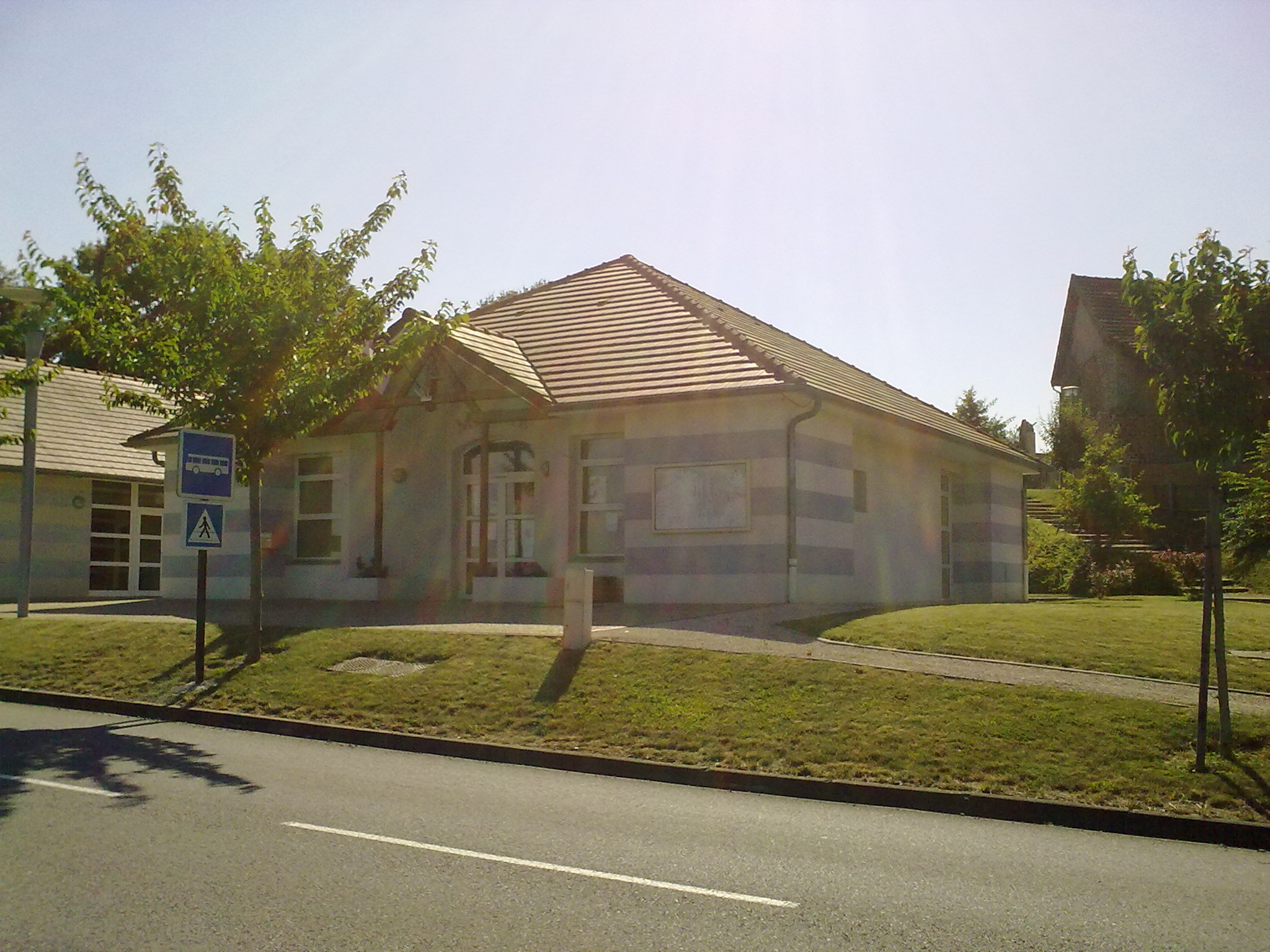
- Town hall
- Location of Anos
- Location within France Location within Nouvelle-Aquitaine
- Coordinates: 43°23′57″N 0°17′29″W
- Country: France
- Region: Nouvelle-Aquitaine
- Department: Pyrénées-Atlantiques
- Arrondissement: Pau
- Canton: Pays de Morlaàs et du Montanérès
- Intercommunality: Nord Est Béarn

Government
  - Mayor (2020–2026): Christelle Desclaux
- Area^{1}: 1.79 km^{2} (0.69 sq mi)
- Elevation: 250 m (820 ft)
- Highest elevation: 305 m (1,001 ft)
- Lowest elevation: 199 m (653 ft)
- Population (2023): 174
  - Density: 97.2/km^{2} (252/sq mi)
- Time zone: UTC+01:00 (CET)
  - Summer (DST): UTC+02:00 (CEST)
- INSEE/Postal code: 64027 /64160
- ^{1} French Land Register data, which excludes lakes, ponds, glaciers > 1 km^{2} (0.386 sq mi or 247 acres) and river estuaries.

Anos (French pronunciation: [anɔs]; Occitan: Anòs) is a commune in the Pyrénées-Atlantiques department in the Nouvelle-Aquitaine region of southwestern France. It is part of the urban area (aire d'attraction des villes) of Pau.

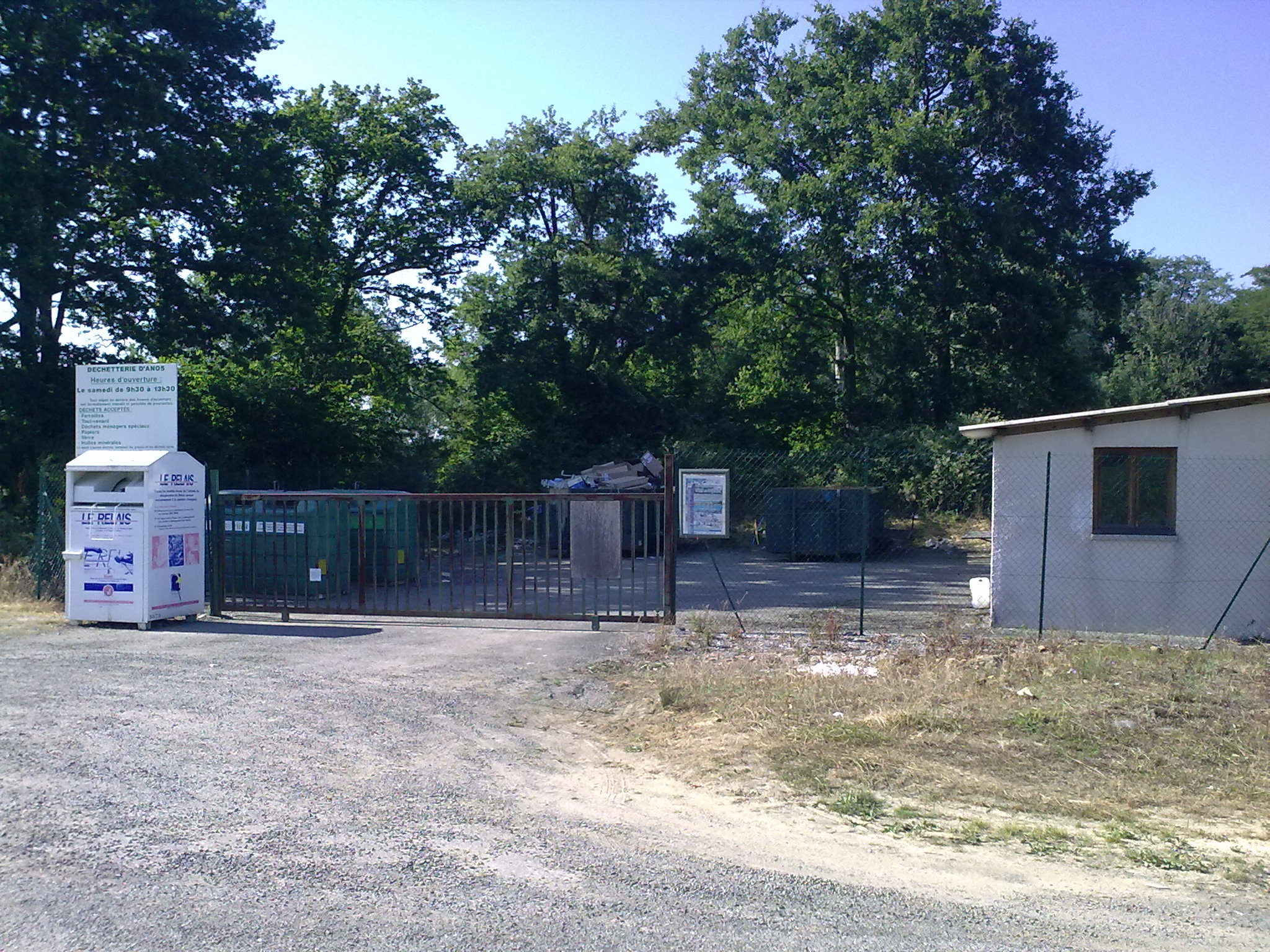
The recycling centre

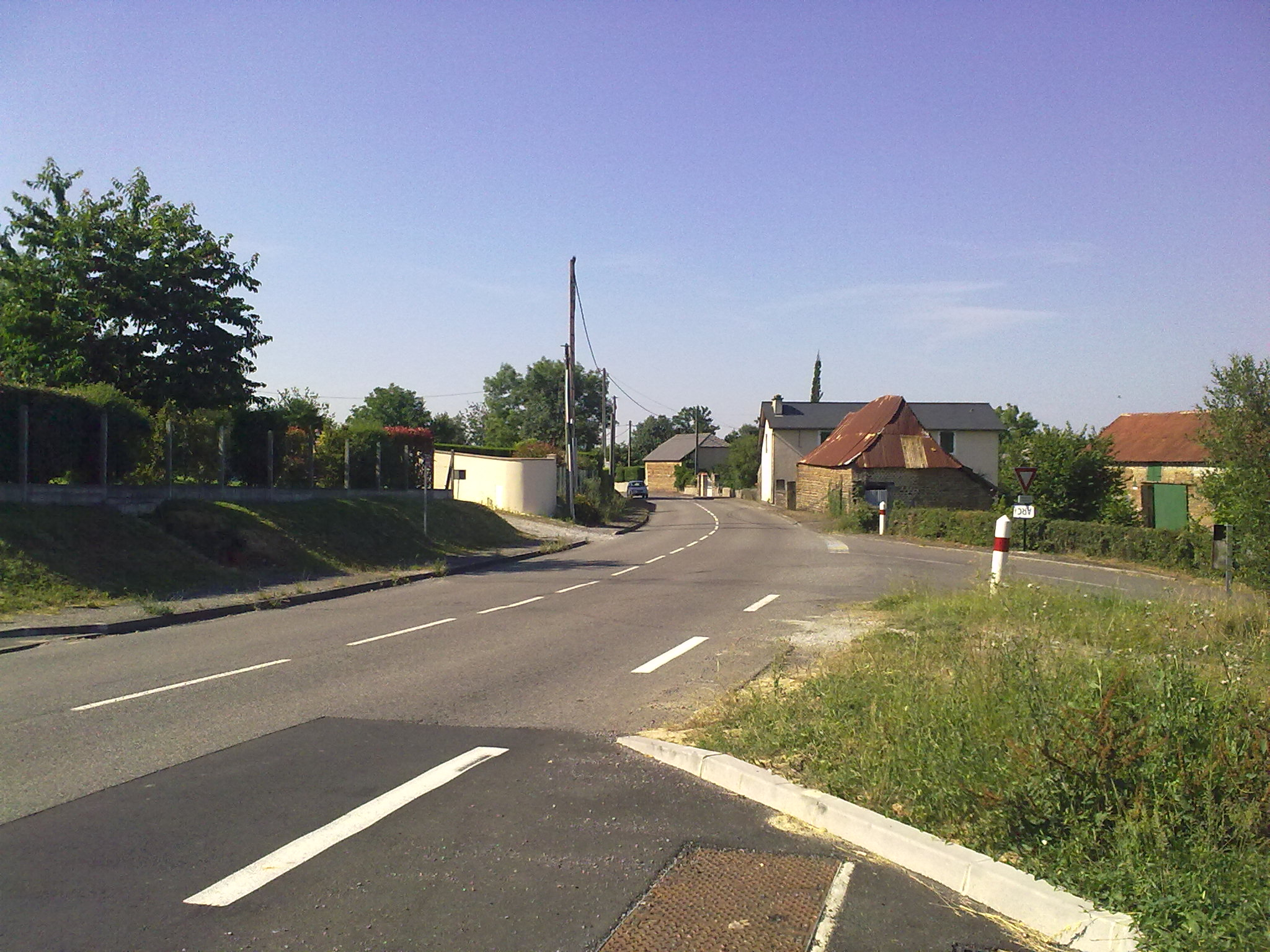
The Main road from the Town Hall

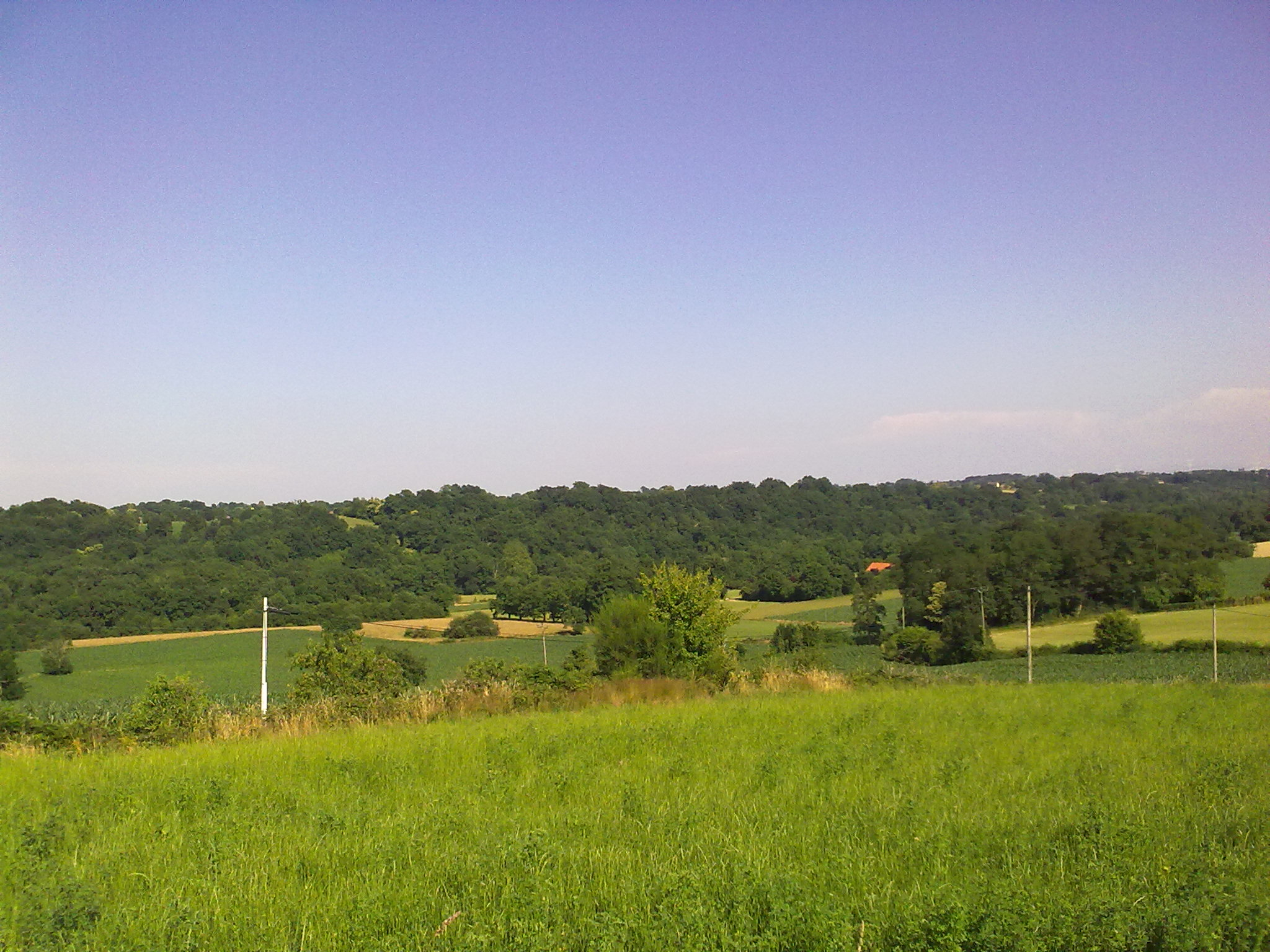
Landscape from the Town Hall

== Geography ==
Anos is located some 15 km north-east of Pau and 10 km south-east of Auriac. Access to the commune is by road D39 from Morlaas in the south passing north through the commune and the village and continuing north to join the D834 just north of Astis. Several other country roads also pass through the commune.

The Lau river forms the western border of the commune with the eastern shore of the Lake of Saint-Amour (also called the Lake of Anos) forming the part just west of the village. The Lau flows north to join the Luy de France which also forms the eastern border of the commune.

=== Historical Localities and hamlets ===
- Guilhem
- Guillaumet
- Guiraut
- Jouannes
- Lartigue
- Peyré
- Peys
- Puyau
- Tachoères

== Toponymy ==
The commune name in Béarnais is Anòs (according to the classical norm of Occitan).

Brigitte Jobbé-Duval indicates that Anos could be of Gallic origin being the name of the property owner Andus plus the suffix -ossu with a proposed meaning of "Domain of Andus".

The name Anos was mentioned in 1243 in the Titles of Ossau and in the Cassini map in 1750).

== History ==
Paul Raymond noted on page 6 of the 1863 dictionary that in the 14th century Anos belonged to the community of Preachers of Morlaàs.

The commune was part of the archdeaconry of Vic-Bihl which depended on the diocese of Lescar of which Lembeye was the capital.

== Administration ==
List of Successive Mayors

From	To	Name
1995	2008	Jacques Cantonnet
2008	2014	Patrick Yacger
2014	2026	Christelle Desclaux

=== Inter-communality ===
Anos is part of five inter-communal structures:

- The Communauté de communes du Nord-Est Béarn;
- The SIVU for the maintenance of roads, parks and buildings in Barinque;
- The AEP association for the Regions of Luy and Gabas;
- The Energy association of Pyrénées-Atlantiques;
- The iner-communal association for irrigation of Anos - Saint-Armou.

== Demography ==
The inhabitants of the commune are known as Anosiens or Anosiennes in French.

Historical population

Year	Pop.	±% p.a.
1793	94	—
1821	81	−0.53%
1846	129	+1.88%
1872	99	−1.01%
1901	89	−0.37%
1926	73	−0.79%
1946	58	−1.14%
1962	58	+0.00%
1968	40	−6.00%

Year	Pop.	±% p.a.
1975	44	+1.37%
1982	62	+5.02%
1990	120	+8.60%
1999	149	+2.43%
2007	185	+2.74%
2012	185	+0.00%
2017	192	+0.75%
2023	174	−1.63%

Source: EHESS and INSEE (1968-2023)

== Culture and Heritage ==
=== Civil heritage ===
- The Maison Tachoères farmhouse (1768) is registered as an historical monument.
- Other Houses and Farms (18th-19th century) are also registered as historical monuments.

=== Religious heritage ===
- The Parish Church of Saint-Laurent (11th century) is registered as an historical monument.

=== Environmental heritage ===
An artificial lake called Lake Saint-Armou or Lake of Anos is on the border between the two communes.

== See also ==
- Communes of the Pyrénées-Atlantiques department
