= 2007 Tour de France, Prologue to Stage 10 =

Cycling race stages

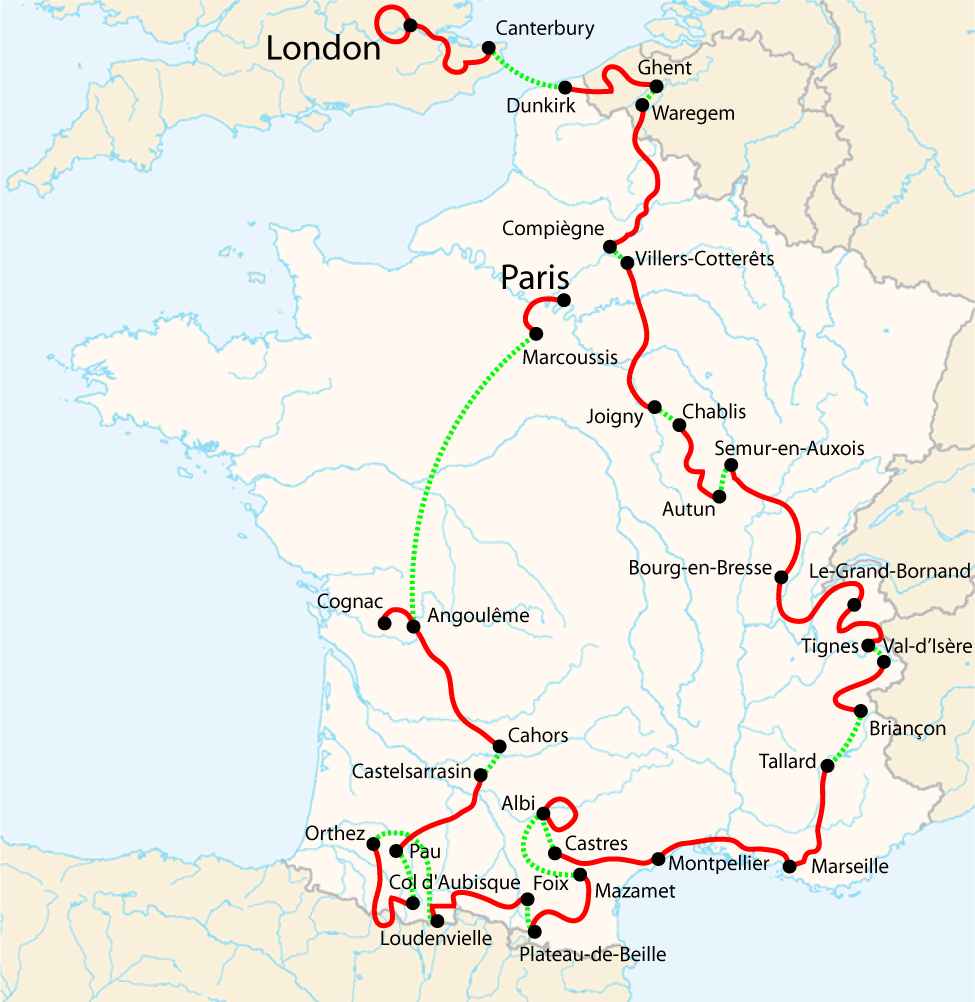
Stages in 2007

These are the profiles for the individual stages in the 2007 Tour de France, with the Prologue on 7 July, Stage 1 on 8 July, and Stage 10 on 18 July.

== Prologue ==
2007-07-07 — London (England) – 7.9 km (ITT)

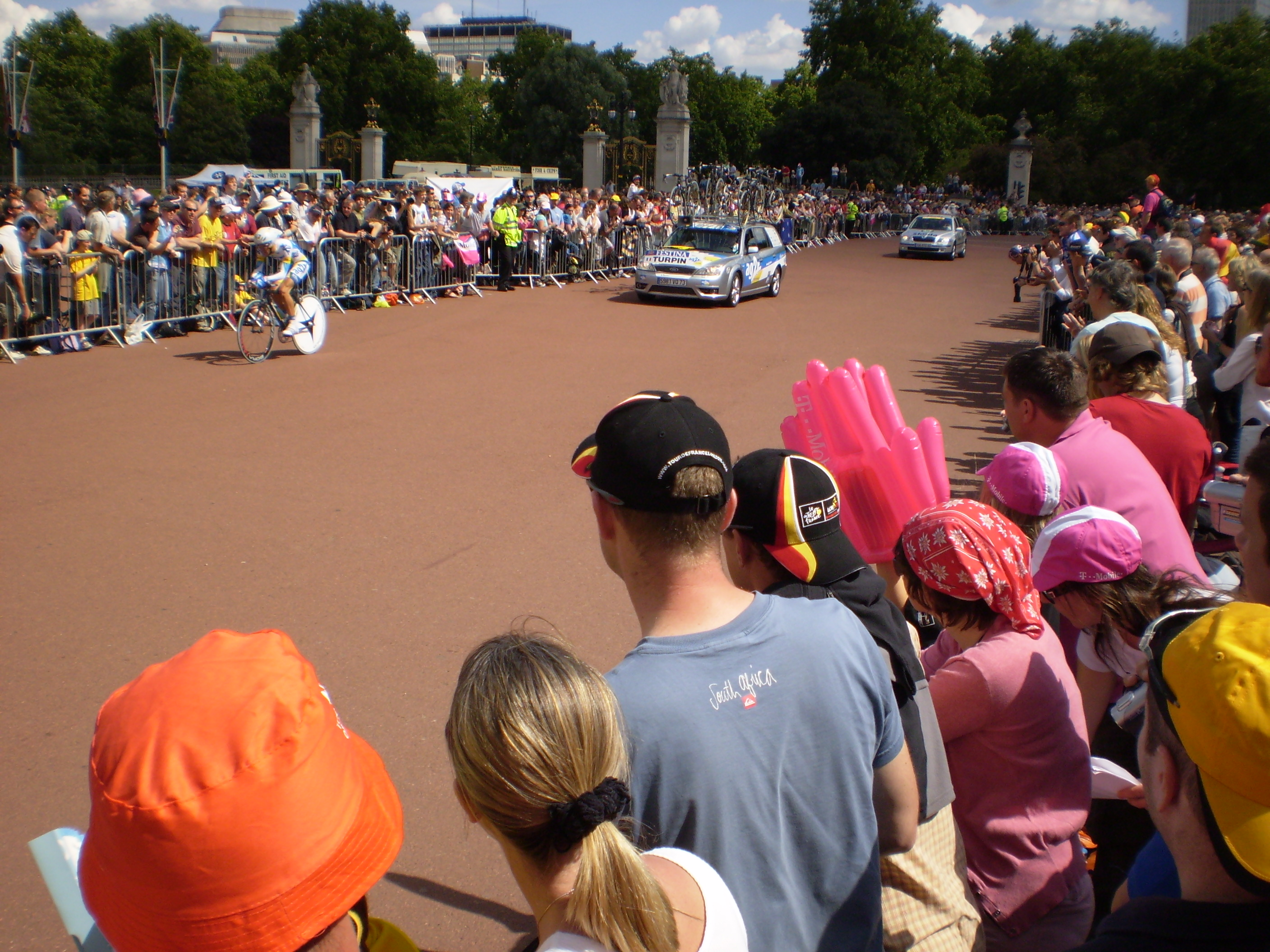
Ludovic Turpin of AG2R Prévoyance competes in the Prologue.

On Saturday July 7, 2007, the Individual time trial started in Whitehall, London passing Westminster, then along Victoria Street and Buckingham Gate, past Buckingham Palace and looping through Hyde Park before finishing in The Mall. A distance of 7.9 km (4.9 mi) was covered by the riders. It was won by Team CSC's Fabian Cancellara, with a time of 8' 50".

Prologue result

Rank	Rider	Team	Time
1	Fabian Cancellara (SUI)	Team CSC	8' 50"
2	Andreas Klöden (GER)	Astana	+ 13"
3	George Hincapie (USA)	Discovery Channel	+ 23"
4	Bradley Wiggins (GBR)	Cofidis	+ 23"
5	Vladimir Gusev (RUS)	Discovery Channel	+ 25"
6	Vladimir Karpets (RUS)	Caisse d'Epargne	+ 26"
7	Alexander Vinokourov (KAZ)	Astana	+ 30"
8	Thomas Dekker (NED)	Rabobank	+ 31"
9	Manuel Quinziato (ITA)	Liquigas	+ 32"
10	Benoît Vaugrenard (FRA)	Française des Jeux	+ 32"

General Classification after Prologue

Rank	Rider	Team	Time
1	Fabian Cancellara (SUI)	Team CSC	8' 50"
2	Andreas Klöden (GER)	Astana	+ 13"
3	George Hincapie (USA)	Discovery Channel	+ 23"
4	Bradley Wiggins (GBR)	Cofidis	+ 23"
5	Vladimir Gusev (RUS)	Discovery Channel	+ 25"
6	Vladimir Karpets (RUS)	Caisse d'Epargne	+ 26"
7	Alexander Vinokourov (KAZ)	Astana	+ 30"
8	Thomas Dekker (NED)	Rabobank	+ 31"
9	Manuel Quinziato (ITA)	Liquigas	+ 32"
10	Benoît Vaugrenard (FRA)	Française des Jeux	+ 32"

== Stage 1 ==
2007-07-08 — London (England) – Canterbury (England), 203 km

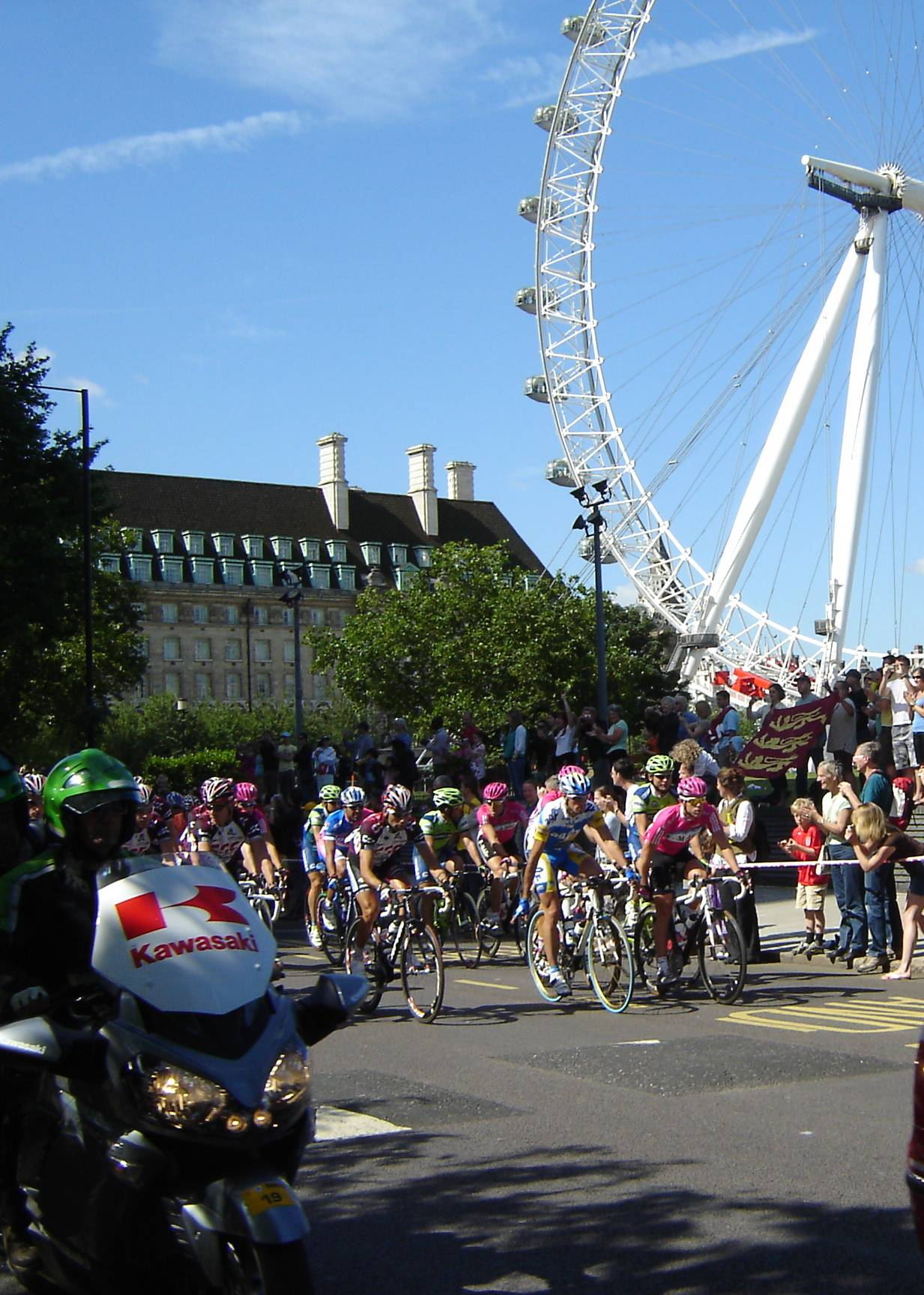
Tour de France 2007. The procession passes through the streets of London.

This 203 km (126 mi) stage of the race started in London and headed through Westminster, Greenwich, Woolwich, Erith and into Kent, to Dartford, Gravesend, with an intermediate sprint for the points classification in Medway. The route headed south to Maidstone and another sprint, Tonbridge and then the first King of the Mountains climb before reaching Royal Tunbridge Wells, then the second climb at Goudhurst, another sprint in Tenterden, to Ashford and the final climb before finishing in Canterbury. All the climbs were Category 4. It was won by Robbie McEwen, who sprinted from the back of the field to claim a surprise win. This was after an extended breakaway from British cyclist David Millar.

Stage 1 result

Rank	Rider	Team	Time
1	Robbie McEwen (AUS)	Predictor–Lotto	4h 39' 01"
2	Thor Hushovd (NOR)	Crédit Agricole	s.t.
3	Tom Boonen (BEL)	Quick-Step–Innergetic	s.t.
4	Sébastien Chavanel (FRA)	Française des Jeux	s.t.
5	Romain Feillu (FRA)	Agritubel	s.t.
6	Robert Förster (GER)	Gerolsteiner	s.t.
7	Óscar Freire (ESP)	Rabobank	s.t.
8	Marcus Burghardt (GER)	T-Mobile Team	s.t.
9	Francisco Ventoso (ESP)	Saunier Duval–Prodir	s.t.
10	Tomas Vaitkus (LTU)	Discovery Channel	s.t.

General classification after stage 1

Rank	Rider	Team	Time
1	Fabian Cancellara (SUI)	Team CSC	4h 47' 51"
2	Andreas Klöden (GER)	Astana	+ 13"
3	David Millar (GBR)	Saunier Duval–Prodir	+ 21"
4	George Hincapie (USA)	Discovery Channel	+ 23"
5	Bradley Wiggins (GBR)	Cofidis	+ 23"
6	Vladimir Gusev (RUS)	Discovery Channel	+ 25"
7	Vladimir Karpets (RUS)	Caisse d'Epargne	+ 26"
8	Thor Hushovd (NOR)	Crédit Agricole	+ 29"
9	Alexander Vinokourov (KAZ)	Astana	+ 30"
10	Thomas Dekker (NED)	Rabobank	+ 31"

== Stage 2 ==
2007-07-09 — Dunkirk – Ghent (Belgium), 168.5 km

The second stage marked the return of the Tour to the land of cycling, along the roads of the great Flanders classics: Tour of Flanders, Het Volk, etc. It was anticipated that the race should start to get more serious during this stage, with the wind and the risk of hitting the kerbs definitely playing an important role. It was fairly short at 168.5 km (104.7 mi) in length and with no categorized climbs.

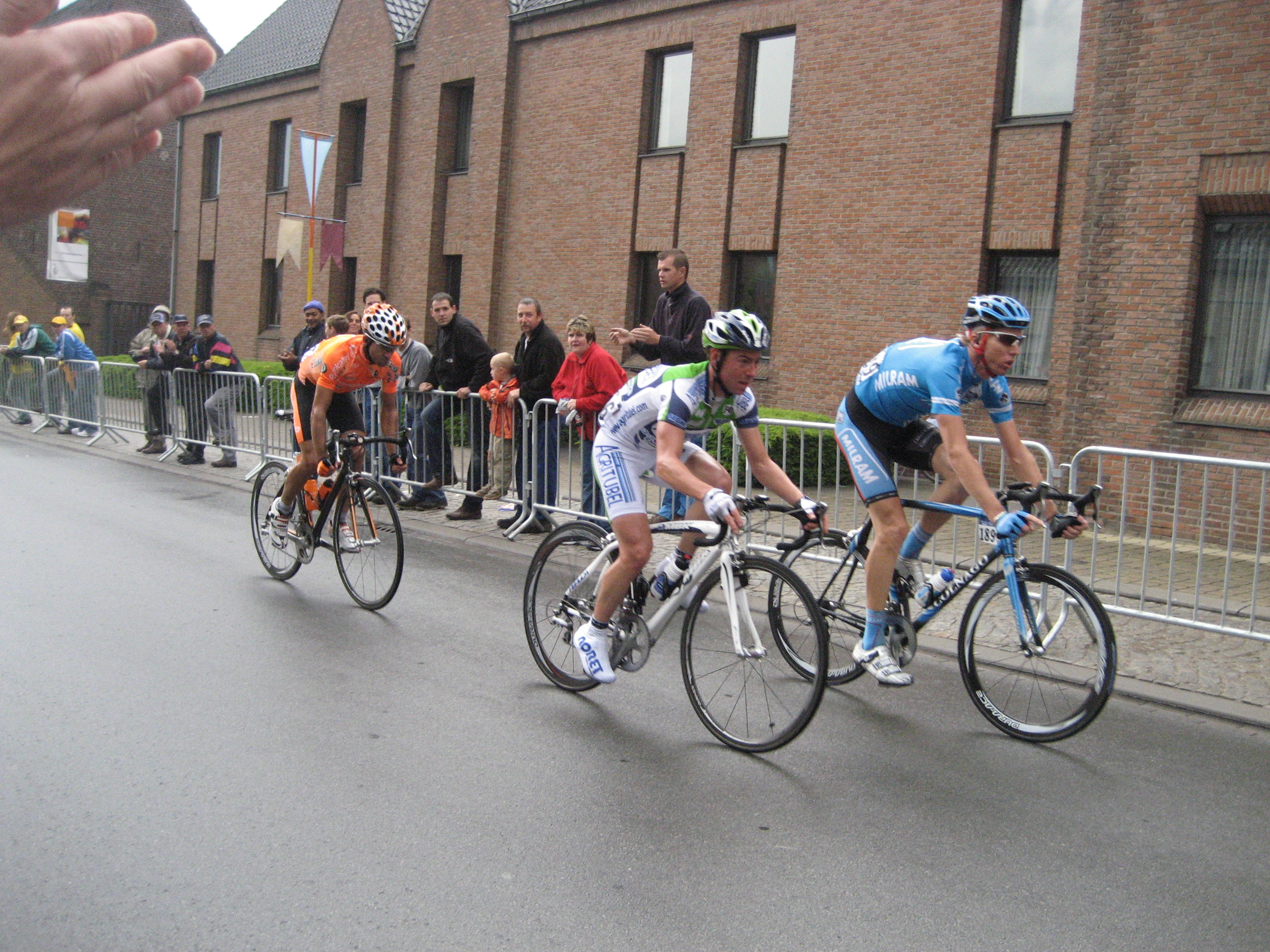
The riders Marcel Sieberg, Rubén Pérez and Cédric Herve at the head of the second stage. Credit: Lieven Gekiere

There was a breakaway during the stage by Marcel Sieberg, Cedric Herve and Rubén Pérez who shared the bonuses available at the three sprints: however, this never stretched beyond 6 minutes ahead of the peloton and they were caught some 3 km from the finish.

Within the last 2 km, a Liquigas rider fell sideways causing others to fall. Around 20 riders fell blocking the entire road and leaving approximately 30 riders to sprint for the victory, eventually taken by Gert Steegmans in his home country ahead of his compatriot and team-mate Tom Boonen, who took over the green jersey by coming second in the stage.

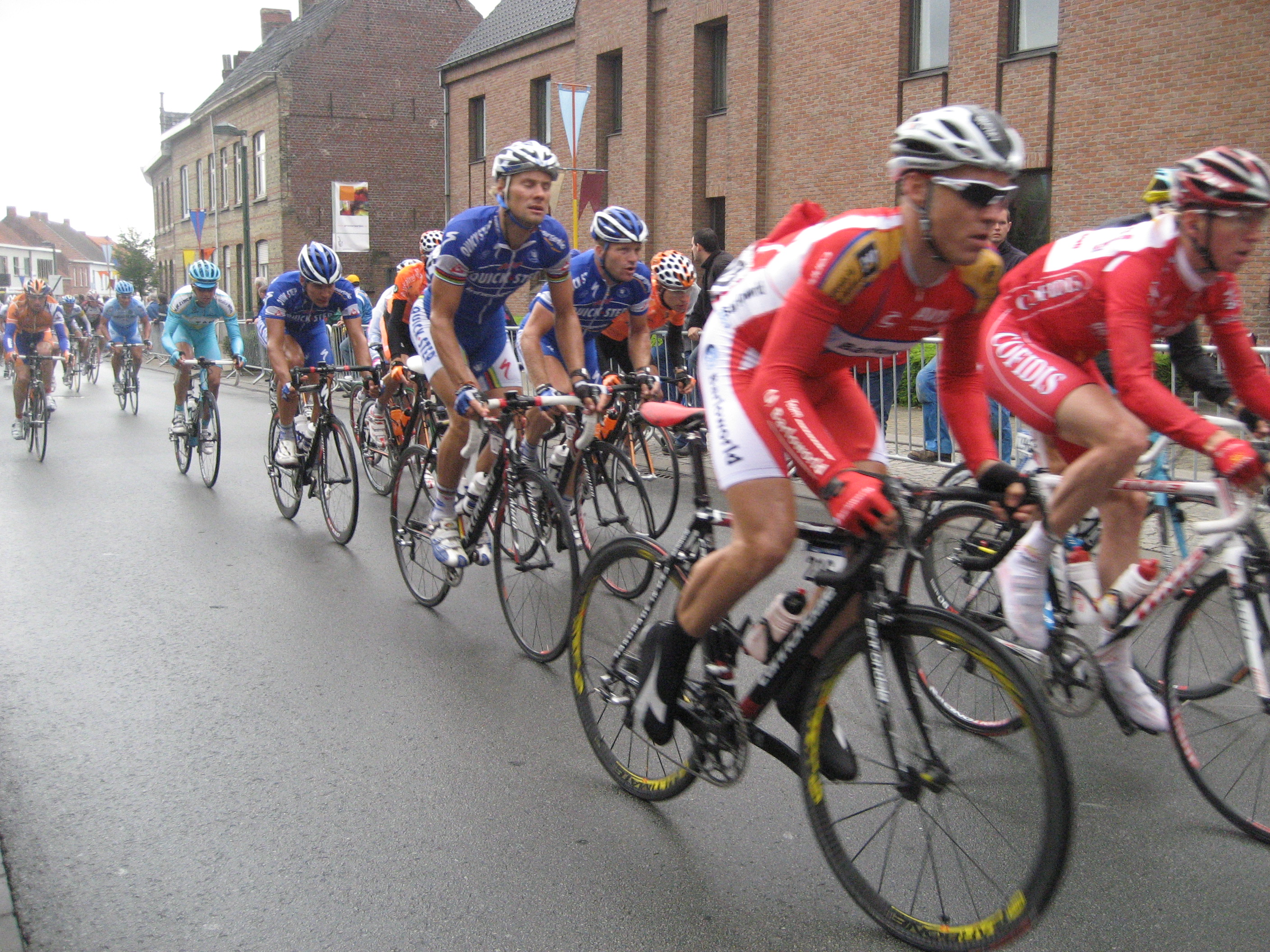
Tom Boonen (blue outfit, centre) during the race. Credit: Lieven Gekiere

Stage 2 result

Rank	Rider	Team	Time
1	Gert Steegmans (BEL)	Quick-Step–Innergetic	3h 48' 22"
2	Tom Boonen (BEL)	Quick-Step–Innergetic	s.t.
3	Filippo Pozzato (ITA)	Liquigas	s.t.
4	Robert Hunter (RSA)	Barloworld	s.t.
5	Romain Feillu (FRA)	Agritubel	s.t.
6	Robbie McEwen (AUS)	Predictor–Lotto	s.t.
7	Erik Zabel (GER)	Team Milram	s.t.
8	Heinrich Haussler (GER)	Gerolsteiner	s.t.
9	Óscar Freire (ESP)	Rabobank	s.t.
10	Sébastien Chavanel (FRA)	Française des Jeux	s.t.

General classification after stage 2

Rank	Rider	Team	Time
1	Fabian Cancellara (SUI)	Team CSC	8h 36' 13"
2	Andreas Klöden (GER)	Astana	+ 13"
3	David Millar (GBR)	Saunier Duval–Prodir	+ 21"
4	George Hincapie (USA)	Discovery Channel	+ 23"
5	Bradley Wiggins (GBR)	Cofidis	+ 23"
6	Vladimir Gusev (RUS)	Discovery Channel	+ 25"
7	Tom Boonen (BEL)	Quick-Step–Innergetic	+ 26"
8	Vladimir Karpets (RUS)	Caisse d'Epargne	+ 26"
9	Thor Hushovd (NOR)	Crédit Agricole	+ 29"
10	Alexander Vinokourov (KAZ)	Astana	+ 30"

== Stage 3 ==
2007-07-10 — Waregem (Belgium) – Compiègne, 236 km

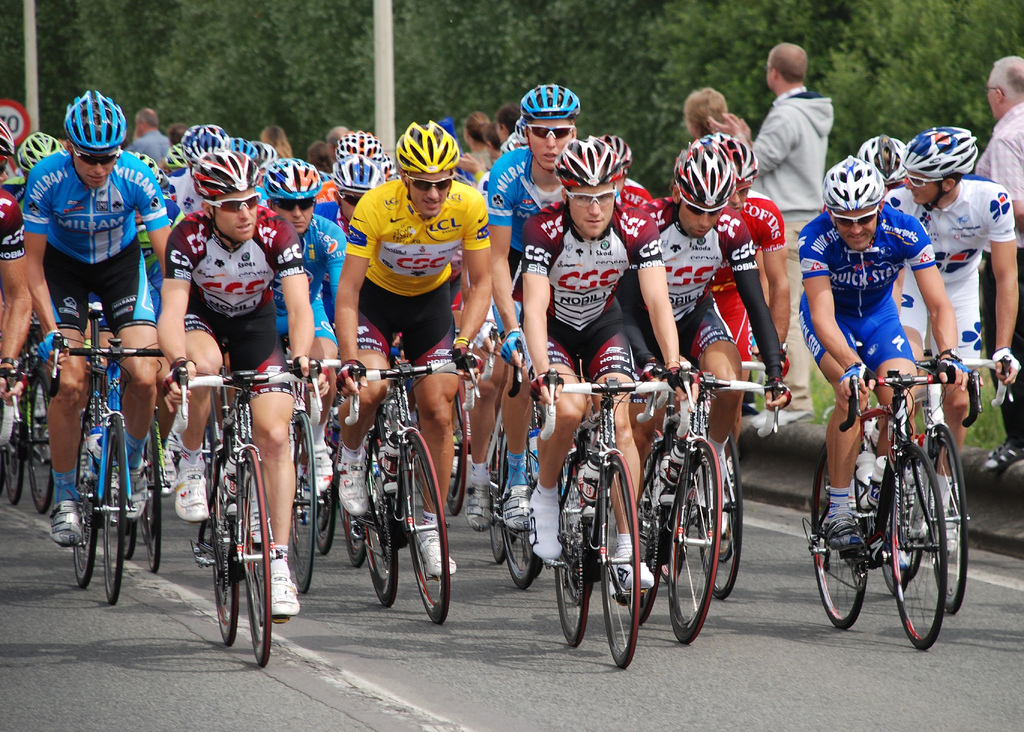
Fabian Cancellara in his yellow jersey and the peloton just after the start of the 3rd stage in Waregem, Belgium. Credit: Johan Vandamme

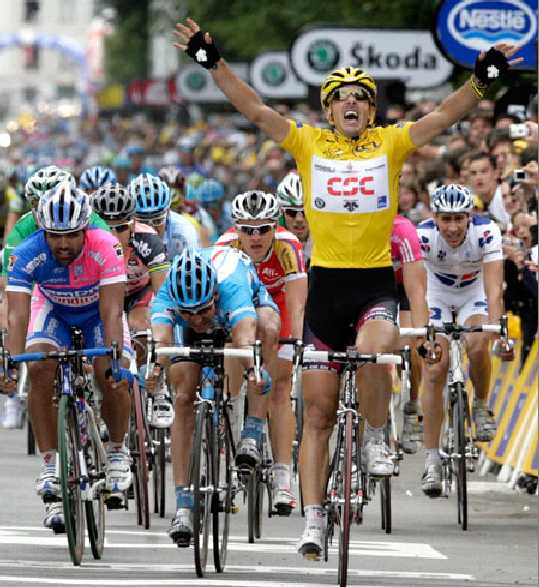
Fabian Cancellara winning the sprint of the 3rd stage of the 2007 Tour de France.

At 236 km (147 mi), this is the longest stage in this year's Tour. After Flanders, the peloton returned to France along some of the roads used for the Paris–Roubaix race, to finish in the town where that race starts. Nicolas Vogondy and Mathieu Ladagnous broke away from the field within the first 10 km, and were joined after 42 km by Stéphane Augé and Frederik Willems. By leading the breakaway group over the only classified climb of the day, the Cote de Blerancourt, Auge gained the polka dot shirt. The group was caught by race leader Fabian Cancellara, and by the rest of the peloton, some 500 meters from the finish. Cancellara held off the sprinters to win the stage and to gain time bonuses that extended his lead in the general classification.

Stage 3 result

Rank	Rider	Team	Time
1	Fabian Cancellara (SUI)	Team CSC	6h 36' 15"
2	Erik Zabel (GER)	Team Milram	s.t.
3	Danilo Napolitano (ITA)	Lampre–Fondital	s.t.
4	Tom Boonen (BEL)	Quick-Step–Innergetic	s.t.
5	Robert Hunter (RSA)	Barloworld	s.t.
6	Robert Förster (GER)	Gerolsteiner	s.t.
7	Robbie McEwen (AUS)	Predictor–Lotto	s.t.
8	Bernhard Eisel (AUT)	T-Mobile Team	s.t.
9	Mark Cavendish (GBR)	T-Mobile Team	s.t.
10	Heinrich Haussler (GER)	Gerolsteiner	s.t.

General classification after stage 3

Rank	Rider	Team	Time
1	Fabian Cancellara (SUI)	Team CSC	15h 12' 08"
2	Andreas Klöden (GER)	Astana	+ 33"
3	David Millar (GBR)	Saunier Duval–Prodir	+ 41"
4	George Hincapie (USA)	Discovery Channel	+ 43"
5	Bradley Wiggins (GBR)	Cofidis	+ 43"
6	Vladimir Gusev (RUS)	Discovery Channel	+ 45"
7	Tom Boonen (BEL)	Quick-Step–Innergetic	+ 46"
8	Vladimir Karpets (RUS)	Caisse d'Epargne	+ 46"
9	Thor Hushovd (NOR)	Crédit Agricole	+ 49"
10	Mikel Astarloza (ESP)	Euskaltel–Euskadi	+ 49"

== Stage 4 ==
2007-07-11 — Villers-Cotterêts – Joigny, 193 km

This stage headed virtually due south, with four category 4 climbs, passing through the Champagne region and the plains of Brie, before crossing the valleys in the Yonne department along its 193 km (120 mi) course. Injuries received in the race for points on the first hill, forced Xabier Zandio's immediate withdrawal, and caused Rémy Di Gregorio to finish almost 8 minutes behind the leaders and rendered him unfit to resume the race the next day. The main breakaway was initiated by Matthieu Sprick and he was joined by Sylvain Chavanel (whose time bonuses gained at intermediate sprints and hills lifted him into the top 10 in the general classification), Gorka Verdugo, Juan Antonio Flecha and Christian Knees; the lead over the peloton was never more than four minutes, and they were caught with just under 5 km remaining. In the first clean sprint of this year's race, Thor Hushovd won from Robert Hunter and earned time bonuses that moved him into second place overall.

Stage 4 result

Rank	Rider	Team	Time
1	Thor Hushovd (NOR)	Crédit Agricole	4h 37' 47"
2	Robert Hunter (RSA)	Barloworld	s.t.
3	Óscar Freire (ESP)	Rabobank	s.t.
4	Erik Zabel (GER)	Team Milram	s.t.
5	Danilo Napolitano (ITA)	Lampre–Fondital	s.t.
6	Gert Steegmans (BEL)	Quick-Step–Innergetic	s.t.
7	Robert Förster (GER)	Gerolsteiner	s.t.
8	Tom Boonen (BEL)	Quick-Step–Innergetic	s.t.
9	Sébastien Chavanel (FRA)	Française des Jeux	s.t.
10	Mark Cavendish (GBR)	T-Mobile Team	s.t.

General classification after stage 4

Rank	Rider	Team	Time
1	Fabian Cancellara (SUI)	Team CSC	19h 49' 55"
2	Thor Hushovd (NOR)	Crédit Agricole	+ 29"
3	Andreas Klöden (GER)	Astana	+ 33"
4	David Millar (GBR)	Saunier Duval–Prodir	+ 41"
5	George Hincapie (USA)	Discovery Channel	+ 43"
6	Bradley Wiggins (GBR)	Cofidis	+ 43"
7	Sylvain Chavanel (FRA)	Cofidis	+ 44"
8	Vladimir Gusev (RUS)	Discovery Channel	+ 45"
9	Tom Boonen (BEL)	Quick-Step–Innergetic	+ 46"
10	Vladimir Karpets (RUS)	Caisse d'Epargne	+ 46"

== Stage 5 ==
2007-07-12 — Chablis – Autun, 182.5 km

The fifth stage featured eight climbs, including one Category 2 climb. Many of the sprinters lost contact with the peloton, but all of the major contenders finished together, apart from Alexander Vinokourov. Vinokourov crashed before the final climb, and ended up losing more than a minute to the rest of the field. The stage was won by Filippo Pozzato.

Stage 5 result

Rank	Rider	Team	Time
1	Filippo Pozzato (ITA)	Liquigas	4h 39' 01"
2	Óscar Freire (ESP)	Rabobank	s.t.
3	Daniele Bennati (ITA)	Lampre–Fondital	s.t.
4	Kim Kirchen (LUX)	T-Mobile Team	s.t.
5	Erik Zabel (GER)	Team Milram	s.t.
6	George Hincapie (USA)	Discovery Channel	s.t.
7	Cristian Moreni (ITA)	Cofidis	s.t.
8	Stefan Schumacher (GER)	Gerolsteiner	s.t.
9	Bram Tankink (NED)	Quick-Step–Innergetic	s.t.
10	Jérôme Pineau (FRA)	Bouygues Télécom	s.t.

General classification after stage 5

Rank	Rider	Team	Time
1	Fabian Cancellara (SUI)	Team CSC	24h 28' 56"
2	Andreas Klöden (GER)	Astana	+ 33"
3	Filippo Pozzato (ITA)	Liquigas	+ 35"
4	David Millar (GBR)	Saunier Duval–Prodir	+ 41"
5	George Hincapie (USA)	Discovery Channel	+ 43"
6	Vladimir Gusev (RUS)	Discovery Channel	+ 45"
7	Vladimir Karpets (RUS)	Caisse d'Epargne	+ 46"
8	Mikel Astarloza (ESP)	Euskaltel–Euskadi	+ 49"
9	Thomas Dekker (NED)	Rabobank	+ 51"
10	Benoît Vaugrenard (FRA)	Française des Jeux	+ 52"

== Stage 6 ==
2007-07-13 — Semur-en-Auxois – Bourg-en-Bresse, 199.5 km

This stage is relatively flat, with only two category 4 climbs, and was the last opportunity for the sprinters to shine before the race went into the mountains. On the 40th anniversary of the death of Tom Simpson, Cofidis rider Bradley Wiggins led from the two kilometre mark and at one stage was 18 minutes clear, but riding alone took its toll and with seven kilometres left he was reeled in. That left Tom Boonen to beat Óscar Freire and Erik Zabel in a sprint finish for his first Tour stage win in two years. After the stage Wiggins revealed his lone breakaway was a gift to his wife on her birthday, with Wiggins only finding out about the date's significance after the race.

Stage 6 result

Rank	Rider	Team	Time
1	Tom Boonen (BEL)	Quick-Step–Innergetic	5h 20' 59"
2	Óscar Freire (ESP)	Rabobank	s.t.
3	Erik Zabel (GER)	Team Milram	s.t.
4	Sébastien Chavanel (FRA)	Française des Jeux	s.t.
5	Thor Hushovd (NOR)	Crédit Agricole	s.t.
6	Daniele Bennati (ITA)	Lampre–Fondital	s.t.
7	Robert Förster (GER)	Gerolsteiner	s.t.
8	Robert Hunter (RSA)	Barloworld	s.t.
9	Romain Feillu (FRA)	Agritubel	s.t.
10	Murilo Fischer (BRA)	Liquigas	s.t.

General classification after stage 6

Rank	Rider	Team	Time
1	Fabian Cancellara (SUI)	Team CSC	29h 49' 55"
2	Andreas Klöden (GER)	Astana	+ 33"
3	Filippo Pozzato (ITA)	Liquigas	+ 35"
4	David Millar (GBR)	Saunier Duval–Prodir	+ 41"
5	George Hincapie (USA)	Discovery Channel	+ 43"
6	Óscar Freire (ESP)	Rabobank	+ 43"
7	Vladimir Gusev (RUS)	Discovery Channel	+ 45"
8	Vladimir Karpets (RUS)	Caisse d'Epargne	+ 46"
9	Erik Zabel (GER)	Team Milram	+ 48"
10	Mikel Astarloza (ESP)	Euskaltel–Euskadi	+ 49"

== Stage 7 ==
2007-07-14 — Bourg-en-Bresse – Le Grand-Bornand, 197.5 km

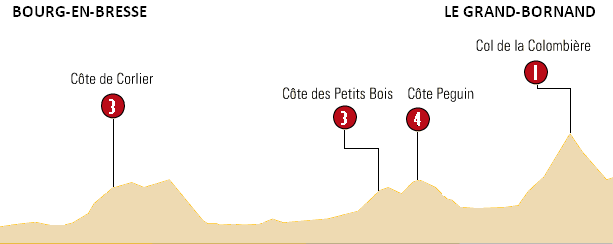
Stage 7 layout.

This was the first mountain stage and the start of the real difficulties for many of the riders. The first kilometres, with three smaller climbs, were a gradual introduction for the riders, before they tackled the Alps and the first real mountain pass of the Tour, the Col de la Colombière (16 km at 6.7%), lying 15 kilometres from the finish line.

Linus Gerdemann was in a 15-man break for much of the 197.5 km stage but the T-Mobile rider went it alone over the Col de la Colombière, finishing 40 seconds clear of Iñigo Landaluze, to take the yellow jersey from Fabian Cancellara.

Injured race favourites Alexander Vinokourov and Andreas Klöden finished in a group 3'38" behind, as did fellow big names Cadel Evans, Alejandro Valverde and Levi Leipheimer.

Stage 7 result

Rank	Rider	Team	Time
1	Linus Gerdemann (GER)	T-Mobile Team	4h 53' 13"
2	Iñigo Landaluze (ESP)	Euskaltel–Euskadi	+ 40"
3	David de la Fuente (ESP)	Saunier Duval–Prodir	+ 1' 39"
4	Mauricio Soler (COL)	Barloworld	+ 2' 14"
5	Laurent Lefèvre (FRA)	Bouygues Télécom	+ 2' 21"
6	Fabian Wegmann (GER)	Gerolsteiner	+ 3' 32"
7	Juan Manuel Gárate (ESP)	Quick-Step–Innergetic	+ 3' 38"
8	Xavier Florencio (ESP)	Bouygues Télécom	+ 3' 38"
9	Christophe Moreau (FRA)	AG2R Prévoyance	+ 3' 38"
10	Alejandro Valverde (ESP)	Caisse d'Epargne	+ 3' 38"

General classification after stage 7

Rank	Rider	Team	Time
1	Linus Gerdemann (GER)	T-Mobile Team	34h 43' 40"
2	Iñigo Landaluze (ESP)	Euskaltel–Euskadi	+ 1' 24"
3	David de la Fuente (ESP)	Saunier Duval–Prodir	+ 2' 45"
4	Laurent Lefèvre (FRA)	Bouygues Télécom	+ 2' 55"
5	Mauricio Soler (COL)	Barloworld	+ 3' 05"
6	Andreas Klöden (GER)	Astana	+ 3' 39"
7	Vladimir Gusev (RUS)	Discovery Channel	+ 3' 51"
8	Vladimir Karpets (RUS)	Caisse d'Epargne	+ 3' 52"
9	Mikel Astarloza (ESP)	Euskaltel–Euskadi	+ 3' 55"
10	Thomas Dekker (NED)	Rabobank	+ 3' 57"

== Stage 8 ==
2007-07-15 — Le Grand-Bornand – Tignes, 165 km

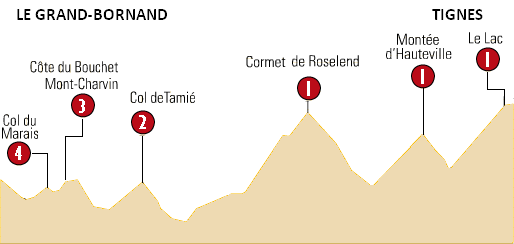
Stage 8 layout.

This was the shortest road stage, but was very tough. The climbing started from the outset, with two small climbs in the first 25 km before, from 75 kilometres out, tackling the Cormet de Roselend (19 km at 6%), the Montée d'Hauteville – the start of the Col du Petit Saint-Bernard – and the climb up to Tignes (18 km at 5.5%) for a very difficult finish at a height of 2068 m.

Denmark's Michael Rasmussen went it alone for victory in Tignes to secure the Tour de France Yellow jersey. Rasmussen, who began the day 39th overall, was part of a breakaway halfway through the 165 km eighth stage. He went solo on the last climb to finish two minutes and 47 seconds ahead of Iban Mayo and 5:04 clear of Linus Gerdemann, now second overall.

Alexander Vinokourov and Andreas Klöden both lost 4:29 while Michael Rogers crashed out of the race. T-Mobile leader Rogers was in the same group as Rasmussen – and the race leader on the road – on the descent of the Cormet de Roselend when he hit a roadside barrier. He bravely carried on before being forced to pull up later with a dislocated shoulder.

Levi Leipheimer sustained a ten-second penalty for slipstreaming behind his team car after sustaining a mechanical issue which necessitated a bike change. Had this not occurred, Leipheimer would have finished 2nd overall in the general classification, 2 seconds in front of Cadel Evans.

Stage 8 result

Rank	Rider	Team	Time
1	Michael Rasmussen (DEN)	Rabobank	4h 49' 40"
2	Iban Mayo (ESP)	Saunier Duval–Prodir	+ 2' 47"
3	Alejandro Valverde (ESP)	Caisse d'Epargne	+ 3' 12"
4	Christophe Moreau (FRA)	AG2R Prévoyance	+ 3' 13"
5	Fränk Schleck (LUX)	Team CSC	+ 3' 13"
6	Cadel Evans (AUS)	Predictor–Lotto	+ 3' 13"
7	Andrey Kashechkin (KAZ)	Astana	+ 3' 13"
8	Alberto Contador (ESP)	Discovery Channel	+ 3' 31"
9	Denis Menchov (RUS)	Rabobank	+ 3' 35"
10	Carlos Sastre (ESP)	Team CSC	+ 3' 35"

General Classification After Stage 8

Rank	Rider	Team	Time
1	Michael Rasmussen (DEN)	Rabobank	39h 37' 42"
2	Linus Gerdemann (GER)	T-Mobile Team	+ 43"
3	Iban Mayo (ESP)	Saunier Duval–Prodir	+ 2' 39"
4	Alejandro Valverde (ESP)	Caisse d'Epargne	+ 2' 51"
5	Andrey Kashechkin (KAZ)	Astana	+ 2' 52"
6	Cadel Evans (AUS)	Predictor–Lotto	+ 2' 53"
7	Christophe Moreau (FRA)	AG2R Prévoyance	+ 3' 06"
8	Alberto Contador (ESP)	Discovery Channel	+ 3' 10"
9	Fränk Schleck (LUX)	Team CSC	+ 3' 14"
10	Denis Menchov (RUS)	Rabobank	+ 3' 19"

== Stage 9 ==
2007-07-17 — Val-d'Isère – Briançon, 159.5 km

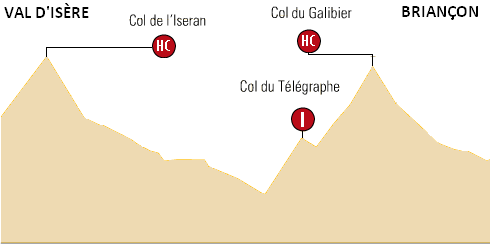
Stage 9 layout.

The riders made a cold start to the hors catégorie climb up to the Col de l'Iseran (15 km at 6%), followed by the Col du Télégraphe and the Col du Galibier (12 km at 6.7% and 17.5 km at 7%) with a 37 km downhill finish in Briançon.

After joining with a breakaway, Colombian Mauricio Soler made a strong move over the Col du Télégraphe, and stayed away through the descent of the Col du Galibier to claim the first-ever Tour de France stage win for the wild-card Barloworld team.

Speculation ensued after the race, as Alberto Contador had a flat tire while chasing Soler. Many believed that he would have caught Soler had this not happened.

Stage 9 result

Rank	Rider	Team	Time
1	Mauricio Soler (COL)	Barloworld	4h 14' 24"
2	Alejandro Valverde (ESP)	Caisse d'Epargne	+ 38"
3	Cadel Evans (AUS)	Predictor–Lotto	+ 38"
4	Alberto Contador (ESP)	Discovery Channel	+ 40"
5	Iban Mayo (ESP)	Saunier Duval–Prodir	+ 42"
6	Michael Rasmussen (DEN)	Rabobank	+ 42"
DSQ	~~Levi Leipheimer (USA)~~	~~Discovery Channel~~	~~+ 42"~~
7	Kim Kirchen (LUX)	T-Mobile Team	+ 46"
8	Andreas Klöden (GER)	Astana	+ 46"
9	Carlos Sastre (ESP)	Team CSC	+ 46"

General Classification After Stage 9

Rank	Rider	Team	Time
1	Michael Rasmussen (DEN)	Rabobank	43h 52' 48"
2	Alejandro Valverde (ESP)	Caisse d'Epargne	+ 2' 35"
3	Iban Mayo (ESP)	Saunier Duval–Prodir	+ 2' 39"
4	Cadel Evans (AUS)	Predictor–Lotto	+ 2' 41"
5	Alberto Contador (ESP)	Discovery Channel	+ 3' 08"
6	Christophe Moreau (FRA)	AG2R Prévoyance	+ 3' 18"
7	Carlos Sastre (ESP)	Team CSC	+ 3' 39"
8	Andreas Klöden (GER)	Astana	+ 3' 50"
9	~~Levi Leipheimer (USA)~~	~~Discovery Channel~~	~~+ 3' 53"~~
10	Kim Kirchen (LUX)	T-Mobile Team	+ 5' 06"

== Stage 10 ==
2007-07-18 — Tallard – Marseille, 229.5 km

This was a long, mostly downhill stage finishing in Marseille. While most expected a group sprint, a five-man breakaway survived to the end, with Cédric Vasseur winning in the small sprint.

Stage 10 result

Rank	Rider	Team	Time
1	Cédric Vasseur (FRA)	Quick-Step–Innergetic	5h 20' 24"
2	Sandy Casar (FRA)	Française des Jeux	s.t.
3	Michael Albasini (SUI)	Liquigas	s.t.
4	Patrice Halgand (FRA)	Crédit Agricole	s.t.
5	Jens Voigt (GER)	Team CSC	s.t.
6	Staf Scheirlinckx (BEL)	Cofidis	+ 36"
7	Paolo Bossoni (ITA)	Lampre–Fondital	+ 36"
8	Marcus Burghardt (GER)	T-Mobile Team	+ 1' 01"
9	Aleksandr Kuschynski (BLR)	Liquigas	+ 2' 34"
10	Juan Antonio Flecha (ESP)	Rabobank	+ 2' 34"

General classification after stage 10

Rank	Rider	Team	Time
1	Michael Rasmussen (DEN)	Rabobank	49h 23' 48"
2	Alejandro Valverde (ESP)	Caisse d'Epargne	+ 2' 35"
3	Iban Mayo (ESP)	Saunier Duval–Prodir	+ 2' 39"
4	Cadel Evans (AUS)	Predictor–Lotto	+ 2' 41"
5	Alberto Contador (ESP)	Discovery Channel	+ 3' 08"
6	Christophe Moreau (FRA)	AG2R Prévoyance	+ 3' 18"
7	Carlos Sastre (ESP)	Team CSC	+ 3' 39"
8	Andreas Klöden (GER)	Astana	+ 3' 50"
9	~~Levi Leipheimer (USA)~~	~~Discovery Channel~~	~~+ 3' 53"~~
10	Kim Kirchen (LUX)	T-Mobile Team	+ 5' 06"
