= Montvalezan =

- Commune
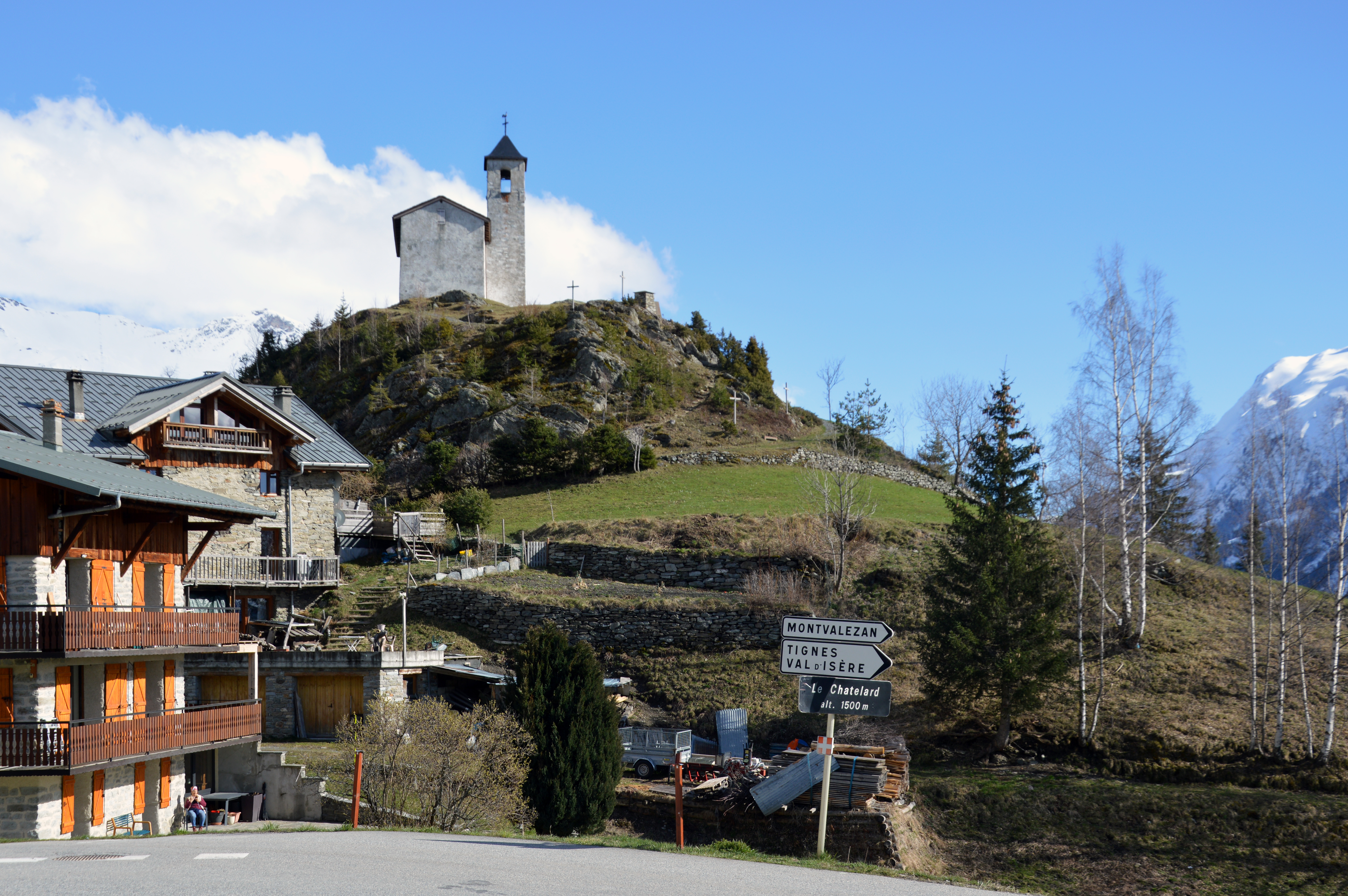
- Le Châtelard, one of the hamlets in Montvalezan
- Location of Montvalezan
- Location within France Location within Auvergne-Rhône-Alpes
- Coordinates: 45°36′45″N 6°50′50″E
- Country: France
- Region: Auvergne-Rhône-Alpes
- Department: Savoie
- Arrondissement: Albertville
- Canton: Bourg-Saint-Maurice
- Intercommunality: Haute Tarentaise

Government
  - Mayor (2020–2026): Jean-Claude Fraissard
- Area^{1}: 25.9 km^{2} (10.0 sq mi)
- Highest elevation: 2,939 m (9,642 ft)
- Lowest elevation: 860 m (2,820 ft)
- Population (2023): 734
  - Density: 28.3/km^{2} (73.4/sq mi)
- Time zone: UTC+01:00 (CET)
  - Summer (DST): UTC+02:00 (CEST)
- INSEE/Postal code: 73176 /73700
- ^{1} French Land Register data, which excludes lakes, ponds, glaciers > 1 km^{2} (0.386 sq mi or 247 acres) and river estuaries.

Montvalezan (French pronunciation: [mɔ̃valzɑ̃]; Arpitan: Molèzan) is a commune in the Savoie department in the Auvergne-Rhône-Alpes region in south-eastern France. As of 2023, the population of the commune was 734.

Montvalezan is best known for containing La Rosière ski resort. It is located in the Tarentaise Valley, on the road of Little St Bernard Pass.

== See also ==
- Communes of the Savoie department
