= La Rosière, Savoie =

Ski resort in southeastern France

La Rosière
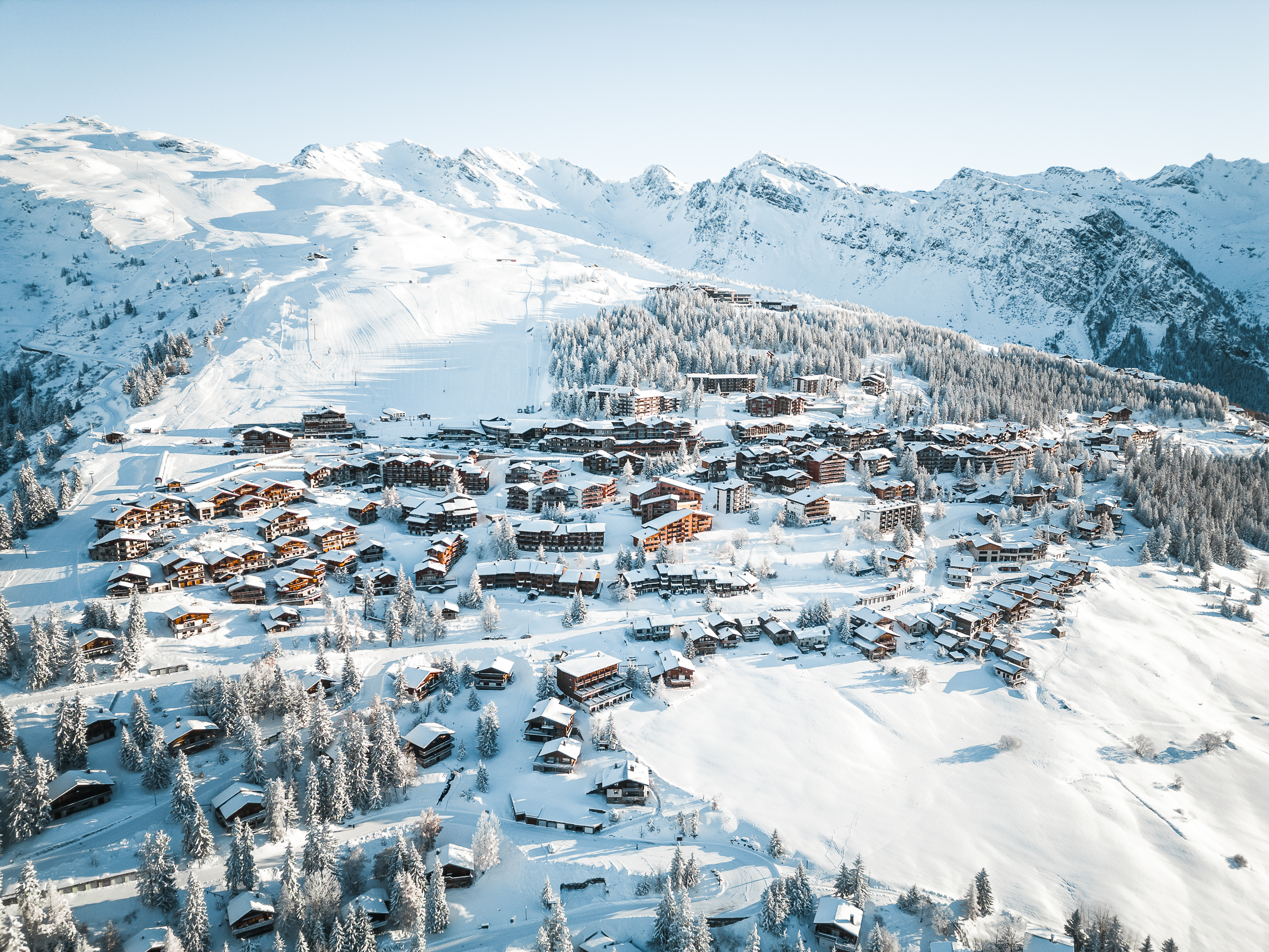
- Aerial view of La Rosière
- Interactive map of La Rosière
- Location: Montvalezan, Auvergne-Rhône-Alpes, France
- Nearest city: Bourg-Saint-Maurice
- Coordinates: 45.62878°N 6.84793°E
- Top elevation: 2,800 m (9,200 ft)
- Base elevation: 1,850 m (6,070 ft)
- Skiable area: 156 km (97 mi) of pistes
- Trails: 82
- Lift system: 38 (1 gondola, 21 chairlifts, 11 drag lifts, 5 magic carpets)
- Website: https://www.larosiere.net

Additional ski area information
Trail difficulty	14 black, 35 red, 25 blue, 8 green
Snowparks	2
Cross-country skiing	7 km (4.3 mi)
Linked resort	Espace San Bernardo – connected to La Thuile, Italy

La Rosière - Espace San Bernardo is a winter sports resort in the Tarentaise Valley, located in the commune of Montvalezan, in the department of Savoie in the Auvergne-Rhône-Alpes region. At 1,850 m (6,070 ft), it is built on a balcony site, facing south and offering a panorama of the valley. The ski area is linked to the large Franco-Italian area of Espace San Bernardo.

== Geography ==
=== Location ===
45.6272°N 6.849239°E La Rosière-Espace San Bernardo is located in the Tarentaise Valley at the foot of the Petit-Saint-Bernard Pass, in the department of Savoie. Its altitude varies from 1,850 m (6,070 ft) to 2,800 m (9,200 ft), with the resort-village itself situated at 1,850 m (6,070 ft), and its highest point being Mont Valaisan, at 2,891 m (9,485 ft). Its southern exposure and proximity to the Petit Saint Bernard Pass provide it with exceptional sunshine and snow conditions, allowing skiing in the spring.

=== Access ===
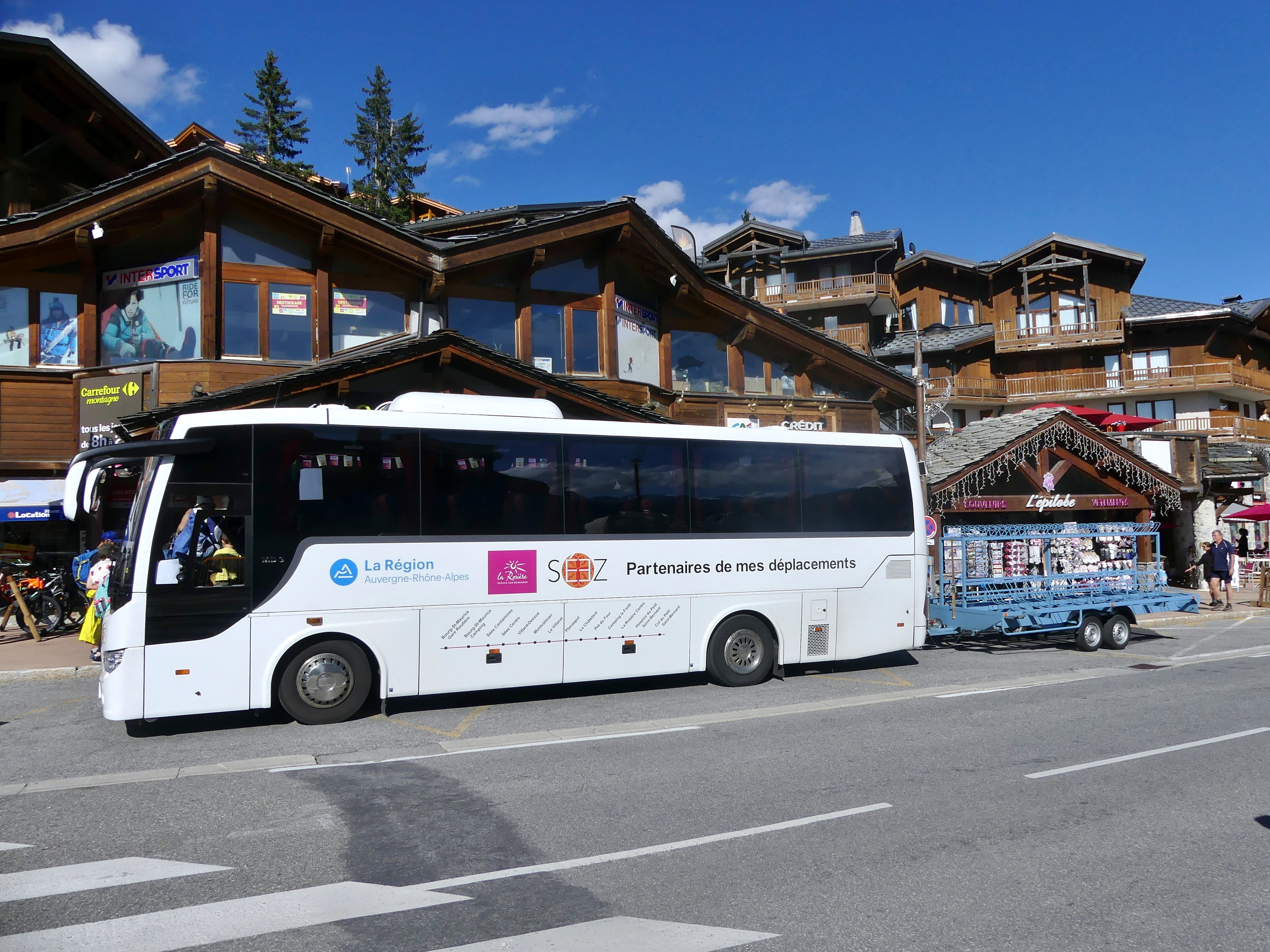
Summer shuttle arriving in La Rosière from Bourg-Saint-Maurice

By train: Bourg-Saint-Maurice station, the terminus from Lyon via Chambéry, Albertville, and Moûtiers. Several high-speed TGV trains arrive during the season, also serving the mountain resorts, including Les Arcs, Tignes, and Val d'Isère.
By road: the Route Nationale 90 in the Tarentaise Valley to Bourg-Saint-Maurice, then the RD 1090 which winds up from Séez towards the Petit-Saint-Bernard Pass. Note that this road is closed in winter from La Rosière onwards. In summer, access is via the pass road from Courmayeur and the Mont Blanc Tunnel or the Aosta Valley.

== Name ==
=== History ===
The old hamlet of alpine chalets was equipped with a ski lift, the La Poletta drag lift, on December 23, 1960.

The resort has been linked in winter, since 1984, with the Valdostan commune of La Thuile to form the international ski area of Ascendancy of Espace San Bernardo.

In January 2022, Gaspard Ulliel died there. He was the victim of a head trauma after a helmetless collision with another skier at the junction of two slopes.

== Gallery ==
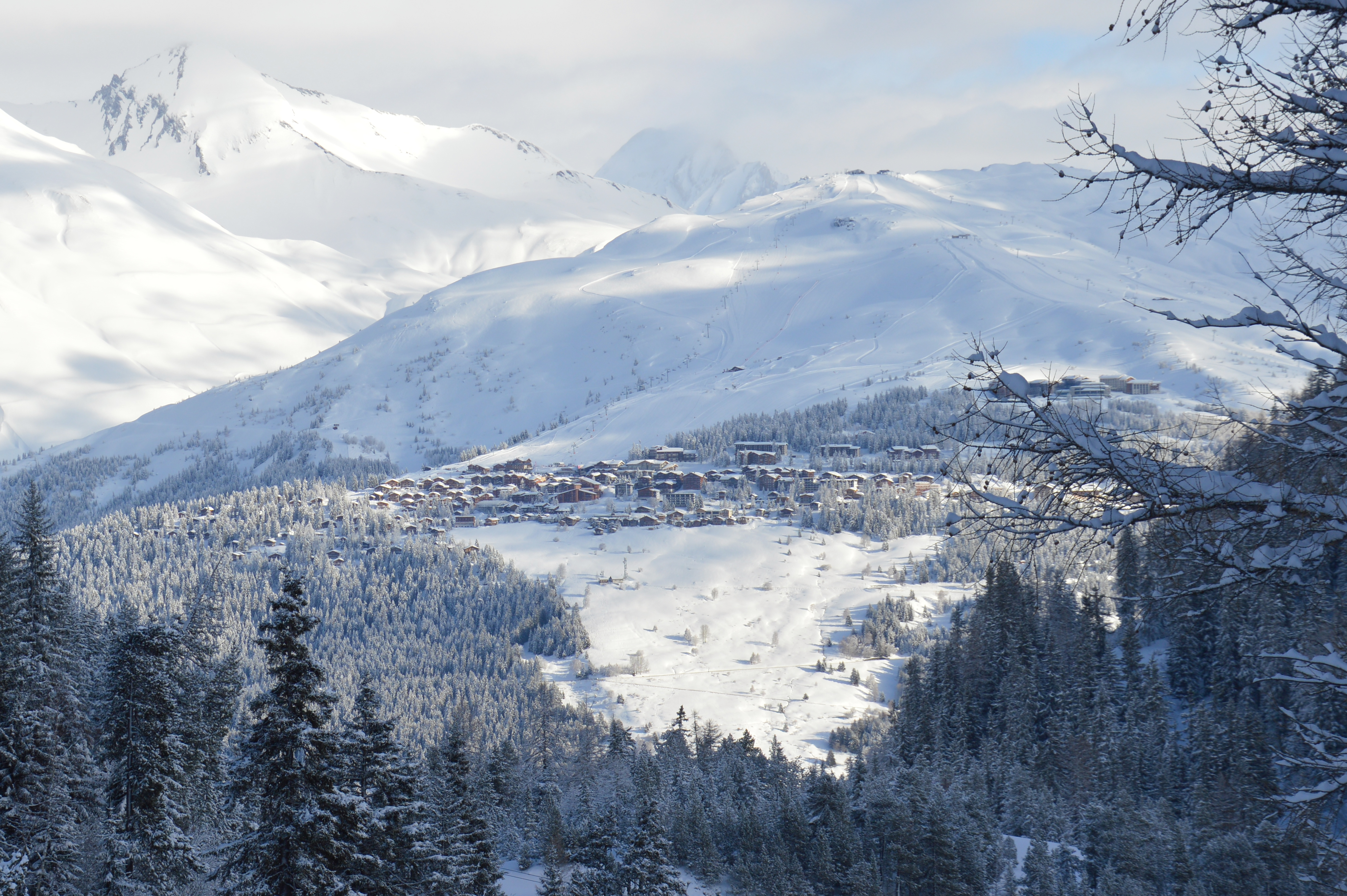
La Rosière in winter, view from Les Arcs

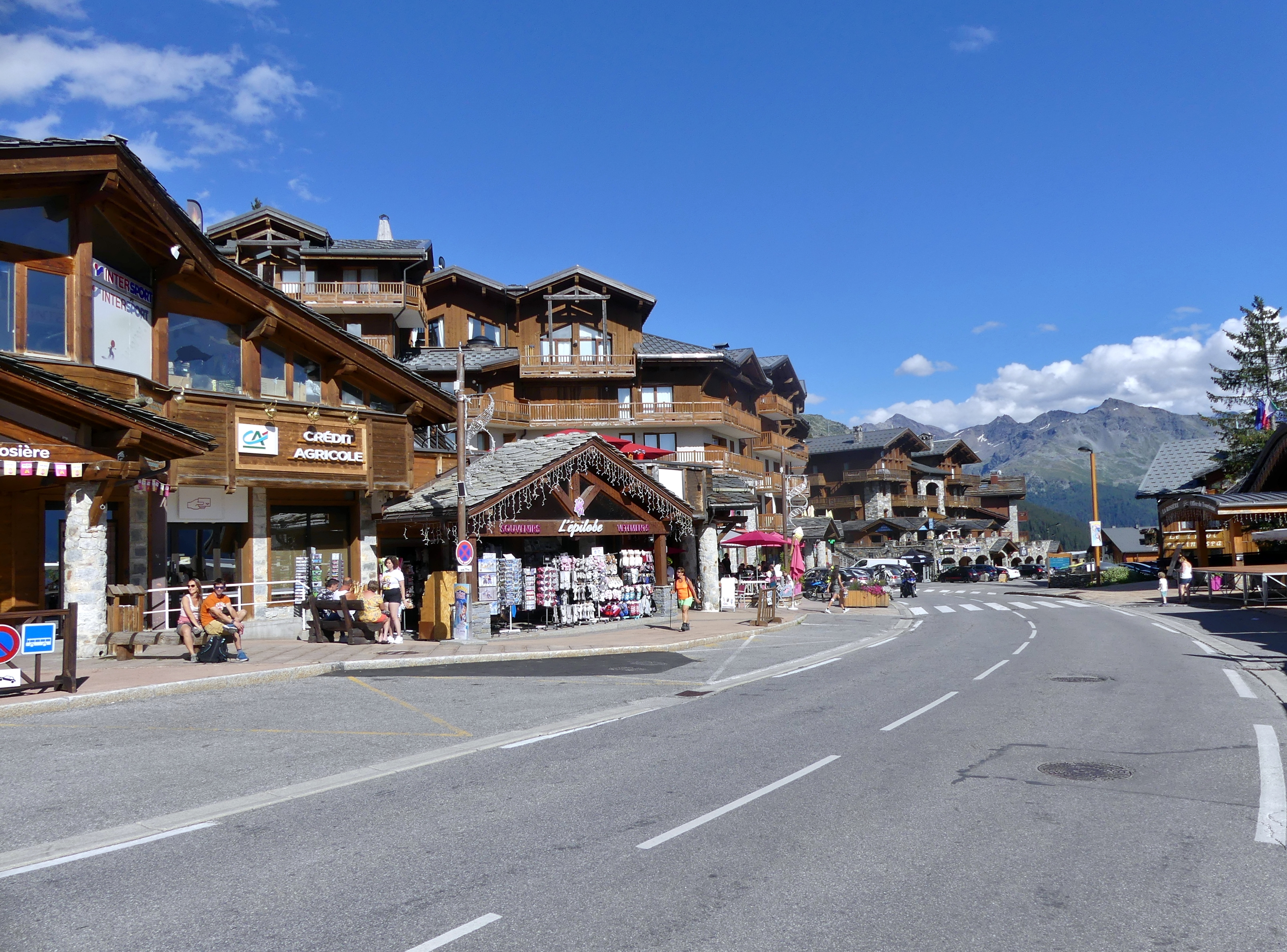
Main center of La Rosière in summer

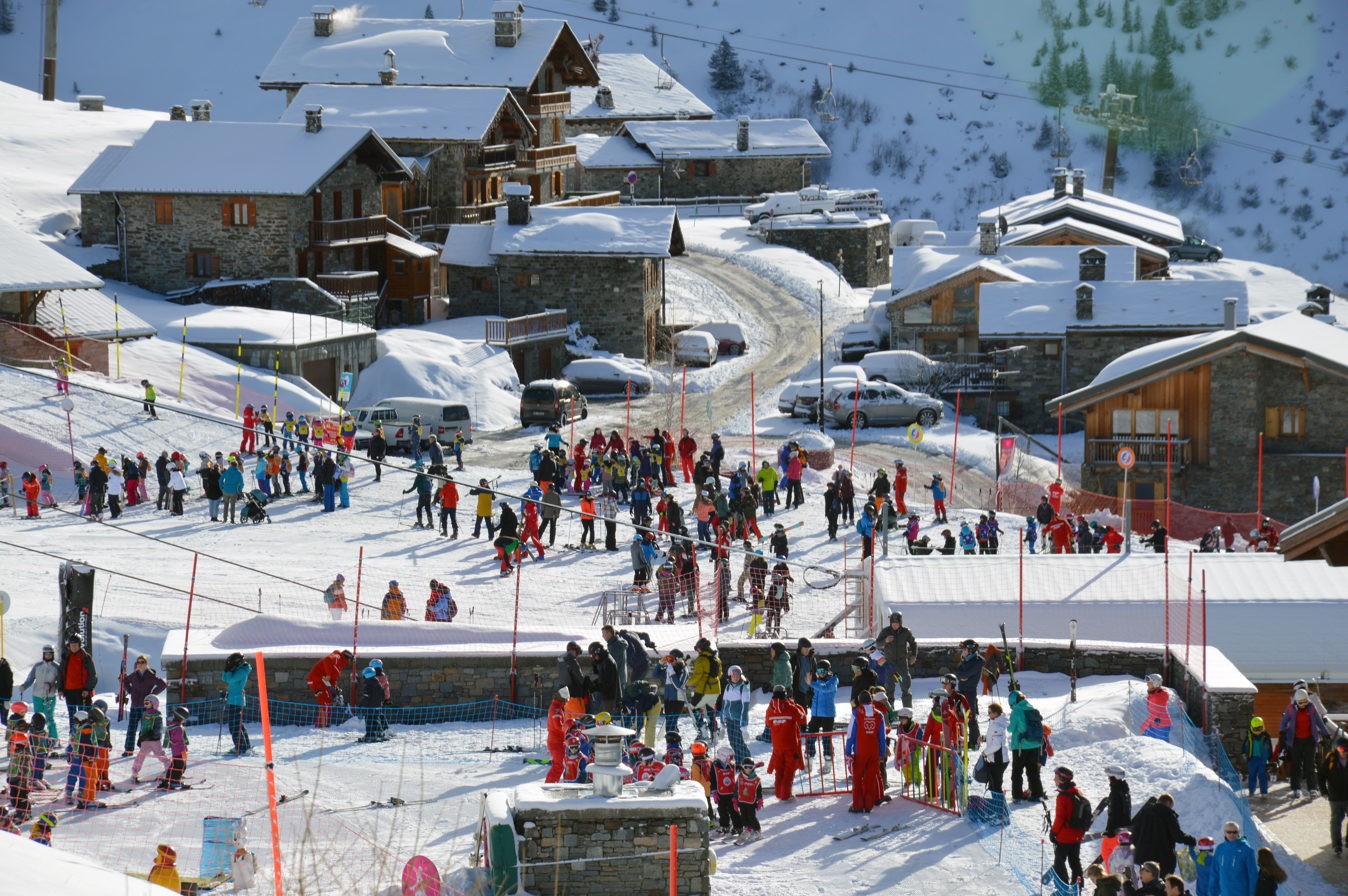
The snow front of Les Eucherts

=== Promotion ===
In 2021, the resort joined several labels: "Famille Plus"; "Villages de charme"; "Grand domaine"; "Étape de montagne".

The commune of La Rosière has been awarded the "ville fleurie" (flowering town) label with "two flowers" by the National Council of Towns and Villages in Bloom of France in the 2016 competition.

=== Town planning ===
The resort is one of the hamlets of Montvalezan and is relatively far from the main town.

Its architecture mainly features recent neo-Savoyard chalets clad in wood, alongside small cubic buildings constructed in the 1960s and 1970s, which are gradually being renovated. Wood, stone, and lauze (local stone slabs) form the foundations of traditional Savoyard architecture.

The resort is divided into two main areas: the center and Les Eucherts.

The center is composed of several districts, mainly consisting of small residences, with the exception of Gollet and Manessier, which are predominantly made up of chalets.

Les Eucherts is a more recent urban development next to some old chalets. The district consists of medium-sized buildings.

In 2019, urbanization extended above the resort, with the construction of a large building on the site of the former altiport.

Although located at a relatively high altitude, La Rosière has the particularity of having almost all of its slopes — with the exception of two — situated above the resort.

=== Accommodation and catering ===
In 2014, the resort's accommodation capacity, estimated by the Savoie-Mont-Blanc organization, was 10,546 tourist beds spread across 1,436 establishments. The accommodation is divided as follows: 531 furnished apartments, 15 tourist residences, 5 hotels, and one outdoor hospitality structure.

As of January 1, 2020, the resort has 12,000 tourist beds.

The commune's development plan foresees a maximum increase of 2,692 tourist beds between 2019 and 2026.

== Ski area and management ==
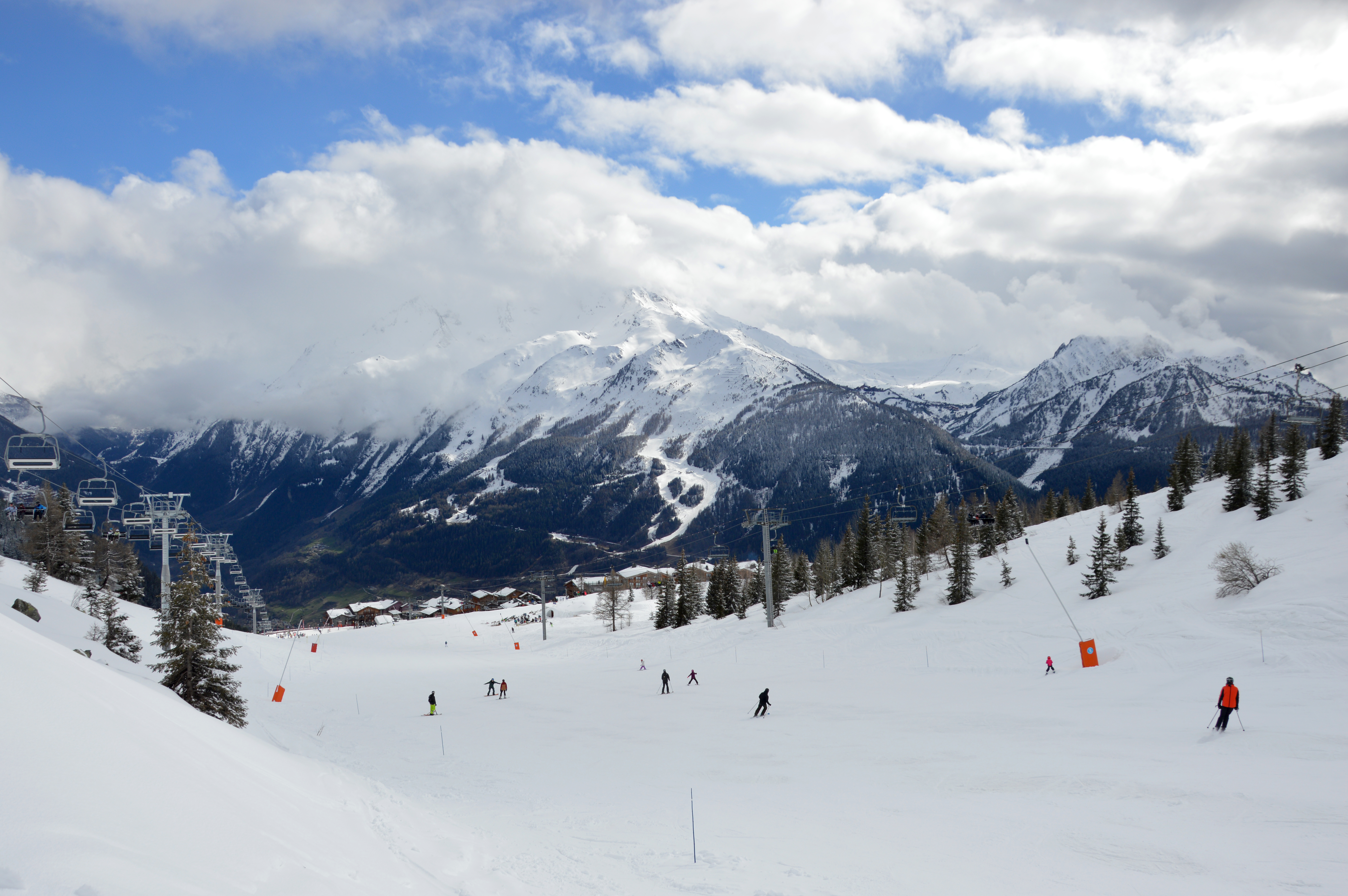
Slopes and ski lifts above Les Eucherts

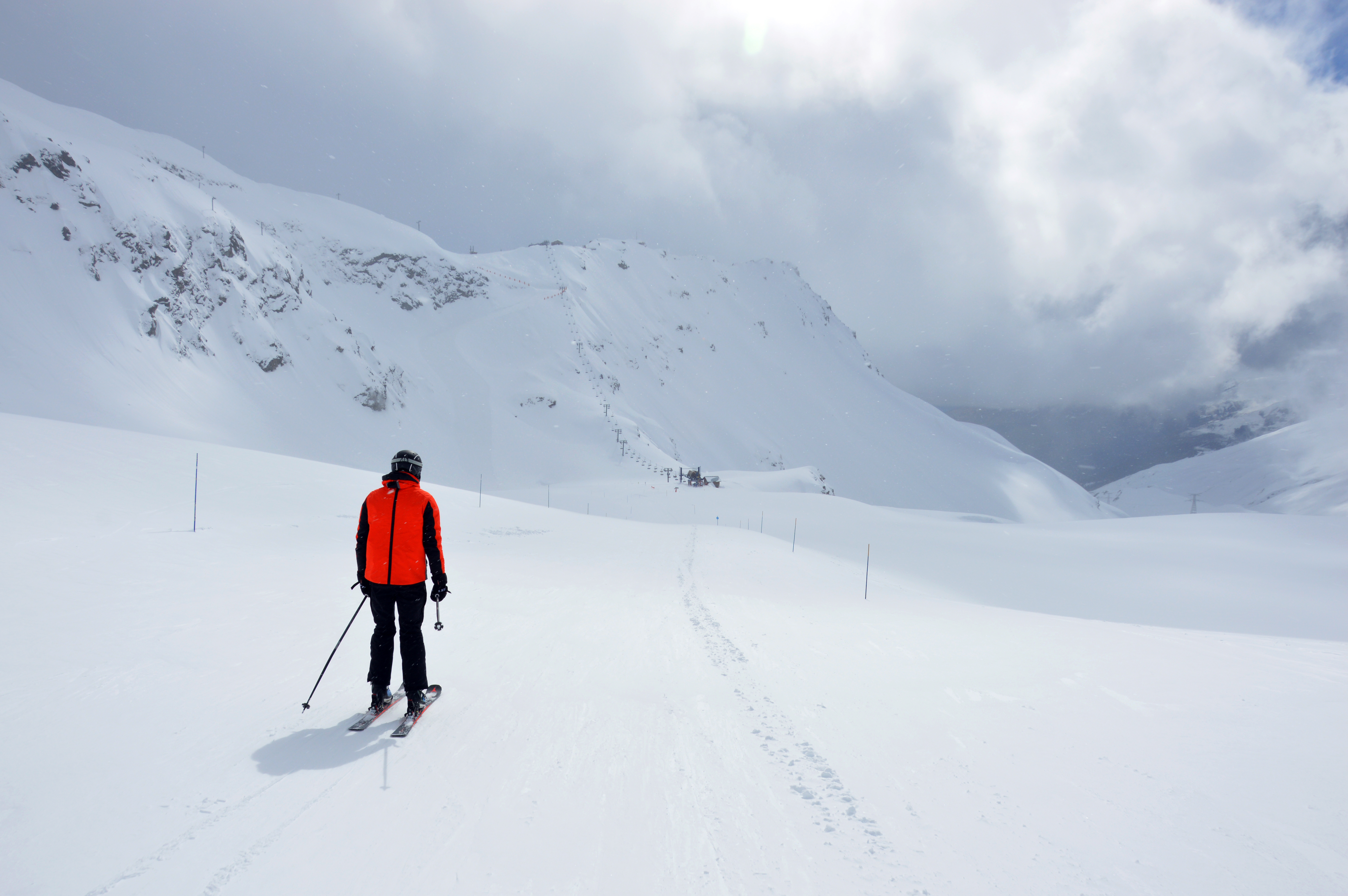
The Faisan slope is part of the ski link via the Petit-Saint-Bernard Pass, on the return from Italy

The resort is linked by ski lifts to the Italian and Valdostan commune of La Thuile, via the Petit-Saint-Bernard Pass, by the Chardonnet chairlift and the Bellecombe drag lift on the French side, and the Belvédère chairlift on the Valdostan side.

This link opens up a common ski area for skiers — the Espace San Bernardo — of 3,000 hectares.

The latest extension of the area dates from December 2018, with the opening of 2 new ski lifts, allowing access to the maximum altitude of 2,800 m (9,200 ft) on Mont Valaisan.

The La Rosière area is managed under a public service delegation by DSR, of which Sofival holds 80% and Compagnie des Alpes 20%.

== Sports and leisure ==
=== Winter sports ===
The Espace San Bernardo has 154 km (96 mi) of alpine ski slopes (excluding cross-country ski trails, sledding areas, and permanent ski touring routes) since the opening of Mont-Valaisan, ranking it 13th among the largest ski areas in France and 34th worldwide. Marcel Dix-neuf, an executive at Peugeot and a property owner in La Rosière, organized the Esso-Peugeot Trophy in La Rosière for several years.

=== Cycling ===
La Rosière-Montvalezan (1,847 m (6,060 ft)) served as the finish line for the 6th stage of the Tour de l'Avenir 2014, a rather short stage of 108 km (67 mi). The ascent was classified as a first category climb. Colombian Miguel Ángel López, the race leader, won this stage ahead of Robert Power, his rival who was just behind him in the general classification. The Tour de l'Avenir 2015 returned there for the 5th stage, which saw the victory of Frenchman Guillaume Martin after a breakaway. In 2018, the Critérium du Dauphiné organized the finish of the 6th stage there, with the victory of Peio Bilbao ahead of the yellow jersey wearer Geraint Thomas. The 2018 Tour de France also arrived there during the 11th stage. Mikel Nieve, who had broken away, could not resist the return of Geraint Thomas, who won this stage twenty seconds ahead of his usual leader Christopher Froome and Tom Dumoulin. Geraint Thomas also took the yellow jersey.

== Culture and heritage ==
=== Heritage ===
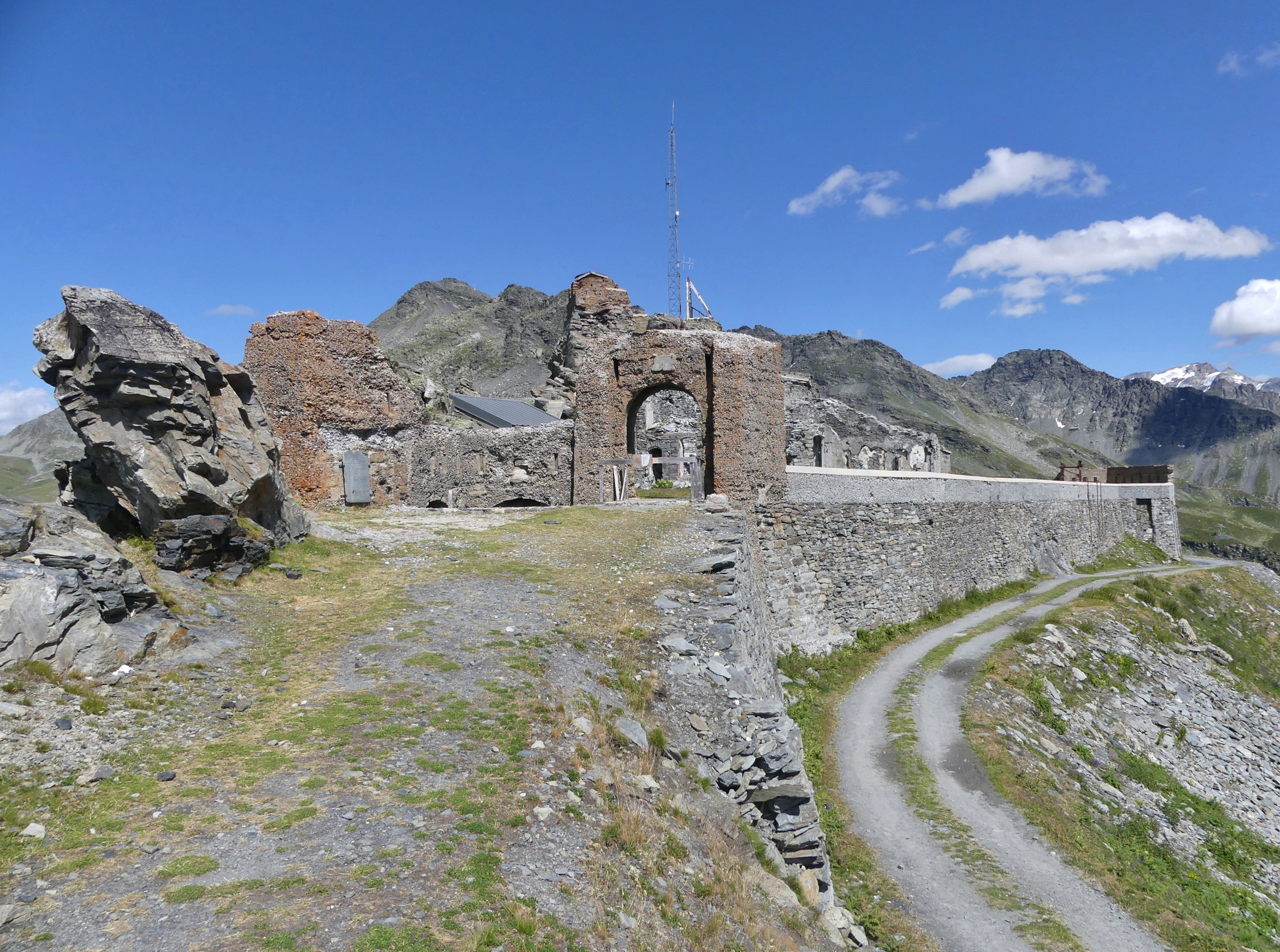
Fort de la Redoute Ruinée

- Fort de la Redoute Ruinée (Fort of the Ruined Redoubt)
- Chapelle Saint-Michel du Châtelard (Saint-Michel du Châtelard Chapel)
- Ruined Sardinian redoubt, between the fort and the summit of Mont Valaizan

== Related articles ==
- Sport in Savoie
- Tourism in Savoie
