= Col de l'Iseran =

Mountain pass in the French Alps

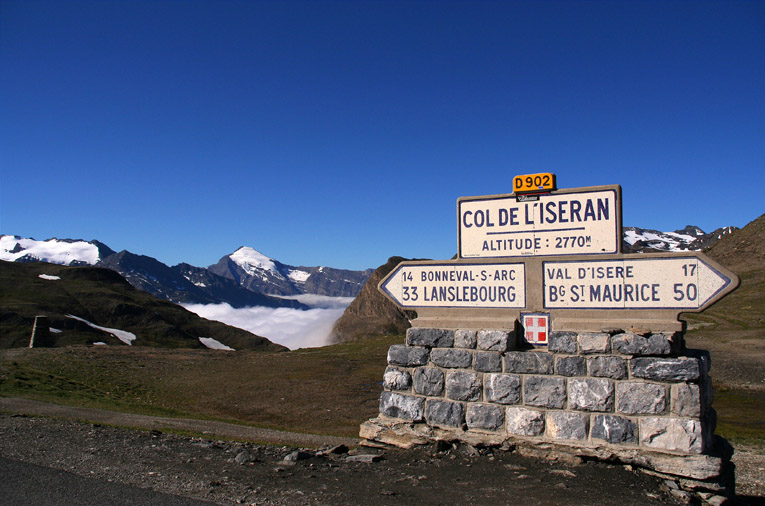
- Signpost at the Col de l'Iseran in 2006

- Location within Alps
- Elevation: 2,764 m (9,068 ft)
- Traversed by: D 902 road

Third Approach
- Location: Savoie, France
- Range: Graian Alps
- Coordinates: 45°25′1″N 07°01′51″E

Col de l'Iseran (el. 2,764 metres (9,068 ft)) is a mountain pass in France, the highest paved pass in the Alps. A part of the Graian Alps, it is in the department of Savoie, near the border with Italy, and is crossed by the D902 roadway.

The pass is part of the Route des Grandes Alpes. It connects the valley of the Isère (Tarentaise) and the valley of the Arc River (Maurienne) between Val-d'Isère in the north and Bonneval-sur-Arc in the south.

On the northern side is the popular Tignes – Val d'Isère ski resort. The pass is only accessible by road during the summer months. In the winter it can only be accessed by a series of pistes and ski lifts.

The Col is also accessible by off-road mountain paths and is the highest point both of the Alpine GR 5, a long-distance trail from Lake Geneva to Nice, and of the similar Grande Traversée des Alpes. The steep descent to the south, notable for its waterfalls, enters the Vanoise National Park here.

== Details of the climb ==
From the north the road goes up and down through short tunnels and avalanche galleries past the Lac du Chevril near Tignes. Starting from Bourg-Saint-Maurice, the climb to Col de l'Iseran is 48 km (30 mi). Over this distance, the road (D 902) ascends 1,955 m (6,414 ft), at an average grade of 4.1%. The last 15 km (9 mi) starts at Val-d'Isère and climbs 895 m (2,936 ft) at a consistent average of 6%.

From the south, the climb starts at Lanslebourg-Mont Cenis and is 32.9 km (20.4 mi) in length, ascending 1,371 m (4,498 ft) at an average grade of 4.2%. The final 13.4 km (8.3 mi) starts at Bonneval-sur-Arc and rises 977 m (3,205 ft) at an average gradient of 7.3%, with several sections in excess of 10%.

On both sides of the Col de l'Iseran, mountain pass cycling milestones mark the distance to the summit, the current altitude, and the average slope in the following kilometre.

Panorama of the Col de l'Iseran

== The Tour de France ==
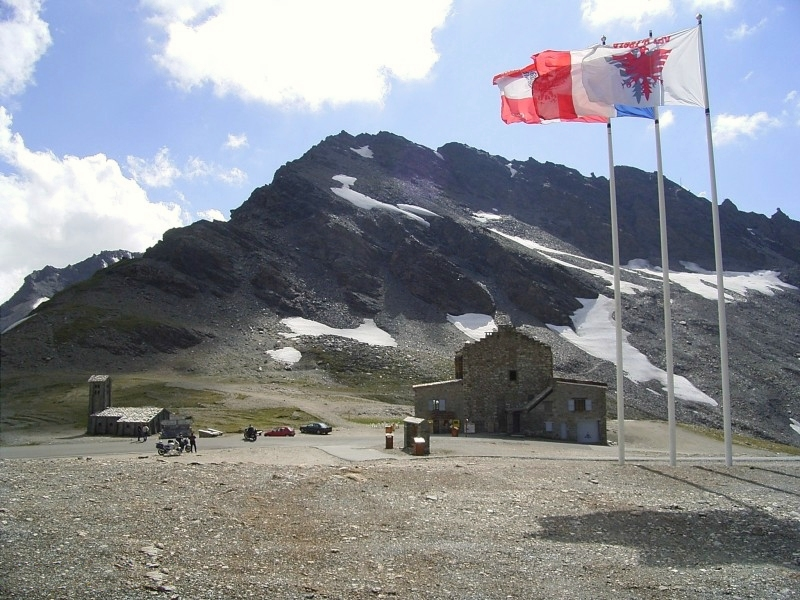
Wind-whipped flags at the summit in 2005

The Col d'Iseran was first used in the Tour de France bicycle race in 1938. The first rider over the summit was Felicien Vervaecke but on the descent he was passed by Gino Bartali. Bartali had taken the leader's yellow jersey from Vervaecke the previous day and retained it to the finish in Paris.

The first mountain time trial was introduced to the Tour in 1939. It went over the Col de l'Iseran from Bonneval-sur-Arc to Bourg-Saint-Maurice and was won by Sylvere Maes by four minutes.

The pass has been used five times on the Tour de France since 1947. It was scheduled to be used in 1996 but was left out at the last minute due to bad weather. As a result of snow on both the Col de l'Iseran and the Col du Galibier the scheduled 190 km (118 mi) stage from Val-d'Isère to Sestriere in Italy was truncated to a 46 km (29 mi) sprint from Le-Monetier-les-Bains. Bjarne Riis claimed the sprint, resulting in him taking the yellow jersey which he retained to the finish in Paris.

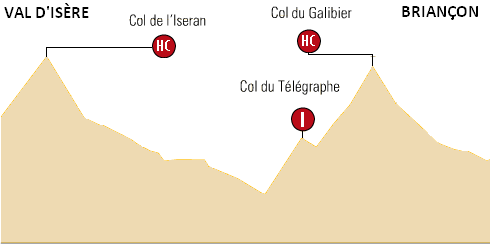
stage 9 in 2007

Col de l'Iseran was crossed in 2007 in stage 9, which started from Val-d'Isère and went 159.5 km (99 mi) to Briançon on 17 July. The Tour crossed the climb once again in the 2019 edition, in Stage 19 to Tignes. However, due to adverse weather conditions on the ascent to Tignes, the stage was truncated with times for the general classification being taken at the summit of the Col de l'Iseran.

=== Appearances in Tour de France ===
Year	Stage	Category	Start	Finish	Leader at the summit
2019	19	HC, SHD	Saint-Jean-de-Maurienne	~~Tignes~~ Col de l'Iseran	Egan Bernal (COL)
2007	9	HC	Val-d'Isère	Briançon	Yaroslav Popovych (UKR)
1992	13	HC	Saint-Gervais	Sestriere	Claudio Chiappucci (ITA)
1963	16	1	Grenoble	Val-d'Isère	Fernando Manzaneque (ESP)
1959	18	1	Le Lautaret	Saint-Vincent	Adolf Christian (AUT)
1949	17	1	Briançon	Aosta	Giuseppe Tacca (FRA)
1939	16b	ITT	Bonneval	Bourg-Saint-Maurice	Sylvère Maes (BEL)
1938	15		Briançon	Aix-les-Bains	Félicien Vervaecke (BEL)
