= Route des Grandes Alpes =

Tourist itinerary through the French Alps

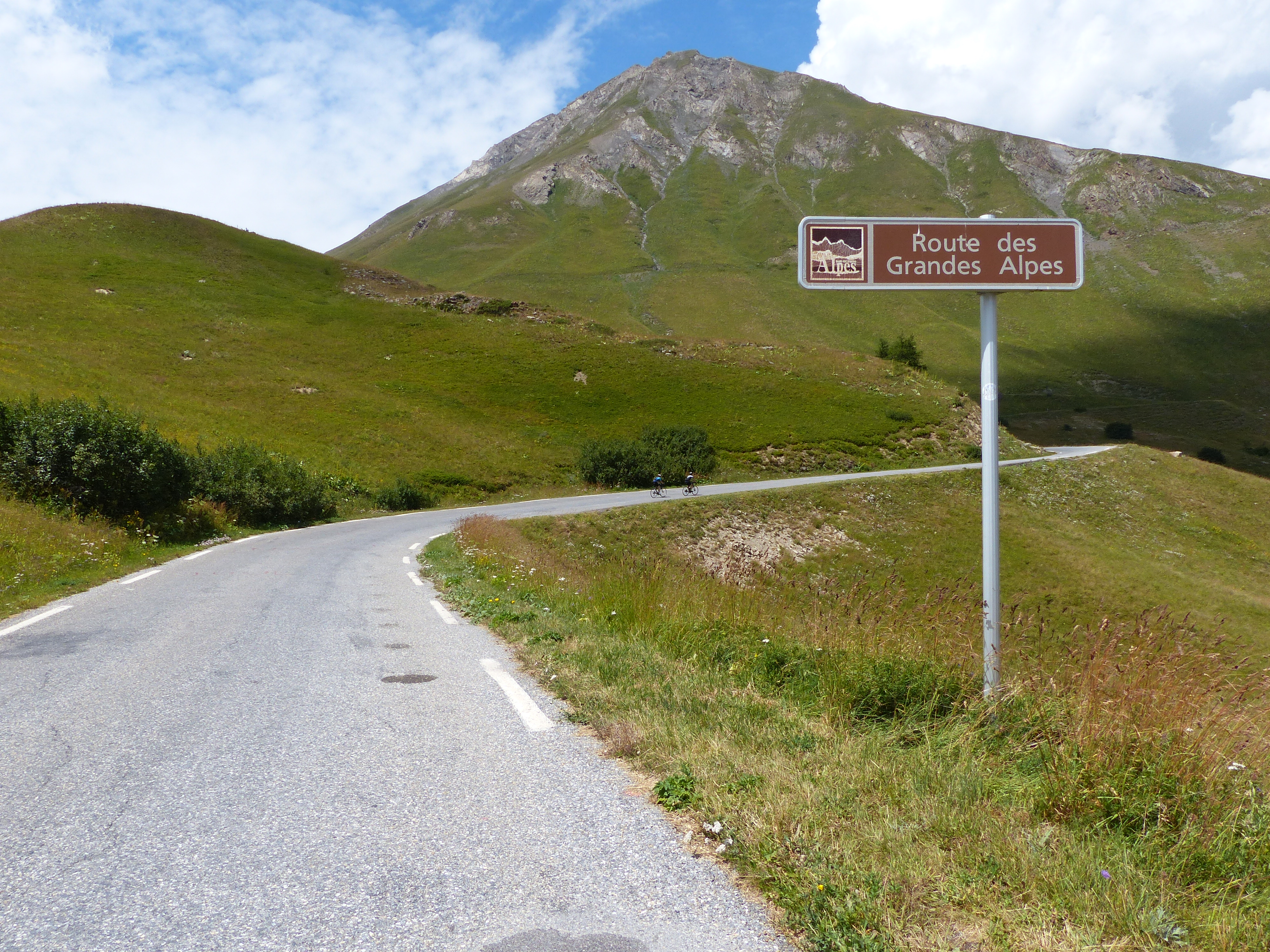
The Route des Grandes Alpes at the Col du Lautaret, towards the Col du Galibier.

The Route des Grandes Alpes (RdGA) is a tourist itinerary through the French Alps between Lake Geneva and the French Riviera climbing all the high Alpine passes within France.

This true classic trip is 720 km (447 mi) long. The construction of this scenic route started in 1909 and was opened in 1913. In that period the Alps were still an isolated region of France with poor access possibilities. In 1937 it was totally paved. It was renamed “Route des Grandes Alpes” in 1950. The journey starts at Thonon-les-Bains and climbs via Les Gets and Cluses. It then heads to Saint-Gervais and Megève, over the Col des Saisies (1,633 m (5,358 ft)). It then passes through Beaufort, Bourg-Saint-Maurice and onto Val-d'Isère. The road then crosses the Col de l'Iseran (2,770 m (9,090 ft)).

The road then passes through Modane and over the Col du Galibier (2,642 m (8,668 ft)) and then the Col du Lautaret (2,058 m (6,752 ft)) to La Grave. The road heads to Briançon and then over the Col d'Izoard (2,361 m (7,746 ft)). The road then heads through Embrun and over the Col de Vars (2,111 m (6,926 ft)) and onto Barcelonnette via Jausiers, where the choice can be made to turn south over the Col de la Bonette (2,802 m (9,193 ft))—with access to the highest paved through road in Europe, the Cime de la Bonette—or continue via the Col de la Cayolle (2,327 m (7,635 ft)).

The official end of the modern day RdGA cycling route switched in 2012 from Menton to Nice adding a further 37 km and bringing the addition of the Col d'Èze (507 m (1,663 ft)), reached via the cols of Saint-Martin (1,500 m (4,900 ft)), Turini (1,607 m (5,272 ft)) and Castillon (728 m (2,388 ft)). The route traditionally ends for motorised vehicles in Menton.

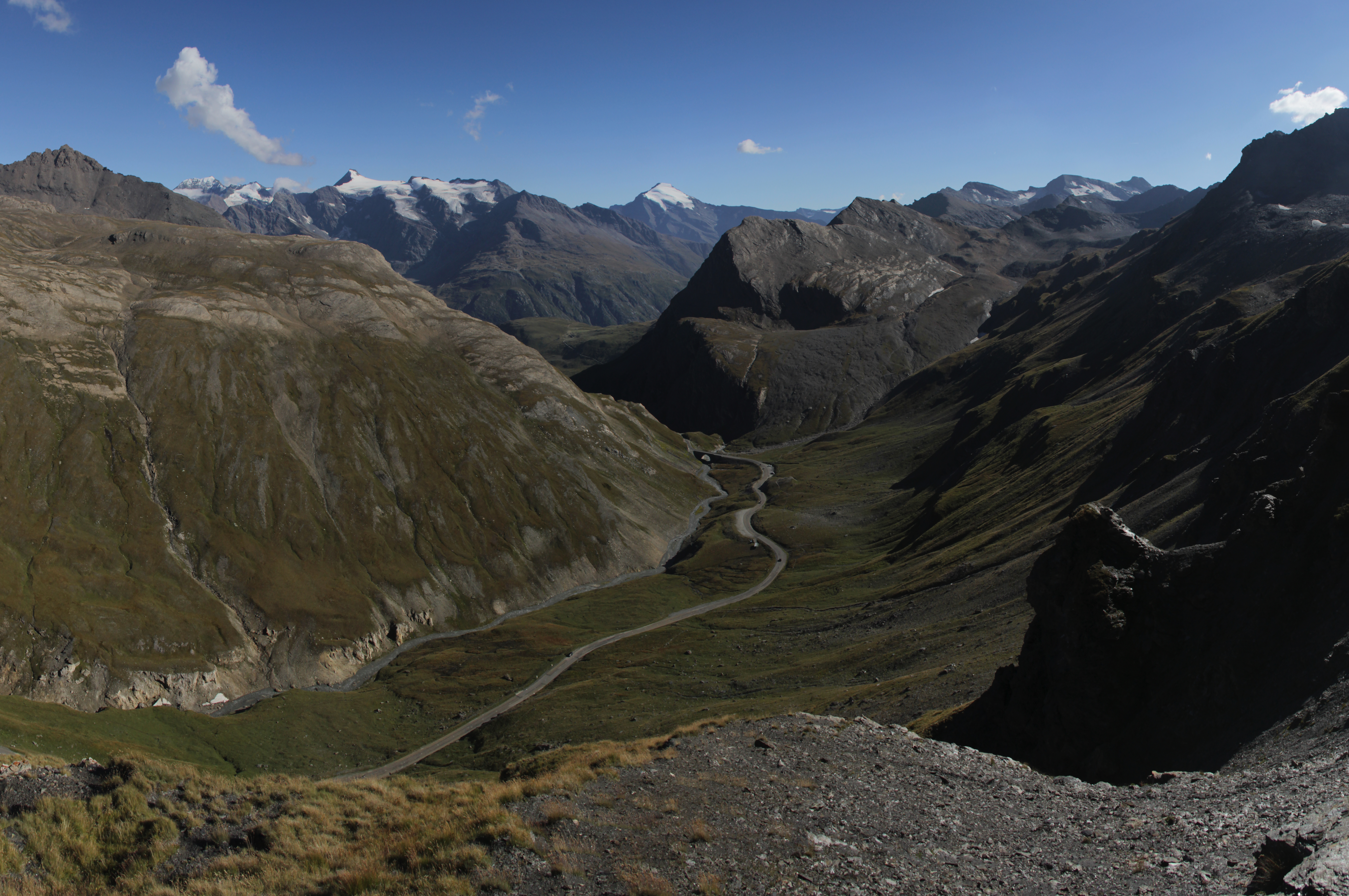
At an altitude of 2,764 meters, the Col de l'Iseran (view to the south from the summit) is crossed by the Route des Grandes Alpes; it is the highest paved pass in the Alps.

Set high in the French Alps, this journey enjoys legendary status. It tops out at 2,802 m (9,193 ft) above sea level. The route is totally open between June (after the snow has melted) and October. Most of the passes are open at the end of May. But the highest ones – Iseran, Galibier and Izoard – are clear only after mid-June, at the earliest. The highest mountain passes generally close when the first snows arrive.

Col des Gets (1163 m)

Col de la Colombière (1613 m)

Col des Aravis (1487 m)

Col des Saisies (1650 m)

Cormet de Roselend (1967 m)

Col de l’Iseran (2764 m)

Col du Télégraphe (1566 m)

Col du Galibier (2645 m)

Col du Lautaret (2058 m)

Col d’Izoard (2360 m)

Col de Vars (2109 m)

Col de la Cayolle (2326 m)

Col de Valberg (1673 m)

Col de la Couillole (1678 m)

Col Saint-Martin (1500 m)

Col de Turini (1607 m)

Col de Castillon (728 m)

Col d’Èze (507 m)
