= Montée d'Hauteville =

Mountain climb that was used in the 2007 Tour de France

- Interactive map of Montée d'Hauteville
- Elevation: 1,639 metres (5,377 ft)
- Traversed by: N 90

Third Approach
- Location: Savoie, France
- Range: Alps
- Coordinates: 45°37′19″N 6°50′43″E

Montée d'Hauteville (1639 m.) is a mountain climb that was used in the 2007 Tour de France. The race caravan covered the first 15.3 km of the climb from Bourg-Saint-Maurice to the Little St Bernard Pass on the N. 90 border route to Courmayeur in Italy.

== Details of climb ==
From Bourg-Saint-Maurice to the south-west, the climb is 15.5 km long. Over this distance, the climb is 799 m. (an average percentage of 5.1%), with the steepest sections at 8.1% at the start of the climb. The descent is by minor roads to join the D902 at Sainte-Foy-Tarentaise.

== Appearances in Tour de France ==
In 2007, Montée d'Hauteville was climbed on stage 8 of the Tour de France.

Year	Stage	Category	Start	Finish	Leader at the summit
2007	8	1	Le Grand Bornand	Tignes	Michael Rasmussen (DEN)

== See also ==
- List of highest paved roads in Europe
- List of mountain passes
