= Little St Bernard Pass =

Mountain pass in the Alps on the France–Italy border

Little St. Bernard Pass
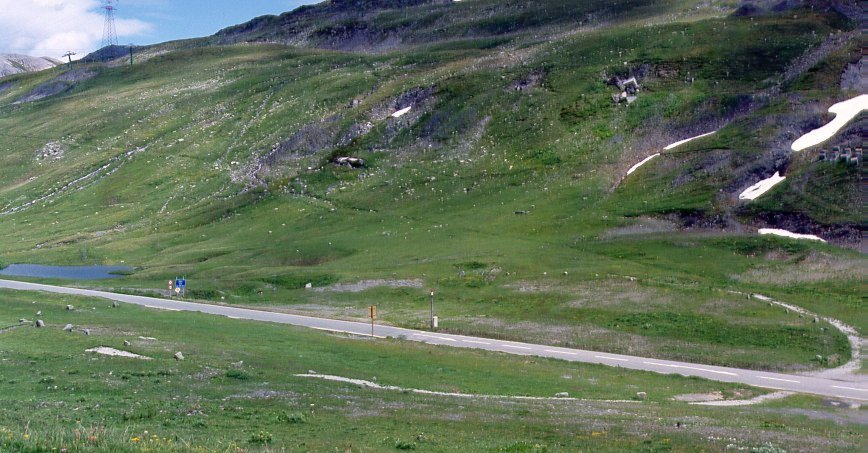
- View of the stone circle crossed diagonally by the road. Remains of World War II fortifications are also visible.

- Location within Alps
- Elevation: 2,188 metres (7,178 ft)
- Traversed by: N 90/SS26

Third Approach
- Location: Rhône-Alpes, France; Aosta Valley, Italy
- Range: Alps
- Coordinates: 45°40′49″N 06°53′02″E

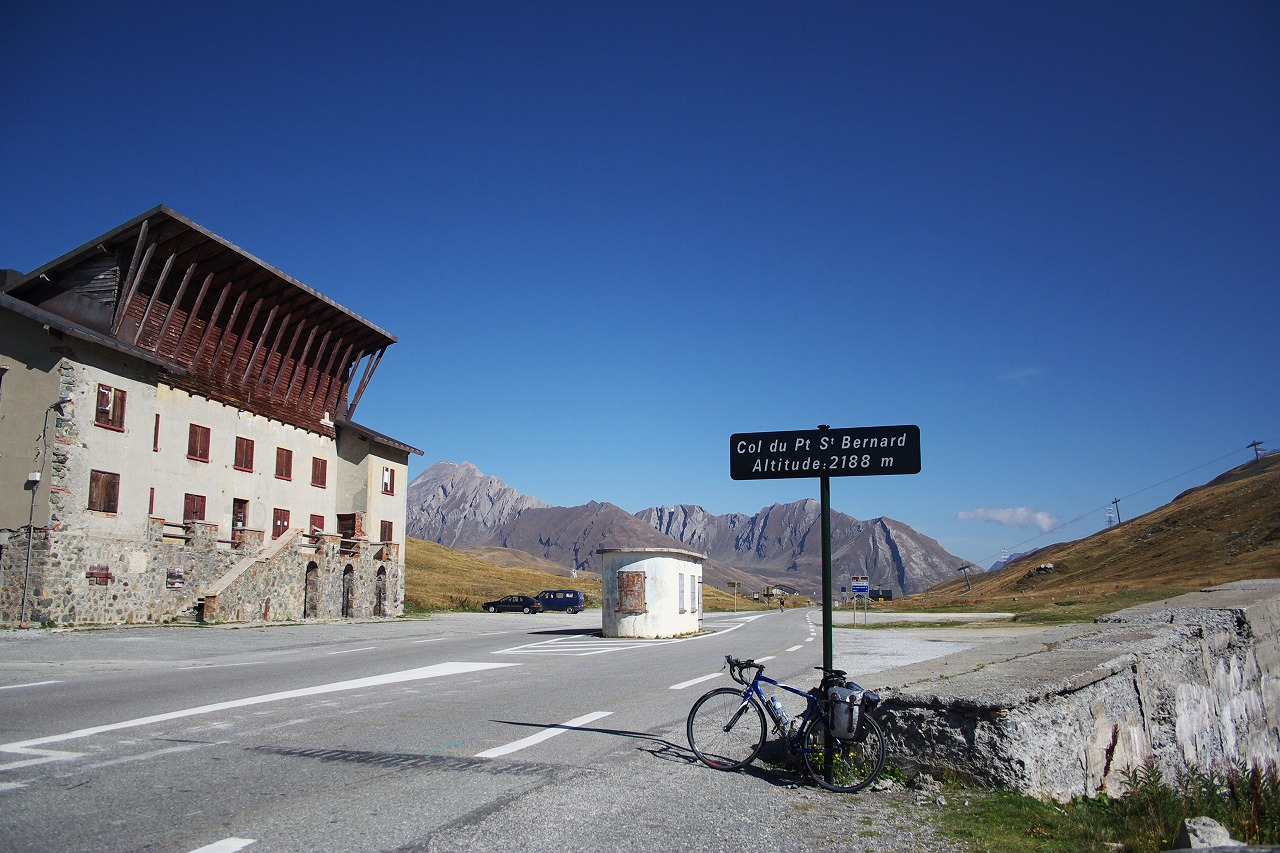
Col du Petit Saint Bernard

The Little St Bernard Pass (French: Col du Petit Saint-Bernard, Italian: Colle del Piccolo San Bernardo) is a mountain pass in the Alps on the France–Italy border. Its saddle is at 2188 metres above sea level. It is located between Savoie, France, and Aosta Valley, Italy, to the south of the Mont Blanc Massif, exactly on the main alpine watershed. There is also a Great St. Bernard Pass, famous for giving the St Bernard breed its name, and a San Bernardino Pass.

The road across this pass (D1090 from Bourg-Saint-Maurice via La Rosiere in France; SS26 from the Aosta Valley via La Thuile in Italy) is usually open from May to October. For current road status see Etat des principaux cols routiers francais.

At the summit, the road cuts through a stone circle measuring 72 m (236 ft) in diameter. A standing stone once stood in the middle. From coin finds this is believed to date from the Iron Age, possibly being a ceremonial site of the Tarentaisian culture (c. 725 BC–450 BC). The stone circle was partly restored in the 19th century.

In the Roman era, a temple dedicated to Jupiter was erected nearby along with a mansio serving travellers along the pass, and it is thought that Carthaginian general Hannibal used this route.

== Tour de France ==
The Little St Bernard Pass was first crossed by the Tour de France in 1949 and has been featured three times since. In 2007, Montée d'Hauteville was climbed on stage 8 of the Tour de France. The pass was featured in the 2009 Tour de France Stage 16 on 21 July from Martigny (Switzerland) to Bourg-Saint-Maurice, 160 km, which also features the Great St Bernard Pass.

Year	Stage	Category	Leader at the summit
2009	16	1	Franco Pellizotti
1963	17	2	Federico Bahamontes
1959	18	1	Michele Gismondi
1949	17	2	Gino Bartali

=== Route ===
From Bourg-Saint-Maurice to the south-west, the Col du Petit Saint-Bernard is 26.5 km long. Over this distance, the climb is 1,348 m (4,423 ft) (an average slope of 5.1%), with the steepest sections at 8.1% at the start of the climb. The first 15.5 km (9.6 mi) to La Rosière forms the Montée d'Hauteville climb.

From Pré-Saint-Didier (in the Aosta Valley region of north-western Italy), the pass is 23.5 km (14.6 mi) long. Over this distance the climb is 1,184 m (3,885 ft) (an average slope of 5%).

== Gallery ==
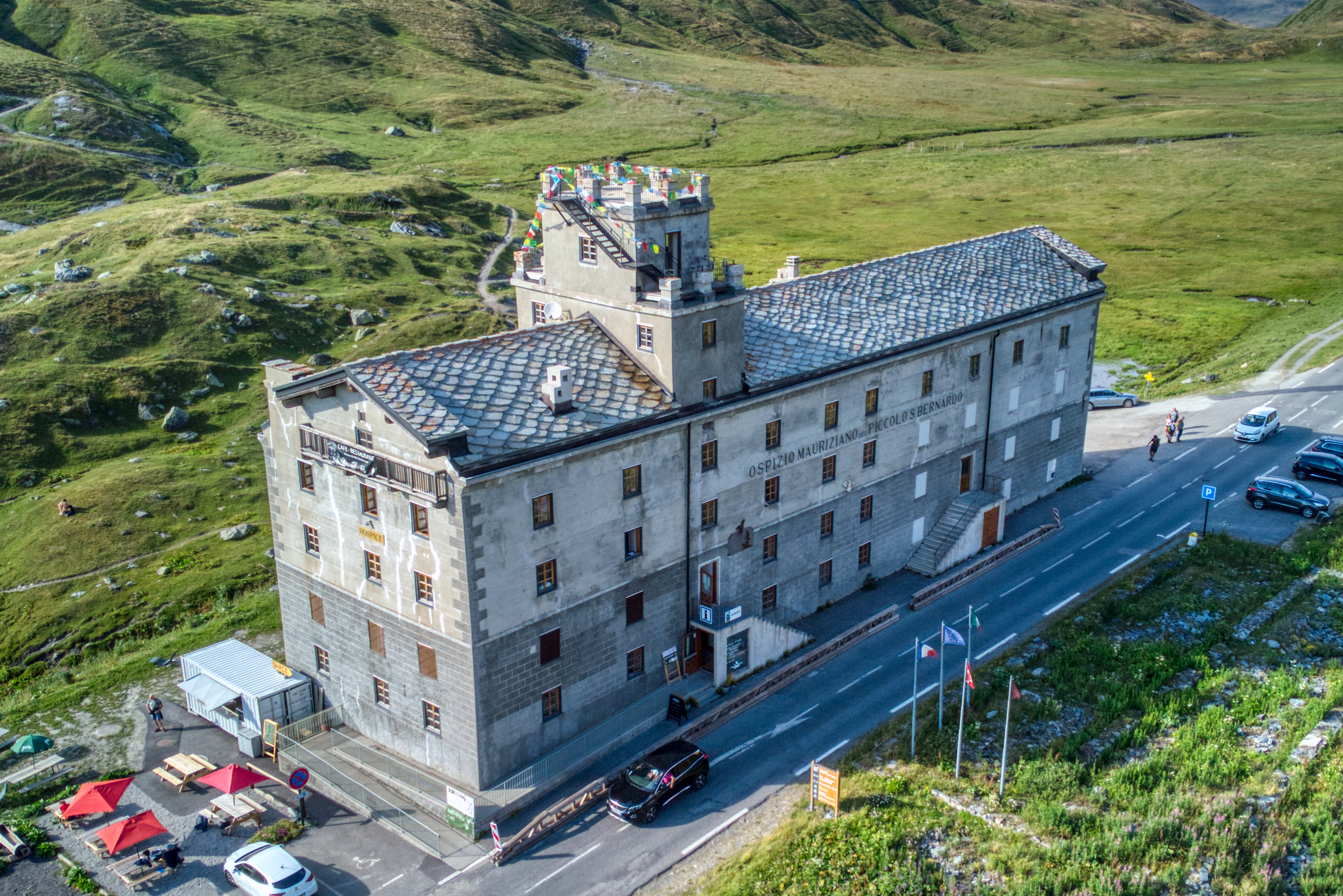
Little St Bernard Hospice

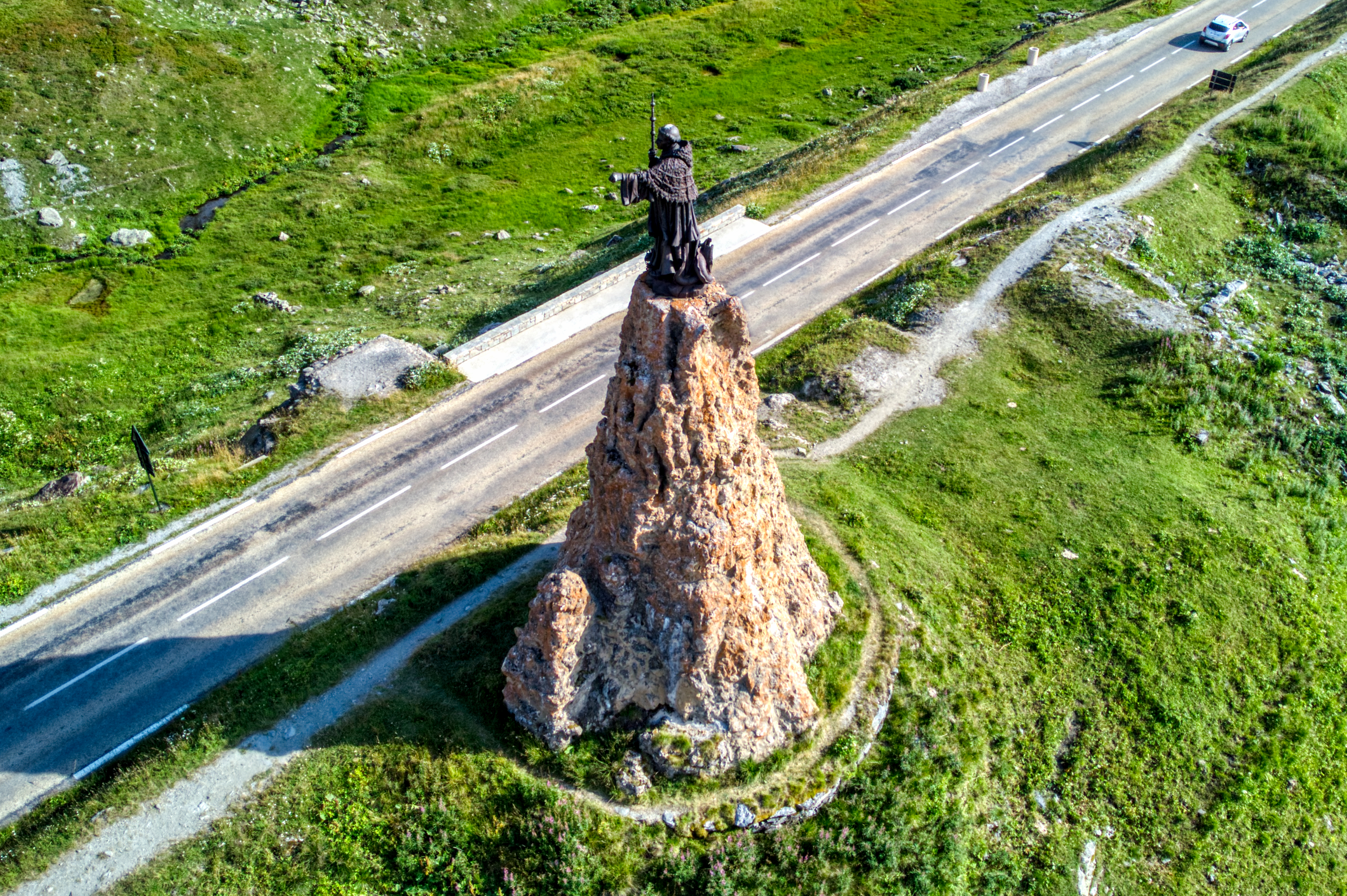
Statue of Saint Bernard of Menthon near the pass

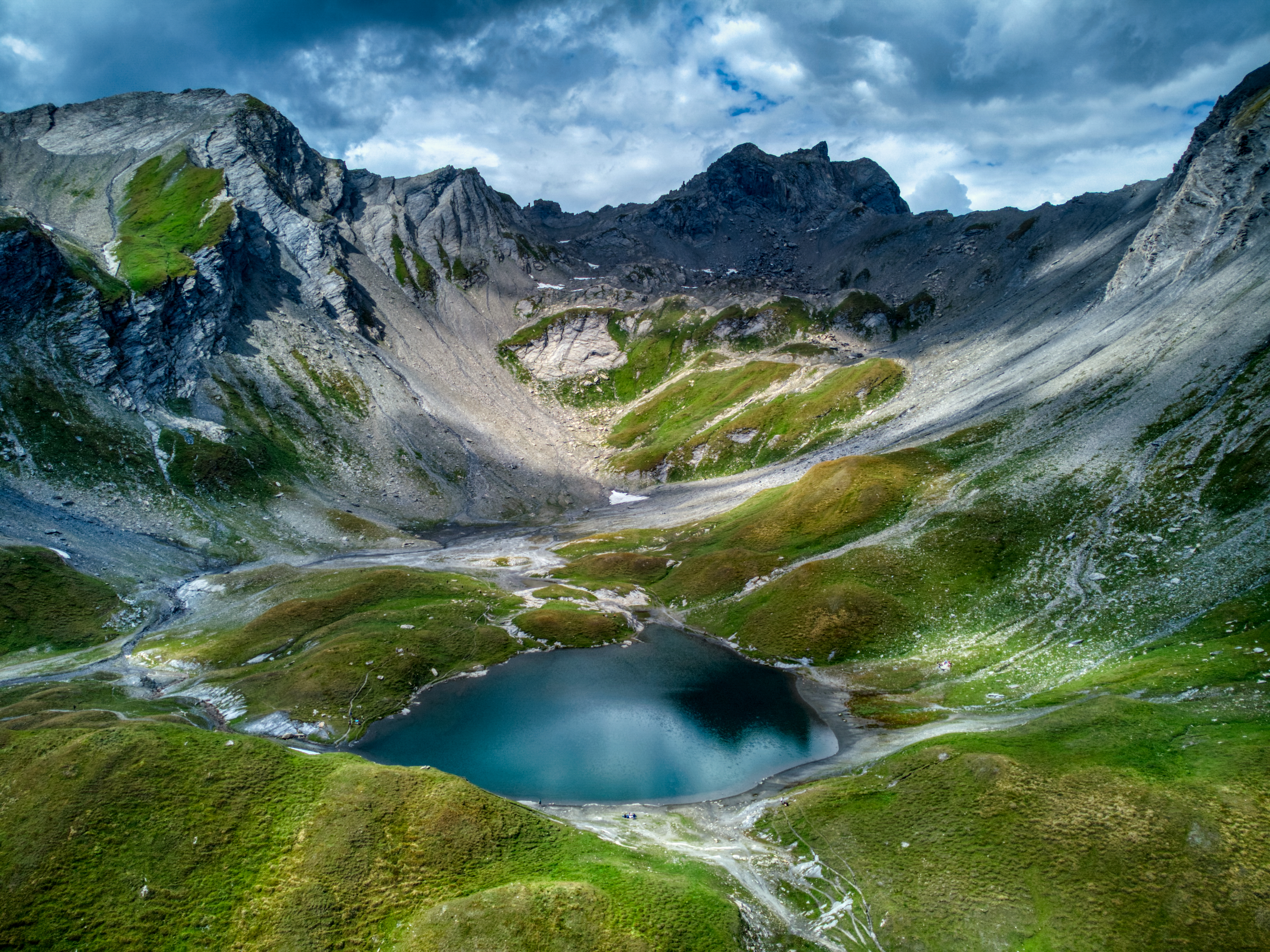
Lac Sans Fond on the French side above the hill

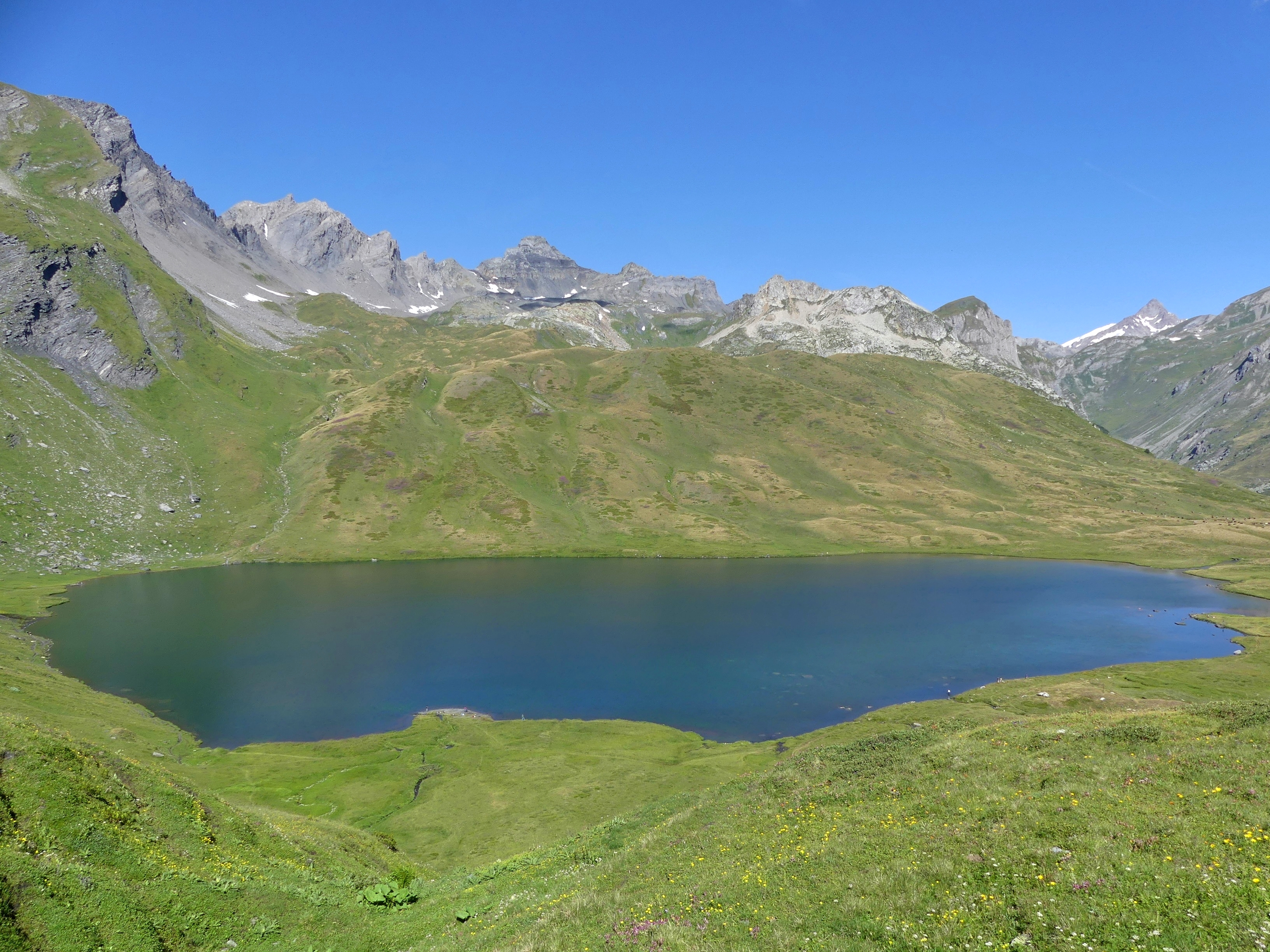
Verney Lake on the Italian side, near the road

== See also ==
- List of highest paved roads in Europe
- List of mountain passes
