= Verney Lake =

Lake at Aosta Valley, Italy

- Lac du Verney
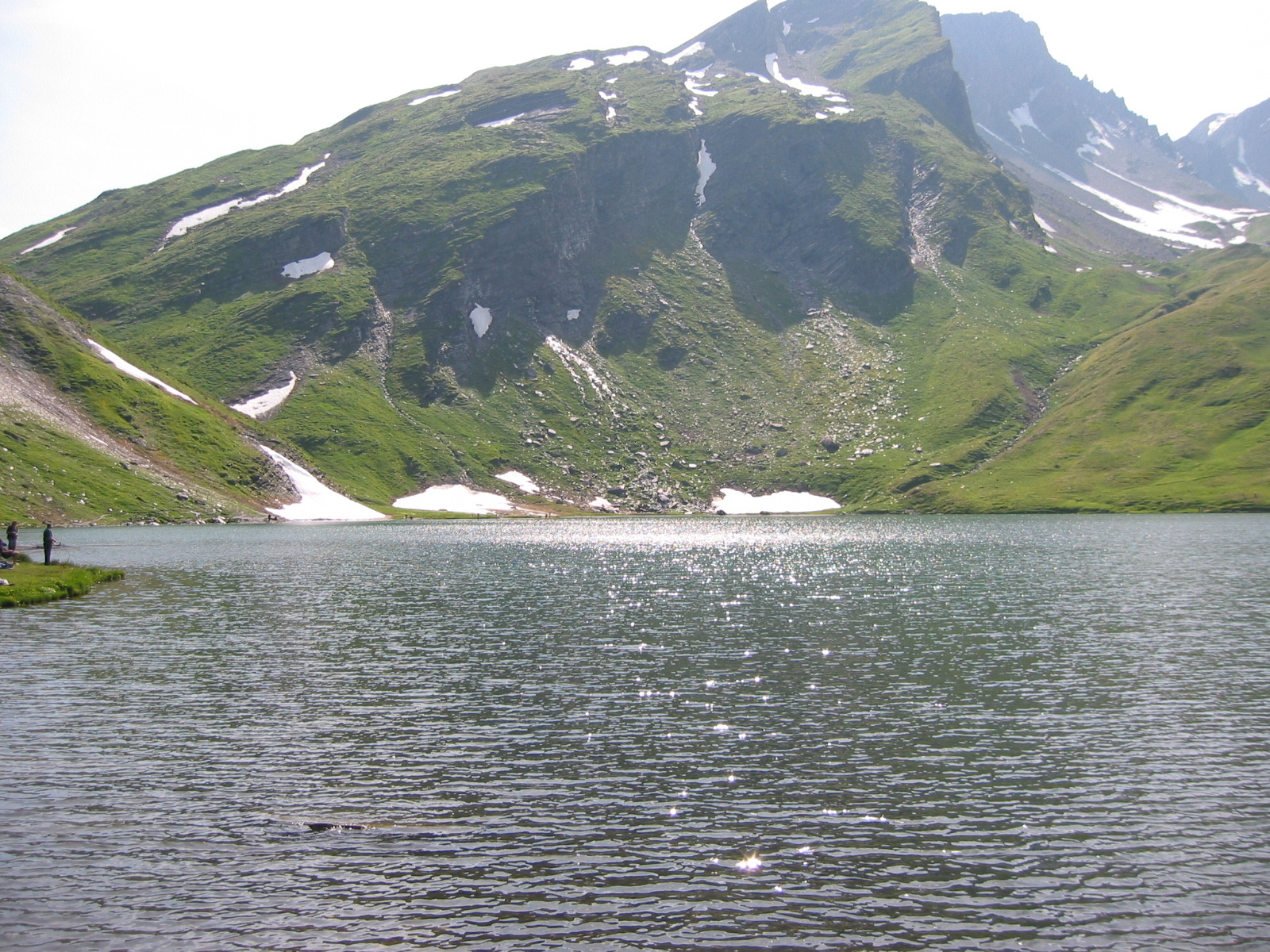

- Location within Aosta Valley Location within Italy Location within Alps
- Interactive map of Verney Lake
- Location: Aosta Valley
- Coordinates: 45°41′17″N 6°52′57″E
- Primary inflows: Dora di Verney
- Primary outflows: Dora di Verney
- Basin countries: Italy
- Surface area: 0.203 km^{2} (0.078 sq mi)
- Surface elevation: 2,088 m (6,850 ft)

Verney Lake (French: Lac du Verney) is a lake at Aosta Valley, Italy. At an elevation of 2088 m, its surface area is 0.203 km².
