= Cormet de Roselend =

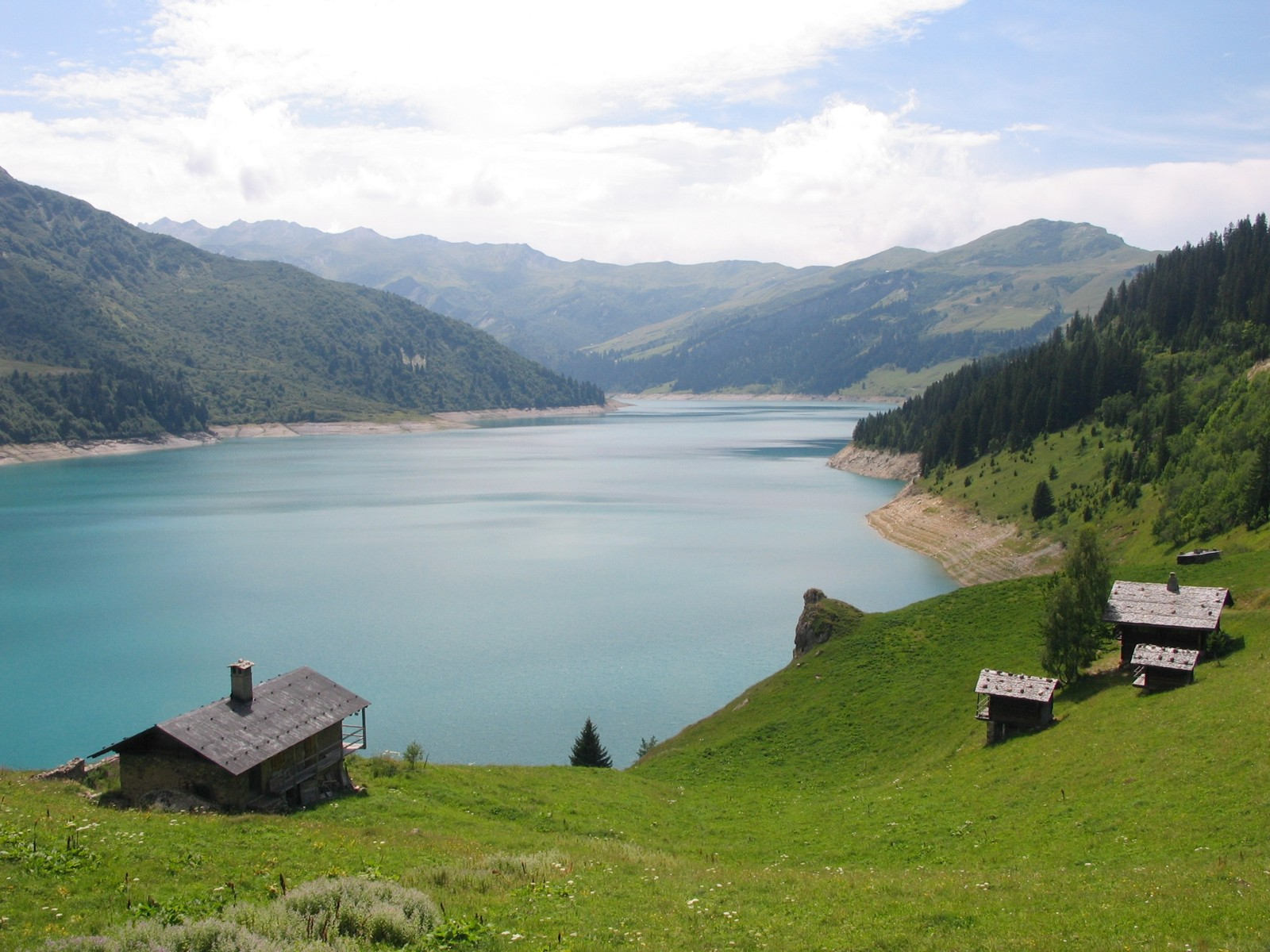
- Lac de Roselend near the pass

- Location within Alps
- Elevation: 1,968 metres (6,457 ft)
- Traversed by: D 925

Third Approach
- Location: Savoie, France
- Range: Alps
- Coordinates: 45°41′28″N 06°41′26″E

Cormet de Roselend (el. 1967 m.) is a high mountain pass in the Alps in the department of Savoie in France.

It connects Beaufort in the Beaufortain valley and Bourg-Saint-Maurice in the Tarentaise Valley. On the west side of the pass lies the Lac de Roselend, a reservoir that can be reached by the Col de Méraillet or the Col du Pré.

== Details of climb ==
On the north-western side, starting from Beaufort, the climb is 20.3 km long. Over this distance, the climb is 1227 m. (an average percentage of 6.0%), with the steepest sections at 9.06%.

From Bourg-Saint-Maurice to the south-east, the Cormet de Roselend is 19.3 km long. Over this distance, the climb is 1154 m. (an average percentage of 6.0%), with the steepest sections at 8.9%.

== Appearances in Tour de France ==
The pass was first included in the Tour de France in 1979 and has since featured 16 times, most recently in stage 19 of the 2025 Tour de France.

Year	Stage	Category	Start	Finish	Leader at the summit
2025	19	2	Albertville	La Plagne	Lenny Martinez (FRA)
2023	17	1	Saint-Gervais-les-Bains	Courchevel	Felix Gall (AUT)
2021	9	2	Cluses	Tignes	Nairo Quintana (COL)
2020	18	1	Méribel	La Roche-sur-Foron	Marc Hirschi (SUI)
2018	11	2	Albertville	La Rosière	Warren Barguil (FRA)
2009	17	1	Bourg-Saint-Maurice	Le Grand-Bornand	~~Franco Pellizotti (ITA)~~
2007	8	1	Le Grand-Bornand	Tignes	Michael Rasmussen (DEN)
2005	10	1	Grenoble	Courchevel	Laurent Brochard (FRA)
2002	17	1	Aime	Cluses	Mario Aerts (BEL)
1996	7	1	Chambéry	Les Arcs	Udo Bölts (GER)
1995	9	1	Le Grand-Bornand	La Plagne	Alex Zülle (SUI)
1992	13	1	Saint-Gervais–Mont Blanc	Sestrières	Claudio Chiappucci (ITA)
1987	22	1	La Plagne	Morzine	Mathieu Hermans (NED)
1984	19	1	La Plagne	Morzine	Francis Castaing (FRA)
1979	16	1	Morzine	Les Menuires	Henk Lubberding (NED)

In the 1996 Tour de France, just before the summit on the Cormet de Roselend, Frenchman Stéphane Heulot cracked, lost the Maillot Jaune and bowed out of the race. It was also on the Cormet de Roselend that Johan Bruyneel overshot a fast left-hand bend and disappeared over the edge, as he descended towards Bourg-St-Maurice. Spectators feared the worst but Bruyneel managed to climb back up, apparently unscathed.

== See also ==
- List of highest paved roads in Europe
- List of mountain passes
