= Col du Pré =

Mountain pass in the French Alps

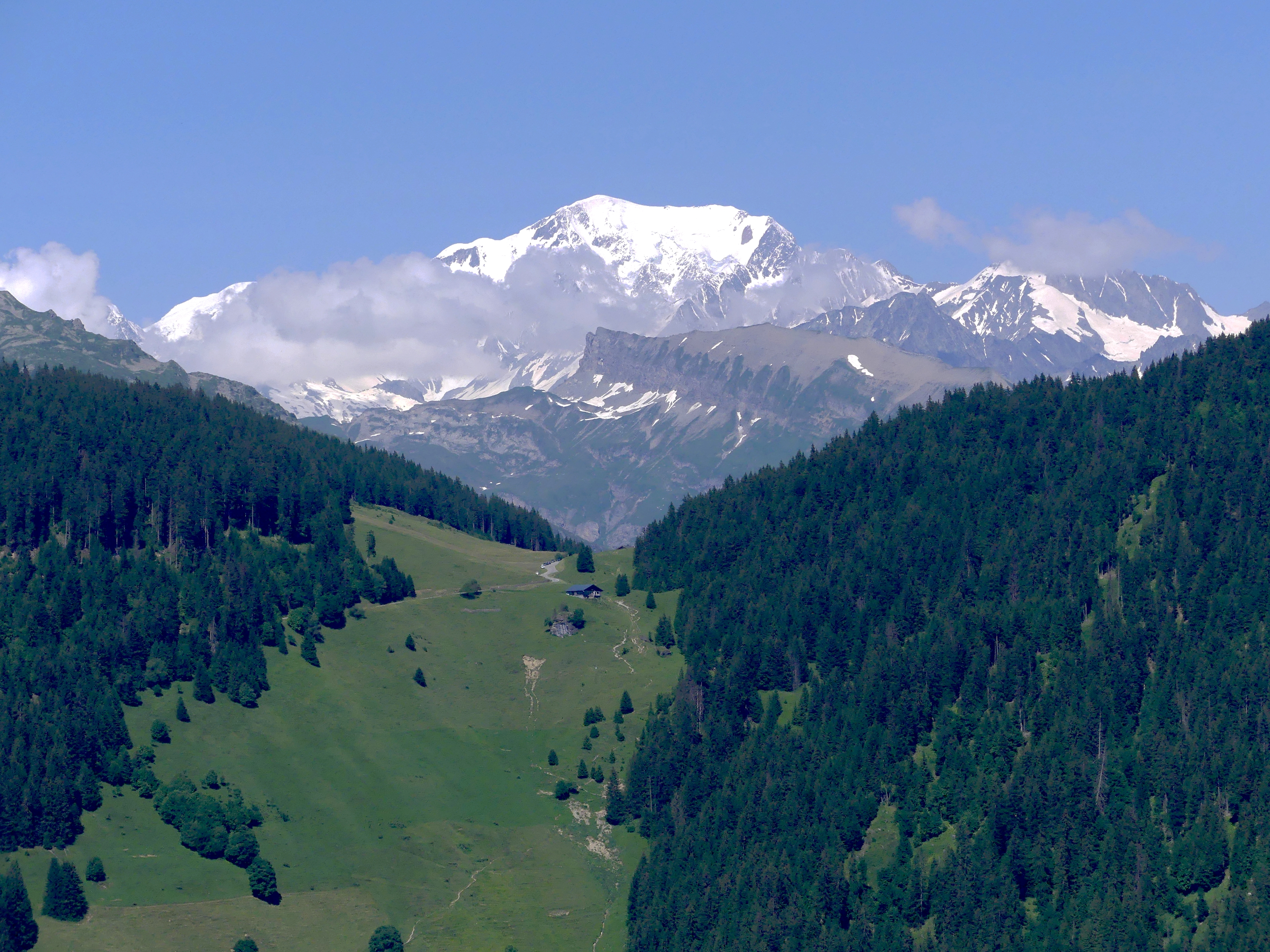
- Interactive map of Col du Pré
- Elevation: 1,703 metres (5,587 ft)

Third Approach
- Location: Beaufort (Savoie), France
- Range: Alps
- Coordinates: 45°41′25″N 6°35′53″E

Col du Pré (el. 1703 m.) is a high mountain pass in the Alps in the department of Savoie in France.

== Details of the climb ==
From Beaufort (west), the climb is 12.2 kilometres (7.6 mi) long, gaining 963 metres (3,159 ft) at an average of 7.9 percent.

From Beaufort via Col de Méraillet (east), the climb is 17.3 kilometres (10.7 mi) long, gaining 1,044 metres (3,425 ft) at an average of 5.6 percent.

From Lac de Roselend (southeast), the climb is 3.2 kilometres (2.0 mi) long, gaining 168 metres (551 ft) at an average of 5.3 percent.

== History ==
The pass has been crossed three times in the Tour de France, most recently in the 19th stage of the 2025 Tour de France.

Year	Stage	Category	Start	Finish	Leader at the summit
2018	11	HC	Albertville	La Rosière	Warren Barguil (FRA)
2021	9	HC	Cluses	Tignes	Nairo Quintana (COL)
2025	19	HC	Albertville	La Plagne	Lenny Martinez (FRA)

== See also ==
- List of highest paved roads in Europe
- List of mountain passes
