= 2025 Tour de France, Stage 12 to Stage 21 =

Cycling results

The 2025 Tour de France was the 112th edition of the Tour de France. It started in Lille on 5 July, and finished with the final stage at Champs-Élysées, Paris, on 27 July.

== Classification standings ==
Legend
Denotes the leader of the general classification	Denotes the leader of the mountains classification
Denotes the leader of the points classification	Denotes the leader of the young rider classification
Denotes the leader of the team classification	Denotes the winner of the combativity award

== Stage 12 ==
17 July 2025 – Auch to Hautacam, 180.6 km (112.2 mi)

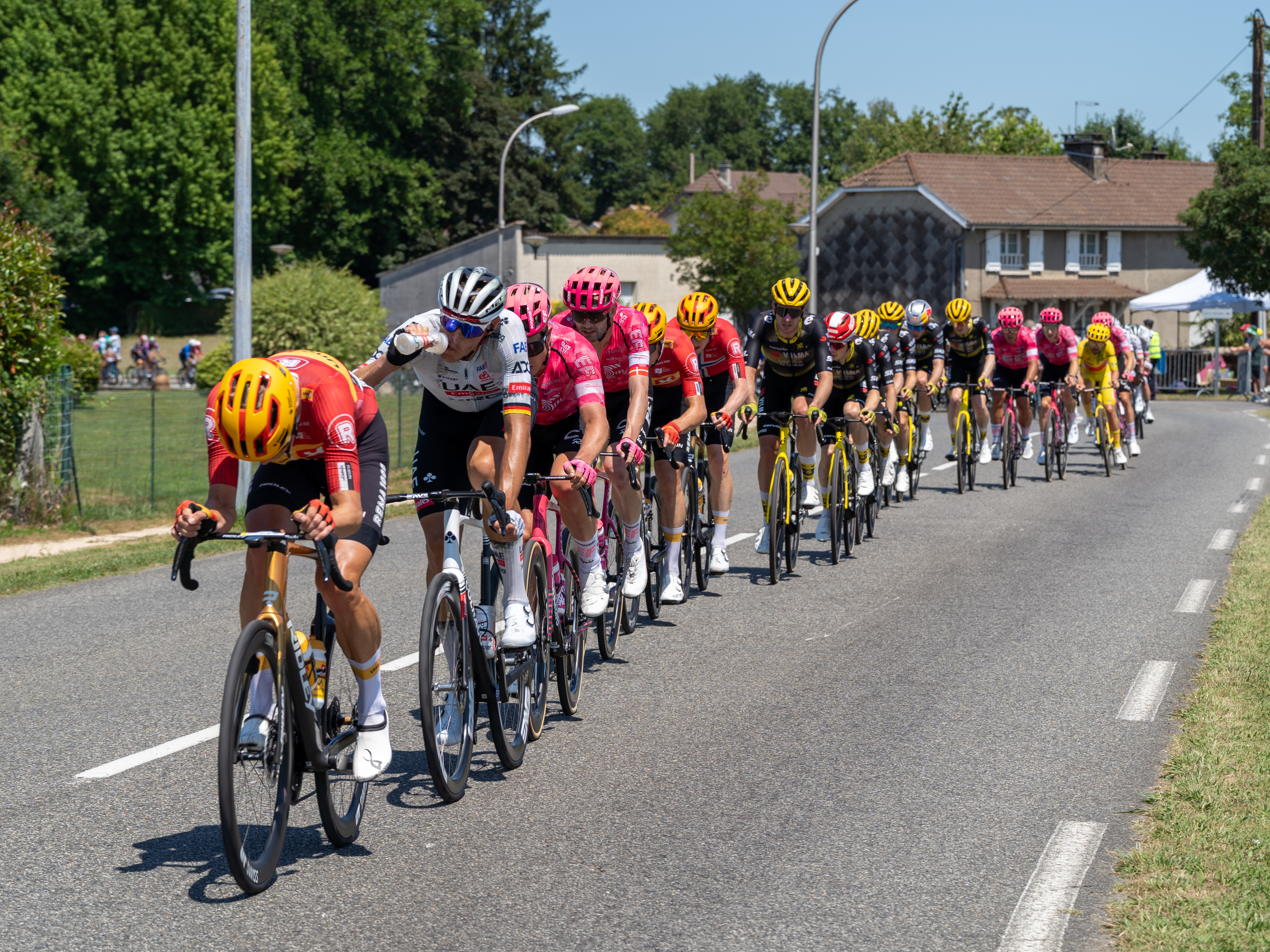
Peloton on stage 12 in Ger in the Pyrénées-Atlantiques department

The twelfth stage was the first in the Pyrenees mountains, with the riders tackling four categorized climbs including the first-category Col du Soulor (11.8km at 7.3%) and a summit finish at the hors catégorie climb of Hautacam (13.5km at 7.8%).

Before the stage, there was a minute of silence held in memory of under-23 rider Samuele Privitera, who died after crashing in stage 1 of Giro della Valle d'Aosta the previous day. A few minutes after the flag dropped, a large group of 52 riders went up the road. The best-placed rider in the GC in the break was Carlos Rodríguez (Ineos Grenadiers), who was 5' 44" down on Ben Healy (EF Education–EasyPost) at the start of the day. Due to Rodríguez's presence in the break, Uno-X Mobility, UAE Team Emirates XRG, and EF Education–EasyPost kept the gap to the break stable at just under two minutes. The race soon approached the Col du Soulor after 122 kilometres (76 mi) of racing. On the climb, the break splintered into pieces with Michael Woods (Israel–Premier Tech) leading at the top a few seconds ahead of Mattias Skjelmose (Lidl–Trek) and Bruno Armirail (Decathlon–AG2R La Mondiale). Behind in the peloton, Visma–Lease a Bike began to set a hard tempo, dropping several riders including Remco Evenepoel (Soudal–Quick-Step) and Healy. However, they had to ease the pace in the middle of the climb after Matteo Jorgenson started to struggle, letting the American get back in the GC group. At the top, the break's advantage still stood at around two minutes.

On the descent of Col du Soulor, Armirail dropped his breakaway companions, gradually increasing his advantage over the chase group. As the race reached the following climb to Col des Bordères, Jorgenson began to struggle but regained pace. On the descent of Col des Bordères, Evenepoel made it back to the peloton as UAE Team Emirates XRG took up the pacemaking with Tim Wellens, who was part of the original 52-man break. They closed down the first chase group.

Armirail reached the foot of the Hautacam with a lead of just over a minute and a half. At the bottom of the Hautacam, Wellens piled on the pressure, isolating Jonas Vingegaard (Visma–Lease a Bike) in the process. Afterwards, Jhonatan Narváez (UAE Team Emirates XRG) began a hard leadout for his teammate Tadej Pogačar, with Vingegaard the only rider able to follow. Vingegaard was soon gapped just before Pogačar made his attack with 12 kilometres (7.5 mi) left. Pogačar gradually extended his advantage over Vingegaard all the way to the top. Behind the two, Florian Lipowitz (Red Bull–Bora–Hansgrohe) emerged as the strongest of the rest, dropping the rest of the reduced GC group. At the finish, Pogačar took his third stage of this year's Tour, putting more than two minutes into Vingegaard. Lipowitz was only a further 13 seconds down on Vingegaard while the rest of the main GC contenders finished in dribs and drabs more than three or four minutes behind Pogačar. Healy in the yellow jersey lost 13 minutes, falling to 11th overall.

In the GC, Pogačar regained the yellow jersey, increasing his advantage to more than three and a half minutes over Vingegaard. Evenepoel kept his podium position at almost five minutes down after finishing the stage three and a half minutes behind Pogačar. Lipowitz and Kévin Vauquelin (Arkéa–B&B Hotels) rounded out the top five, with both riders at more than five and a half minutes down and only separated by six seconds.

Stage 12 Result
Rank	Rider	Team	Time
1	Tadej Pogačar (SLO)	UAE Team Emirates XRG	4h 21' 19"
2	Jonas Vingegaard (DEN)	Visma–Lease a Bike	+ 2' 10"
3	Florian Lipowitz (GER)	Red Bull–Bora–Hansgrohe	+ 2' 23"
4	Tobias Halland Johannessen (NOR)	Uno-X Mobility	+ 3' 00"
5	Oscar Onley (GBR)	Team Picnic–PostNL	+ 3' 00"
6	Kévin Vauquelin (FRA)	Arkéa–B&B Hotels	+ 3' 33"
7	Remco Evenepoel (BEL)	Soudal–Quick-Step	+ 3' 35"
8	Felix Gall (AUT)	Decathlon–AG2R La Mondiale	+ 4' 02"
9	Primož Roglič (SLO)	Red Bull–Bora–Hansgrohe	+ 4' 08"
10	Cristián Rodríguez (ESP)	Arkéa–B&B Hotels	+ 7' 26"

General classification after Stage 12
Rank	Rider	Team	Time
1	Tadej Pogačar (SLO)	UAE Team Emirates XRG	45h 22' 51"
2	Jonas Vingegaard (DEN)	Visma–Lease a Bike	+ 3' 31"
3	Remco Evenepoel (BEL)	Soudal–Quick-Step	+ 4' 45"
4	Florian Lipowitz (GER)	Red Bull–Bora–Hansgrohe	+ 5' 34"
5	Kévin Vauquelin (FRA)	Arkéa–B&B Hotels	+ 5' 40"
6	Oscar Onley (GBR)	Team Picnic–PostNL	+ 6' 05"
7	Primož Roglič (SLO)	Red Bull–Bora–Hansgrohe	+ 7' 30"
8	Tobias Halland Johannessen (NOR)	Uno-X Mobility	+ 7' 44"
9	Felix Gall (AUT)	Decathlon–AG2R La Mondiale	+ 9' 21"
10	Matteo Jorgenson (USA)	Visma–Lease a Bike	+ 12' 12"

== Stage 13 ==
18 July 2025 – Loudenvielle to Peyragudes, 10.9 km (6.8 mi)

The second individual time trial on the 2025 Tour took place in the Pyrenees, over a 10.9-kilometre (6.8 mi) route climbing to the Peyragudes altiport, a first-category climb of 8 km (5.0 mi) at an average gradient of 7.9 percent. There were two intermediate time checks on the course, located at 4 kilometres (2.5 mi) and 7.6 kilometres (4.7 mi). The stage was the first mountain time trial since the 2020 Tour de France.

The earliest benchmark time was set by Luke Plapp (Team Jayco–AlUla), who set a time of 24' 58". He sat in the hot seat for a long time and his time was good enough for fifth at the end of the day. Lenny Martinez (Team Bahrain Victorious) came close to beating Plapp's time but he fell short by 23 seconds. Another rider who challenged Plapp's time was Adam Yates (UAE Team Emirates XRG), who was only 17 seconds down on the Australian. No other riders were close to challenging Plapp's time until the main GC contenders headed down the start ramp. Jorgenson managed to beat Plapp at the first time check but the American lost time on the climb, eventually finishing four seconds behind the Australian.

It was not until Primož Roglič (Red Bull–Bora–Hansgrohe), the seventh-place rider on GC, went down the start ramp that someone finished ahead of Plapp. He gradually increased his advantage throughout the course before setting a time of 24' 20", 38 seconds ahead of Plapp. His time was eventually good enough for third on the stage. His Red Bull–Bora–Hansgrohe teammate, Florian Lipowitz, also set a good time, finishing 36 seconds behind Roglič. Soon, the focus turned to the top three on GC, starting with Evenepoel. After setting the eventual second-best time at the first time-check, Evenepoel struggled throughout the rest of the course. He was overtaken near the finish by Vingegaard, who briefly went into the hot seat with a time of 23' 36", 44 seconds ahead of Roglič. However, the best performance came from Pogačar in the yellow jersey. He set the best time at both time checks before finishing with a time of exactly 23 minutes, winning the stage by 36 seconds over Vingegaard. It marked his fourth stage win in this race and his 21st overall in the Tour. In the GC, Pogačar extended his advantage to over four minutes on Vingegaard. Despite his struggles, Evenepoel retained his third place at over seven minutes down but he was now only six seconds ahead of Lipowitz. The third to seventh placed riders were separated by only 1' 26" at the end of the day.

Stage 13 Result
Rank	Rider	Team	Time
1	Tadej Pogačar (SLO)	UAE Team Emirates XRG	23' 00"
2	Jonas Vingegaard (DEN)	Visma–Lease a Bike	+ 36"
3	Primož Roglič (SLO)	Red Bull–Bora–Hansgrohe	+ 1' 20"
4	Florian Lipowitz (GER)	Red Bull–Bora–Hansgrohe	+ 1' 56"
5	Luke Plapp (AUS)	Team Jayco–AlUla	+ 1' 58"
6	Matteo Jorgenson (USA)	Visma–Lease a Bike	+ 2' 02"
7	Oscar Onley (GBR)	Team Picnic–PostNL	+ 2' 06"
8	Adam Yates (GBR)	UAE Team Emirates XRG	+ 2' 15"
9	Lenny Martinez (FRA)	Team Bahrain Victorious	+ 2' 21"
10	Felix Gall (AUT)	Decathlon–AG2R La Mondiale	+ 2' 22"

General classification after Stage 13
Rank	Rider	Team	Time
1	Tadej Pogačar (SLO)	UAE Team Emirates XRG	45h 45' 51"
2	Jonas Vingegaard (DEN)	Visma–Lease a Bike	+ 4' 07"
3	Remco Evenepoel (BEL)	Soudal–Quick-Step	+ 7' 24"
4	Florian Lipowitz (GER)	Red Bull–Bora–Hansgrohe	+ 7' 30"
5	Oscar Onley (GBR)	Team Picnic–PostNL	+ 8' 11"
6	Kévin Vauquelin (FRA)	Arkéa–B&B Hotels	+ 8' 15"
7	Primož Roglič (SLO)	Red Bull–Bora–Hansgrohe	+ 8' 50"
8	Tobias Halland Johannessen (NOR)	Uno-X Mobility	+ 10' 36"
9	Felix Gall (AUT)	Decathlon–AG2R La Mondiale	+ 11' 43"
10	Matteo Jorgenson (USA)	Visma–Lease a Bike	+ 14' 15"

== Stage 14 ==
19 July 2025 – Pau to Superbagnères, 182.6 km (113.5 mi)

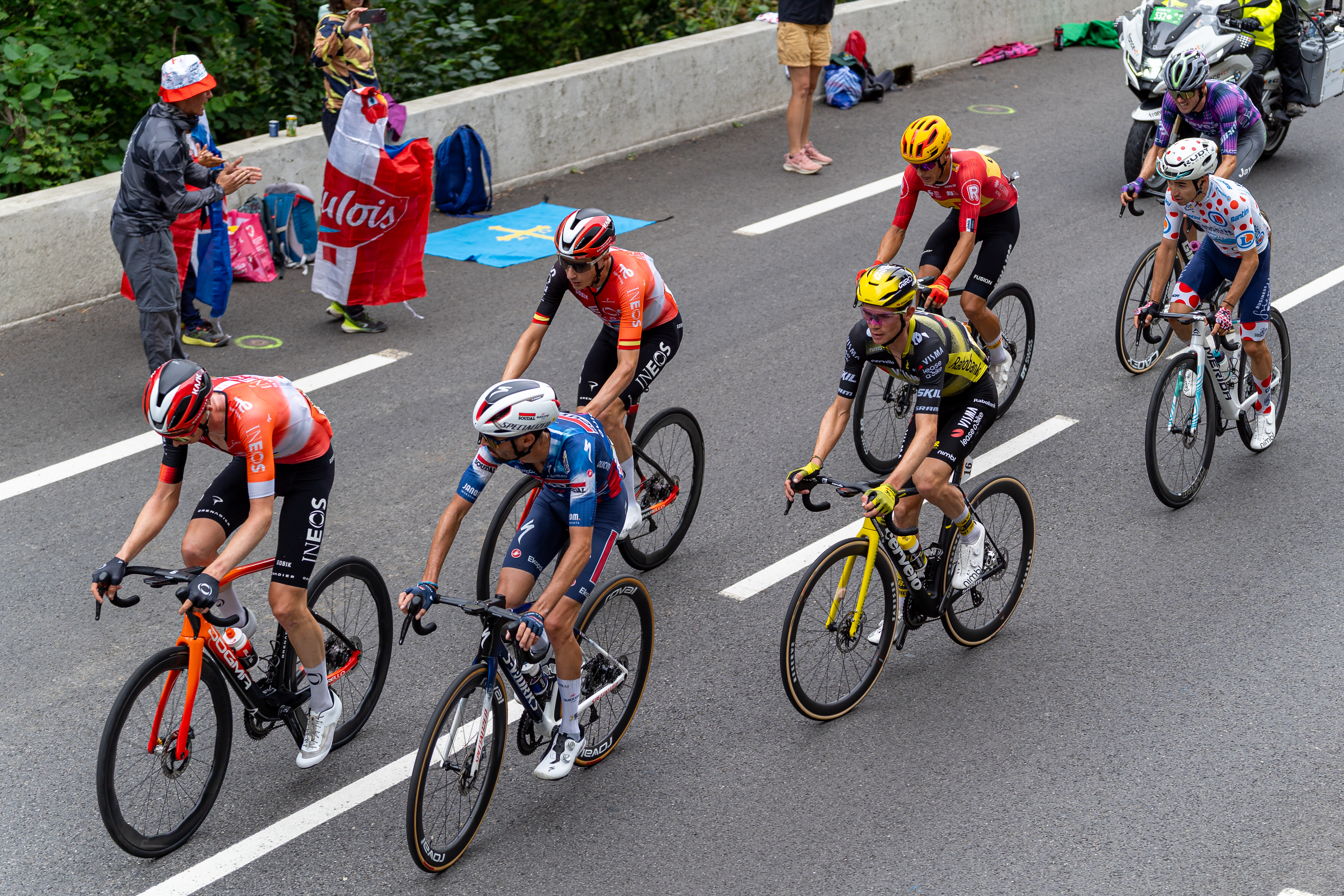
Breakaway on the Col de Peyresourde, including stage winner Thymen Arensman

The fourteenth stage remained in the Pyrenees, with media considering the 182.6 km (113.5 mi) route from Pau to Superbagnères to be one of the queen stages of the 2025 Tour. The stage had four categorized climbs, with the hors catégorie Col du Tourmalet (19km at 7.9%), the second-category Col d'Aspin (5km at 7.6%) and the first-category Col de Peyresourde (7.1km at 7.8%). The final climb was a summit finish at the Superbagnères ski station – a hors catégorie climb 12.4km in length with an average gradient of 7.3%, finishing at an elevation of 1,804 m (5,919 ft). The Superbagnères climb was last used at the 1989 Tour de France.

Multiple attacks marked the start of the stage with no break being formed until after the intermediate sprint with 111 kilometres (69 mi) to go, where Jonathan Milan (Lidl–Trek) took maximum points to increase his lead in the points classification. Immediately afterwards, the riders climbed the Col du Tourmalet where a 17-man break gradually began to form. Among the riders in the break was Tobias Halland Johannessen (Uno-X Mobility), who was eighth overall at the start of the day. As the peloton set a steady tempo, Evenepoel, the third-placed rider on GC, was quickly dropped. His teammate, Pascal Eenkhoorn, tried to bring him back but the Belgian continued to struggle before eventually abandoning the race. Evenepoel's team subsequently reported that he abandoned the race to "preserve the rest of his season".

Up front, Martinez attacked in pursuit of KOM points for the mountains classification, building a lead of two minutes on the rest of the break. He took maximum points at the top of the Tourmalet and Aspin, taking back the lead in the mountains classification. On the descent of the Aspin, Martinez waited for Sepp Kuss (Visma–Lease a Bike) and Valentin Paret-Peintre (Soudal–Quick-Step), who had detached themselves from the rest of the break on the descent of the Tourmalet. At this point, the UAE Team Emirates XRG-led peloton was around four minutes behind.

On the foot of the Peyresourde, the trio up front were caught by eight riders from the chase group while the peloton was closing in to within two and a half minutes of the break. With 37 kilometres (23 mi) left, Thymen Arensman (Ineos Grenadiers) attacked from the break. He quickly built a one-minute gap over the chase group and extended his advantage over the peloton to more than three and a half minutes at the top of the Peyresourde. As the riders reached the Superbagnères, the peloton closed in on the chase group while Arensman maintained an advantage of around three minutes. Midway up the climb, Felix Gall (Decathlon–AG2R La Mondiale) attacked the group of favorites, building a gap of around 30 seconds. 4 kilometres (2.5 mi) from the top, Vingegaard accelerated with Pogačar and Lipowitz going straight to his wheel. Pogačar launched a counterattack with Vingegaard in the wheel, dropping Lipowitz and going past Gall in the process. The top two on GC closed in on Arensman but the Dutchman held them off to win his first Tour stage. A minute later, Pogačar surged past Vingegaard to gain four more seconds on the road and two bonus seconds. Gall and Lipowitz finished 11 and 17 seconds behind Pogačar, respectively, while Oscar Onley (Team Picnic–PostNL) was the best of the rest, losing a minute to Pogačar.

In the GC, Pogačar extended his lead to 4' 13" over Vingegaard. With Evenepoel's abandon, Lipowitz took over third place and the white jersey, now holding an advantage of 1' 25" over Onley, who rose to fourth overall.

Stage 14 Result
Rank	Rider	Team	Time
1	Thymen Arensman (NED)	Ineos Grenadiers	4h 53' 35"
2	Tadej Pogačar (SLO)	UAE Team Emirates XRG	+ 1' 08"
3	Jonas Vingegaard (DEN)	Visma–Lease a Bike	+ 1' 12"
4	Felix Gall (AUT)	Decathlon–AG2R La Mondiale	+ 1' 19"
5	Florian Lipowitz (GER)	Red Bull–Bora–Hansgrohe	+ 1' 25"
6	Oscar Onley (GBR)	Team Picnic–PostNL	+ 2' 09"
7	Ben Healy (IRL)	EF Education–EasyPost	+ 2' 46"
8	Primož Roglič (SLO)	Red Bull–Bora–Hansgrohe	+ 2' 46"
9	Tobias Halland Johannessen (NOR)	Uno-X Mobility	+ 2' 59"
10	Kévin Vauquelin (FRA)	Arkéa–B&B Hotels	+ 3' 08"

General classification after Stage 14
Rank	Rider	Team	Time
1	Tadej Pogačar (SLO)	UAE Team Emirates XRG	50h 40' 28"
2	Jonas Vingegaard (DEN)	Visma–Lease a Bike	+ 4' 13"
3	Florian Lipowitz (GER)	Red Bull–Bora–Hansgrohe	+ 7' 53"
4	Oscar Onley (GBR)	Team Picnic–PostNL	+ 9' 18"
5	Kévin Vauquelin (FRA)	Arkéa–B&B Hotels	+ 10' 21"
6	Primož Roglič (SLO)	Red Bull–Bora–Hansgrohe	+ 10' 34"
7	Felix Gall (AUT)	Decathlon–AG2R La Mondiale	+ 12' 00"
8	Tobias Halland Johannessen (NOR)	Uno-X Mobility	+ 12' 33"
9	Ben Healy (IRL)	EF Education–EasyPost	+ 18' 41"
10	Carlos Rodríguez (ESP)	Ineos Grenadiers	+ 22' 57"

== Stage 15 ==
20 July 2025 – Muret to Carcassonne, 169.3 km (105.2 mi)

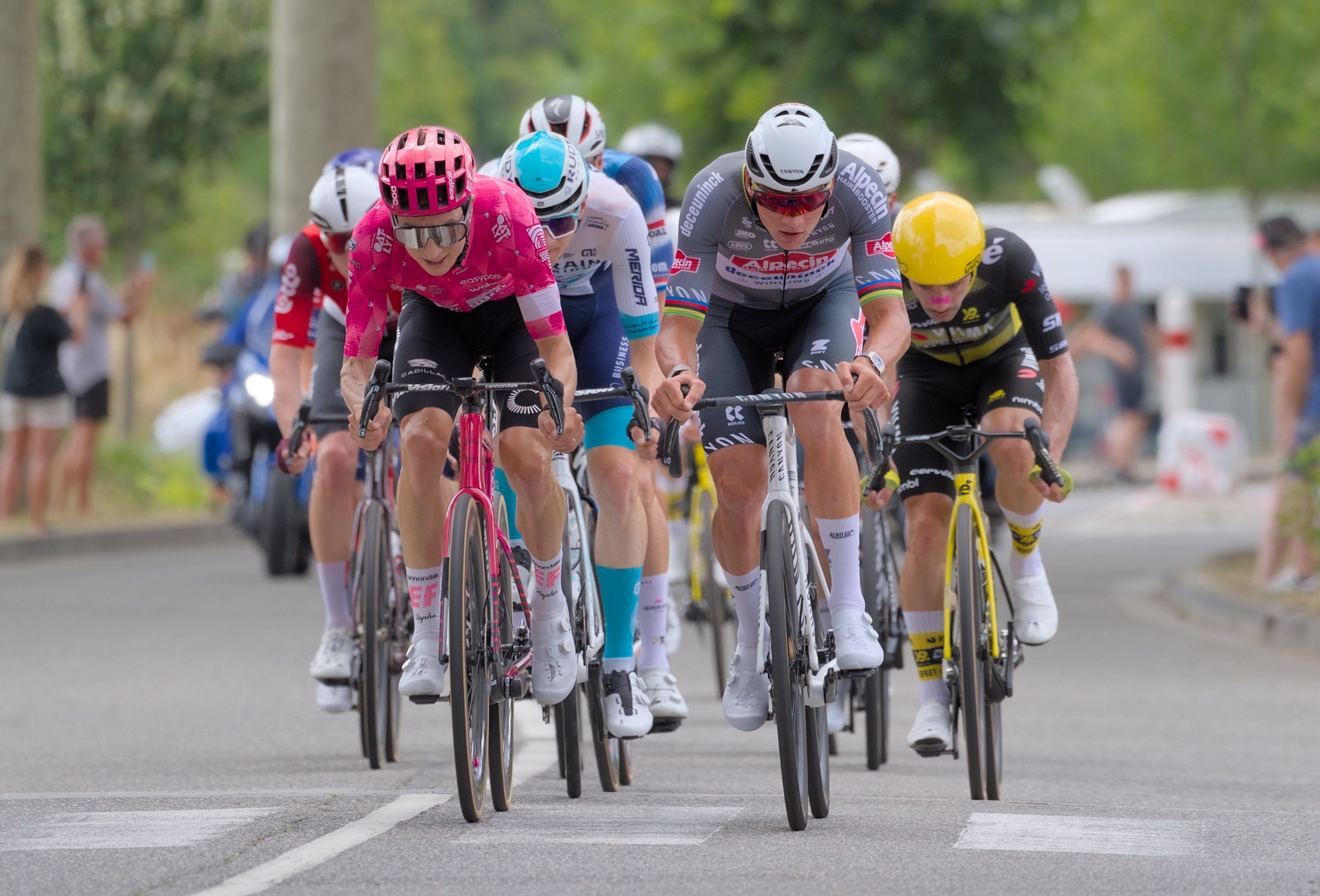
Mathieu van der Poel and Neilson Powless leading the breakaway in Gardouch

Leaving the Pyrenees, stage 15 took the riders eastwards from Muret to Carcassonne over a rolling 169.3-kilometre (105.2 mi) route with three categorized climbs. The stage was expected to be contested by the breakaway.

As the riders were attempting to go into the breakaway, there was a crash that split the peloton. Among those involved were Vingegaard and Lipowitz, the second and third placed riders overall. All GC contenders were caught out with the exception of Pogačar in the yellow jersey. He tried to slow down the front group to wait for the others but the attacks to form the break continued. Eventually, the peloton reformed while a group of 15 riders went up the road, holding a lead of less than a minute. At the intermediate sprint with 109 kilometres (68 mi) left, Mathieu van der Poel (Alpecin–Deceuninck) took maximum points to move within 41 points of the lead in the points classification. As the riders reached the first climb on the day, multiple riders attacked from the peloton to join the break. At the top of the first two climbs, an eight-man group composed of Wellens, Rodríguez, Victor Campenaerts (Visma–Lease a Bike), Neilson Powless (EF Education–EasyPost), Matej Mohorič (Team Bahrain Victorious), Quinn Simmons (Lidl–Trek), Michael Storer (Tudor Pro Cycling Team), and Alexey Lutsenko (Israel–Premier Tech) led a group of 26 by just under a minute while the peloton was content to let the break fight for the win.

On the approach to the Pas du Sant (2.9 km at 10.2%), the final climb on the stage, Andreas Leknessund (Uno-X Mobility) managed to bridge to the front group. On the climb, Storer attacked from the bottom, followed immediately by Simmons. Behind them, Campanearts and Wellens were setting a steady pace which allowed them to catch the two up front. After Storer made an unsuccessful attack near the top of the climb, Warren Barguil (Team Picnic–PostNL), Aleksandr Vlasov (Red Bull–Bora–Hansgrohe), Rodríguez, and Lutsenko joined the quartet up front. With 43.5 kilometres (27.0 mi) left, Wellens made his move. Barguil tried to go with the Belgian but he was unsuccessful and Wellens gradually increased his advantage over the chasers. The chase group was soon caught by the remnants of the break on the approach to the finish, where Wellens celebrated his first Tour stage win. With the win, he completed the trilogy of winning a stage at all three Grand Tours. Near the finish, Campanearts was able to get away from the chase group to take second place while Julian Alaphilippe (Tudor Pro Cycling Team) led the rest of the break across the line after having mistakenly thought that he won the stage. The peloton finished more than six minutes down. The only change in the GC was Rodríguez passing Healy for ninth after gaining almost five minutes from the break.

Stage 15 Result
Rank	Rider	Team	Time
1	Tim Wellens (BEL)	UAE Team Emirates XRG	3h 34' 09"
2	Victor Campenaerts (BEL)	Visma–Lease a Bike	+ 1' 28"
3	Julian Alaphilippe (FRA)	Tudor Pro Cycling Team	+ 1' 36"
4	Wout van Aert (BEL)	Visma–Lease a Bike	+ 1' 36"
5	Axel Laurance (FRA)	Ineos Grenadiers	+ 1' 36"
6	Aleksandr Vlasov	Red Bull–Bora–Hansgrohe	+ 1' 36"
7	Jasper Stuyven (BEL)	Lidl–Trek	+ 1' 36"
8	Jordan Jegat (FRA)	Team TotalEnergies	+ 1' 36"
9	Michael Valgren (DEN)	EF Education–EasyPost	+ 1' 36"
10	Valentin Madouas (FRA)	Groupama–FDJ	+ 1' 36"

General classification after Stage 15
Rank	Rider	Team	Time
1	Tadej Pogačar (SLO)	UAE Team Emirates XRG	54h 20' 44"
2	Jonas Vingegaard (DEN)	Visma–Lease a Bike	+ 4' 13"
3	Florian Lipowitz (GER)	Red Bull–Bora–Hansgrohe	+ 7' 53"
4	Oscar Onley (GBR)	Team Picnic–PostNL	+ 9' 18"
5	Kévin Vauquelin (FRA)	Arkéa–B&B Hotels	+ 10' 21"
6	Primož Roglič (SLO)	Red Bull–Bora–Hansgrohe	+ 10' 34"
7	Felix Gall (AUT)	Decathlon–AG2R La Mondiale	+ 12' 00"
8	Tobias Halland Johannessen (NOR)	Uno-X Mobility	+ 12' 33"
9	Carlos Rodríguez (ESP)	Ineos Grenadiers	+ 18' 26"
10	Ben Healy (IRL)	EF Education–EasyPost	+ 18' 41"

== Rest day 2 ==
21 July 2025 – Montpellier

== Stage 16 ==
22 July 2025 – Montpellier to Mont Ventoux, 171.5 km (106.6 mi)

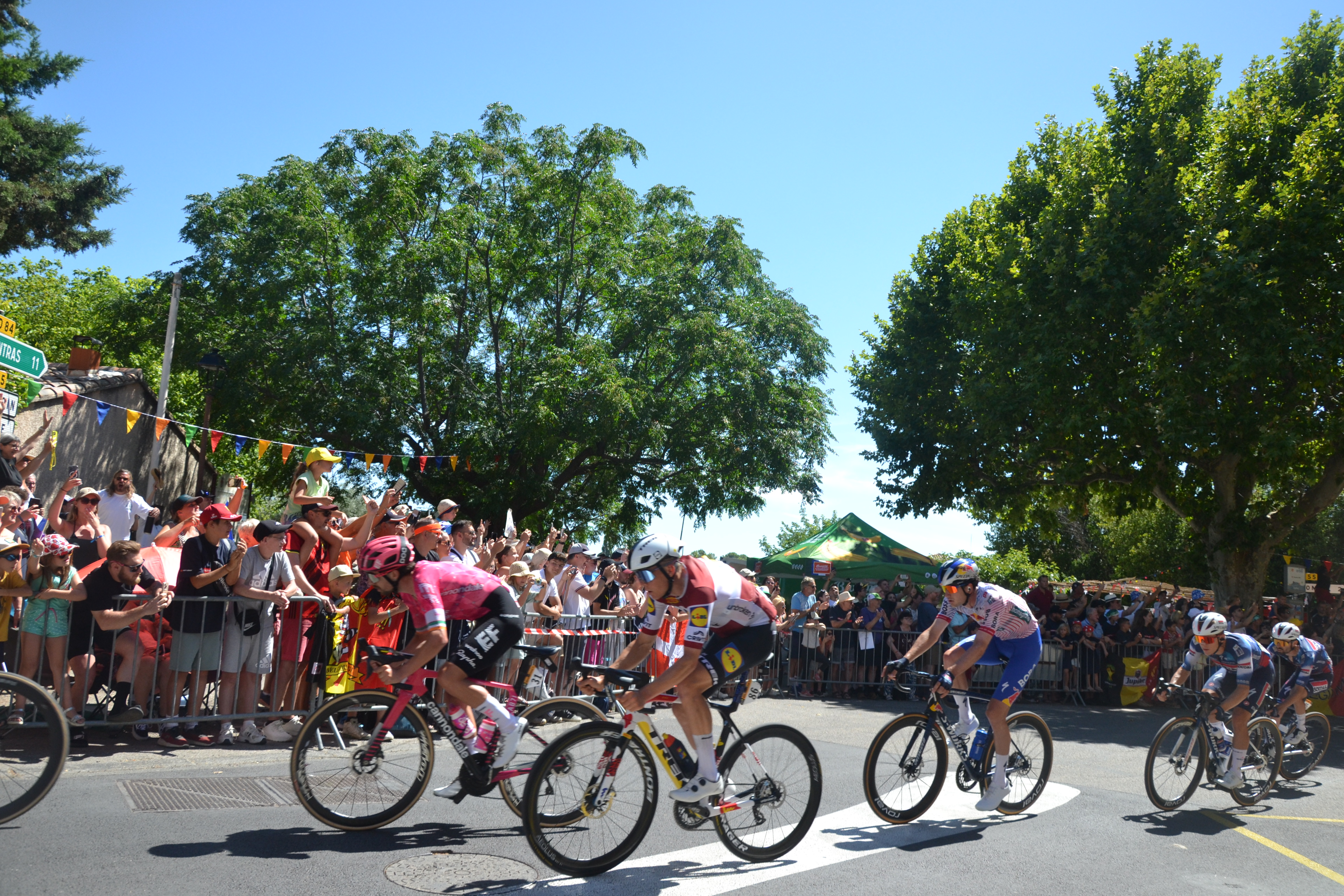
Riders passing through Modène

After the second rest day, the sixteenth stage started in Montpellier, before heading eastwards towards a summit finish at the hors catégorie climb of Mont Ventoux – a 15.7km climb with an average gradient of 8.8%, with the finish at an elevation of 1,910 m (6,270 ft). The Tour last had a summit finish at Mont Ventoux in 2013.

10 kilometres (6.2 mi) from the start in Montpellier, Xandro Meurisse (Alpecin–Deceuninck), Marc Hirschi (Tudor Pro Cycling Team), and Marco Haller (Tudor Pro Cycling Team) were able to get away from the peloton. Several riders tried to go in pursuit of them but after a few kilometres, the trio's lead ballooned to almost two minutes. Eventually, the attacks in the peloton restarted, bringing the front group within touching distance. Soon after, a group of 36 riders escaped from the peloton, included Healy, who sat in tenth overall at the start of the day. The break continued to increase their advantage over the peloton until a group of seven riders composed of Arensman, Alaphilippe, Fred Wright (Team Bahrain Victorious), Enric Mas (Movistar Team), Jonas Abrahamsen (Uno-X Mobility), Matteo Trentin (Tudor Pro Cycling Team), and Simone Velasco (XDS Astana Team) detached themselves off the front with 65 kilometres (40 mi) to go. As the riders approached the foot of Mont Ventoux, the front group had a lead of almost two minutes on the rest of the break while the peloton was six and a half minutes down.

On the climb, the front group splintered with Mas soloing off the front with 14 kilometres (8.7 mi) left. His closest chasers, Arensman and Alaphilippe, gradually dropped back to the rest of the break, which had also splintered at this point. Paret-Peintre, Healy and Santiago Buitrago (Team Bahrain Victorious) emerged as the strongest riders from the chase group, with the trio beginning to close in on Mas. After Buitrago was dropped, Healy and Paret-Peintre managed to bridge up to Mas at 3.6 kilometres (2.2 mi) from the finish. Buitrago soon made his way back to the front as the leaders looked at each other. The riders attacked each other in the final few kilometres but the only rider to get dropped was Mas, leaving a trio of riders up front. Inside the final kilometre, Ilan Van Wilder, Paret-Peintre's teammate, managed to bridge to the lead group. He immediately began the leadout for the sprint, with Healy launching first. Paret-Peintre came around Healy out of the last corner to become the first Frenchman to win a stage in this year's Tour.

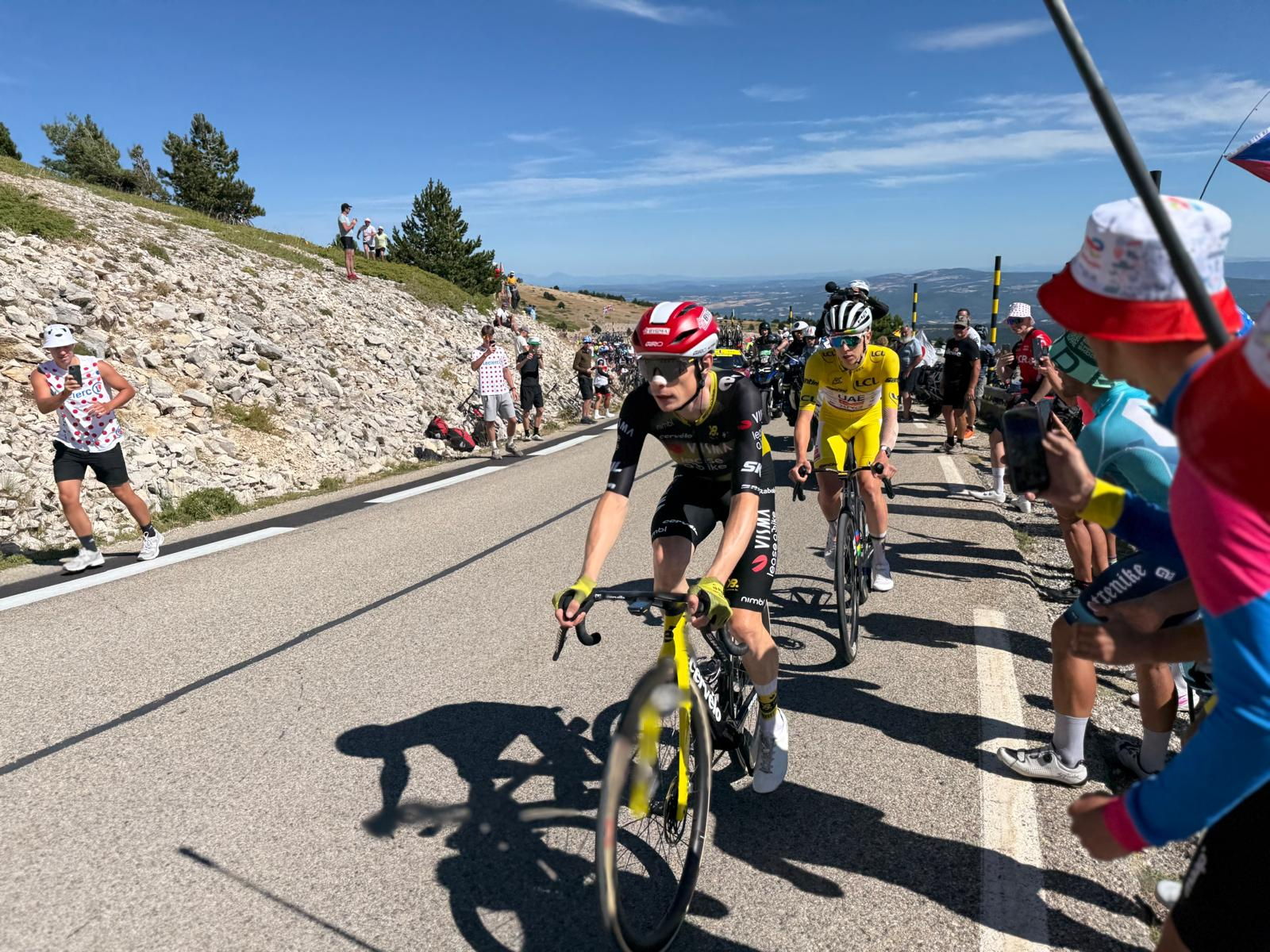
Jonas Vingegaard and Tadej Pogačar ascending Mont Ventoux

In the GC group, Visma–Lease a Bike set a hard pace from the bottom of the climb. Around 9 kilometres (5.6 mi) from the finish, Vingegaard made his first attack with Pogačar going straight to his wheel. At separate times, the duo bridged up to Vingegaard's teammates from the break, Tiesj Benoot and Victor Campenaerts, who both set a hard pace before Vingegaard launched more attacks. However, Pogačar was able to respond each time. Pogačar then attacked inside the final 2 kilometres (1.2 mi) but Vingegaard was able to get back to him. At the finish, Pogačar managed to gap Vingegaard by two seconds, with the duo falling short of catching the lead group by less than 50 seconds. Red Bull–Bora–Hansgrohe teammates, Roglič and Lipowitz finished as the best of the rest of the GC contenders, finishing more than a minute down on Pogačar and Vingegaard. In the GC, Pogačar extended his lead to 4' 15" over Vingegaard while Lipowitz solidified his third place after gaining 36 seconds on Onley, who sat in fourth. Roglič took over fifth after Vauquelin lost almost two minutes to him.

Past the finish line, Vingegaard crashed after a photographer ran in front of him but both were not seriously hurt. A few minutes later, Tobias Halland Johannessen, sitting in eighth overall, needed oxygen and was taken to the hospital after suffering from abdominal pain on the final climb. He eventually felt better afterwards.

Stage 16 Result
Rank	Rider	Team	Time
1	Valentin Paret-Peintre (FRA)	Soudal–Quick-Step	4h 03' 19"
2	Ben Healy (IRL)	EF Education–EasyPost	+ 0"
3	Santiago Buitrago (COL)	Team Bahrain Victorious	+ 4"
4	Ilan Van Wilder (BEL)	Soudal–Quick-Step	+ 14"
5	Tadej Pogačar (SLO)	UAE Team Emirates XRG	+ 43"
6	Jonas Vingegaard (DEN)	Visma–Lease a Bike	+ 45"
7	Enric Mas (ESP)	Movistar Team	+ 53"
8	Julian Alaphilippe (FRA)	Tudor Pro Cycling Team	+ 1' 17"
9	Primož Roglič (SLO)	Red Bull–Bora–Hansgrohe	+ 1' 51"
10	Florian Lipowitz (GER)	Red Bull–Bora–Hansgrohe	+ 1' 53"

General classification after Stage 16
Rank	Rider	Team	Time
1	Tadej Pogačar (SLO)	UAE Team Emirates XRG	58h 24' 46"
2	Jonas Vingegaard (DEN)	Visma–Lease a Bike	+ 4' 15"
3	Florian Lipowitz (GER)	Red Bull–Bora–Hansgrohe	+ 9' 03"
4	Oscar Onley (GBR)	Team Picnic–PostNL	+ 11' 04"
5	Primož Roglič (SLO)	Red Bull–Bora–Hansgrohe	+ 11' 42"
6	Kévin Vauquelin (FRA)	Arkéa–B&B Hotels	+ 13' 20"
7	Felix Gall (AUT)	Decathlon–AG2R La Mondiale	+ 14' 50"
8	Tobias Halland Johannessen (NOR)	Uno-X Mobility	+ 17' 01"
9	Ben Healy (IRL)	EF Education–EasyPost	+ 17' 52"
10	Carlos Rodríguez (ESP)	Ineos Grenadiers	+ 20' 45"

== Stage 17 ==
23 July 2025 – Bollène to Valence, 160.4 km (99.7 mi)

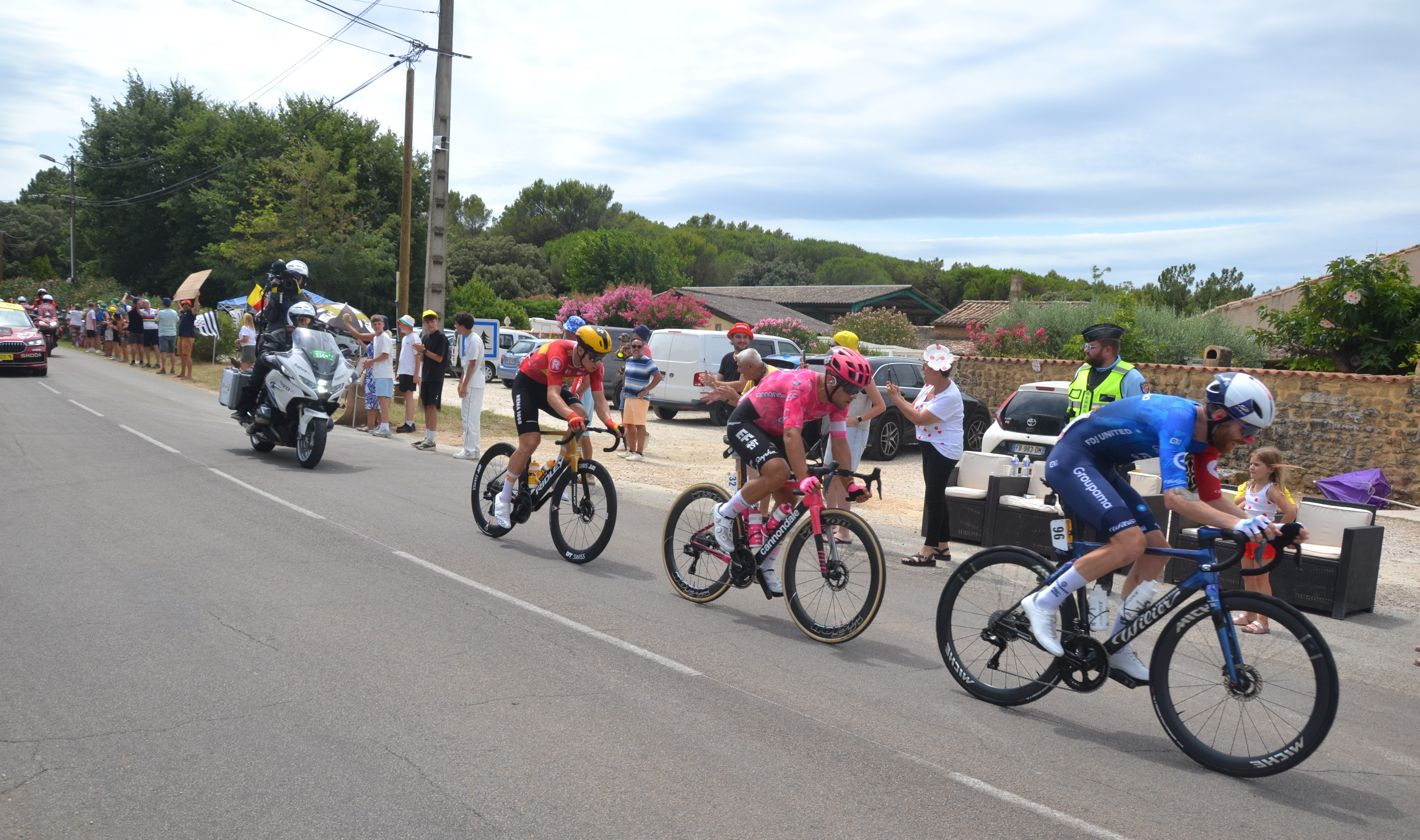
Breakaway at St Turquois

Heading north towards the French Alps, stage seventeen took the riders from Bollène to Valence with two fourth-category climbs on the 160.4 km (99.7 mi) route.

Immediately from the start of the stage, four riders established the day's breakaway. The group was composed of Abrahamsen, Quentin Pacher (Groupama–FDJ), Mathieu Burgaudeau (Team TotalEnergies), and Vincenzo Albanese (EF Education–EasyPost). Axel Laurance (Ineos Grenadiers) tried to bridge afterwards but he never got close and was eventually caught by the peloton. The break's maximum lead was at almost three minutes as Soudal–Quick-Step and Lidl–Trek controlled for their sprinters, Tim Merlier and Jonathan Milan, respectively. When the riders approached the first climb of the day, the Col du Pertuis, multiple riders tried to attack from the peloton. The increase in pace caused Milan to get dropped from the peloton. He was around a minute down at one point but Lidl–Trek were able to successfully bring him back. As the race approached the final climb of the day, the break's lead stood at around a minute.

On the slopes of Col de Tartaiguille, Wout van Aert (Visma–Lease a Bike) attacked from the peloton with 45 kilometres (28 mi) left, attempting to bridge to the break. However, he was stuck in between the break and the peloton and he was eventually swallowed up by the peloton. Heading to the finish, rain began to douse the riders on the road. With 11 kilometres (6.8 mi) to go, Abrahamsen left his breakaway companions. He was eventually caught at 4 kilometres (2.5 mi) from the finish, setting up a bunch sprint. Just before the flamme rouge, a crash brought down several riders including Biniam Girmay (Intermarché–Wanty), causing a small group, including Milan, to contest for the win. Among those caught out was Merlier, one of the stage favorites. In the final sprint, Milan held off Jordi Meeus (Red Bull–Bora–Hansgrohe) to win his second stage of the race. By finishing fifth at the intermediate sprint and getting the maximum of 50 points at the finish, Milan extended his lead to 72 points in the points classification. The top of the GC remained unchanged before the race headed to the Alps.

Stage 17 Result
Rank	Rider	Team	Time
1	Jonathan Milan (ITA)	Lidl–Trek	3h 25' 30"
2	Jordi Meeus (BEL)	Red Bull–Bora–Hansgrohe	+ 0"
3	Tobias Lund Andresen (DEN)	Team Picnic–PostNL	+ 0"
4	Arnaud de Lie (BEL)	Lotto	+ 0"
5	Davide Ballerini (ITA)	XDS Astana Team	+ 0"
6	Alberto Dainese (ITA)	Tudor Pro Cycling Team	+ 0"
7	Paul Penhoët (FRA)	Groupama–FDJ	+ 0"
8	Yevgeniy Fedorov (KAZ)	XDS Astana Team	+ 0"
9	Clément Russo (FRA)	Groupama–FDJ	+ 0"
10	Jasper Stuyven (BEL)	Lidl–Trek	+ 0"

General classification after Stage 17
Rank	Rider	Team	Time
1	Tadej Pogačar (SLO)	UAE Team Emirates XRG	61h 51' 25"
2	Jonas Vingegaard (DEN)	Visma–Lease a Bike	+ 4' 15"
3	Florian Lipowitz (GER)	Red Bull–Bora–Hansgrohe	+ 9' 03"
4	Oscar Onley (GBR)	Team Picnic–PostNL	+ 11' 04"
5	Primož Roglič (SLO)	Red Bull–Bora–Hansgrohe	+ 11' 42"
6	Kévin Vauquelin (FRA)	Arkéa–B&B Hotels	+ 13' 20"
7	Felix Gall (AUT)	Decathlon–AG2R La Mondiale	+ 14' 50"
8	Tobias Halland Johannessen (NOR)	Uno-X Mobility	+ 17' 01"
9	Ben Healy (IRL)	EF Education–EasyPost	+ 17' 52"
10	Carlos Rodríguez (ESP)	Ineos Grenadiers	+ 20' 45"

== Stage 18 ==
24 July 2025 – Vif to Courchevel (Col de la Loze), 171.5 km (106.6 mi)

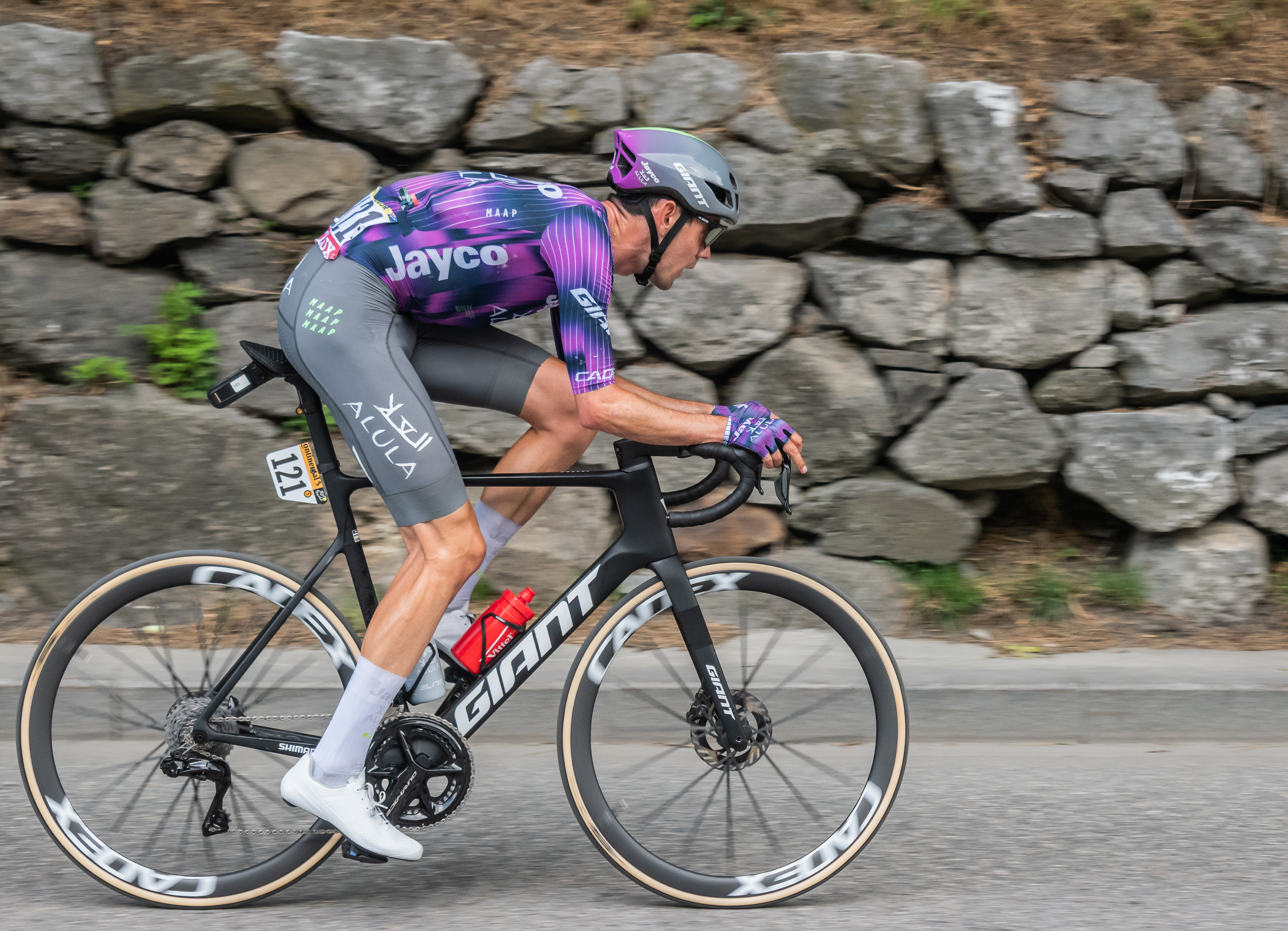
Ben O'Connor passing through Salins-les-Thermes

The eighteenth stage was one of two stages in the Alps, with three hors catégorie climbs on the 171.5-kilometre (106.6 mi) route from Vif to Courchevel – the Col du Glandon (21.7km at 5.1%), the Col de la Madeleine (19.2km at 7.9%) and a summit finish at the Col de la Loze – a 26.4km climb with an average gradient of 6.5%, with the finish at an elevation of 2,304 m (7,559 ft). The stage had 5,450 m (17,880 ft) of elevation gain. Media considered it as one of the queen stages of the race.

Prior to the start of the stage, Ineos Grenadiers announced that Carlos Rodríguez, who was lying in tenth overall at the start of the day, had abandoned the race after fracturing his pelvis in a crash in the closing stages of stage 17. As the flag dropped, Lidl–Trek controlled the first 24 kilometres (15 mi) until the intermediate sprint where Milan further increased his lead in the points classification by crossing the line first. Towards the foot of Col du Glandon, attacks flew from the peloton until a 14-man group was established in the middle of the climb. The group included Roglič, who was fifth overall at almost 12 minutes down at the start of the day, as well as Felix Gall (Decathlon–AG2R La Mondiale), who was lying in seventh overall. There were chase groups that formed behind the main break but they weren't able to bridge to the front. At the top, Martinez took the maximum of 20 points for the mountains classification. However, he was penalized 8 points at the end of the stage after he took several sticky bottles to come back to the front group. The peloton, led by UAE Team Emirates XRG, crossed the top at around two minutes down.

On the descent of the Col du Glandon, Jorgenson and Arensman gapped the rest of the front group, taking a lead of almost a minute at the foot of Col de la Madeleine. On the slopes of the climb, Visma–Lease a Bike began to set a furious pace to prepare the attack of Vingegaard. Kuss managed to whittle down the GC group to just him, Vingegaard, and Pogačar. With 72 kilometres (45 mi) left and still 5 kilometres (3.1 mi) from the top of the Madeleine, Vingegaard attacked with Pogačar immediately on his wheel. The duo joined up with the rest of the lead group, which was composed of Jorgenson, Arensman, Roglič, Gall, Ben O'Connor (Team Jayco–AlUla), and Einer Rubio (Movistar Team). Vingegaard led the group at the top of the climb, leading Lipowitz by half a minute and leading the other GC contenders by almost two minutes.

As the front group reached the valley section before Col de la Loze, the pace stopped, causing O'Connor, Rubio, and Jorgenson to attack off the front with 42 kilometres (26 mi) left. Lipowitz also managed to reach the rest of the group before launching a counterattack himself. The group with Pogačar and Vingegaard quickly fell back to the GC group, which was almost four minutes down on the front group at the foot of the Col de la Loze. On the climb, Jorgenson was quickly dropped from the front while O'Connor proceeded to drop Rubio with 16 kilometres (9.9 mi) to go. Meanwhile, Lipowitz was unable to reach the front and he gradually dropped back to the yellow jersey group. With the GC group merely setting a steady pace for most of the climb, O'Connor stayed away to win his second career Tour stage. Inside the last 2 kilometres (1.2 mi), Vingegaard launched an attack that was only followed by Pogačar and Onley. Pogačar countered inside the final kilometre, dropping Vingegaard and Onley and going past Rubio to take second on the stage, 1' 45" down on O'Connor. Vingegaard took third, losing a total of 11 seconds to Pogačar.

In the GC, Pogačar increased his advantage to almost four and a half minutes over Vingegaard. Lipowitz kept third but his advantage over Onley decreased to 22 seconds after Onley gained more than a minute and a half on Lipowitz. O'Connor's gains on the day allowed him to enter the top 10 in tenth place.

Stage 18 Result
Rank	Rider	Team	Time
1	Ben O'Connor (AUS)	Team Jayco–AlUla	5h 03' 47"
2	Tadej Pogačar (SLO)	UAE Team Emirates XRG	+ 1' 45"
3	Jonas Vingegaard (DEN)	Visma–Lease a Bike	+ 1' 54"
4	Oscar Onley (GBR)	Team Picnic–PostNL	+ 1' 58"
5	Einer Rubio (COL)	Movistar Team	+ 2' 00"
6	Felix Gall (AUT)	Decathlon–AG2R La Mondiale	+ 2' 25"
7	Primož Roglič (SLO)	Red Bull–Bora–Hansgrohe	+ 2' 46"
8	Adam Yates (GBR)	UAE Team Emirates XRG	+ 3' 03"
9	Tobias Halland Johannessen (NOR)	Uno-X Mobility	+ 3' 09"
10	Sepp Kuss (USA)	Visma–Lease a Bike	+ 3' 26"

General classification after Stage 18
Rank	Rider	Team	Time
1	Tadej Pogačar (SLO)	UAE Team Emirates XRG	66h 55' 42"
2	Jonas Vingegaard (DEN)	Visma–Lease a Bike	+ 4' 26"
3	Florian Lipowitz (GER)	Red Bull–Bora–Hansgrohe	+ 11' 01"
4	Oscar Onley (GBR)	Team Picnic–PostNL	+ 11' 23"
5	Primož Roglič (SLO)	Red Bull–Bora–Hansgrohe	+ 12' 49"
6	Felix Gall (AUT)	Decathlon–AG2R La Mondiale	+ 15' 36"
7	Kévin Vauquelin (FRA)	Arkéa–B&B Hotels	+ 16' 15"
8	Tobias Halland Johannessen (NOR)	Uno-X Mobility	+ 18' 31"
9	Ben Healy (IRL)	EF Education–EasyPost	+ 25' 41"
10	Ben O'Connor (AUS)	Team Jayco–AlUla	+ 29' 19"

== Stage 19 ==
25 July 2025 – Albertville to La Plagne, 93.1 km (57.8 mi)

The nineteenth stage was the second in the Alps. The original route was scheduled to be 129.9 kilometres (80.7 mi) from Albertville to La Plagne having five categorized climbs including the first-category Col des Saisies (13.7km at 6.4%), the hors catégorie Col du Pré (12.6km at 7.7%) and a summit finish at La Plagne – a hors catégorie climb 19.1km in length with an average gradient of 7.2%, with the finish at an elevation of 2,052 m (6,732 ft). However, an outbreak of contagious nodular dermatitis among cattle on the Col des Saisies forced organizers to reroute the stage, removing the classified climbs on the Col des Saisies and Le Cote d'Héry sur Ugine and shortening the overall length of the stage to 93.1 kilometres (57.8 mi).

Much like the previous day, Lidl–Trek took control of the peloton until the intermediate sprint after 12 kilometres (7.5 mi) of racing, where Milan once again took maximum points to solidify his lead in the points classification. As the riders reached the Col du Pré, several riders attempted to go up the road until a three-man break composed of Roglič, Martinez, and Valentin Paret-Peintre was left in front. Victor Campenaerts (Visma–Lease a Bike), Bruno Armirail (Decathlon–AG2R La Mondiale), Einer Rubio (Movistar Team), and Tobias Foss (Ineos Grenadiers) formed a chase group but they were not able to bridge to the front group. Martinez took maximum points at the top of the climb while the peloton crossed the top at just under a minute down. On the next climb, the Cormet de Roselend, Vauquelin began to struggle in the GC group, causing Uno-X Mobility to pace the peloton in an attempt to move Tobias Halland Johannessen up the standings. Martinez took the maximum points again at the top of the climb, moving him to within 8 points of Pogačar's lead in the mountains classification. At this point, the peloton was still under a minute behind the break.

On the descent of Cormet de Roselend, the break split up as Roglič soloed off the front. Martinez and Paret-Peintre were swallowed up by the peloton at the bottom of the descent while Roglič was eventually caught just before the riders reached the foot of La Plagne. UAE Team Emirates XRG kept the pacemaking duties on the climb until Decathlon–AG2R La Mondiale took over once Roglič was dropped, with Gall needing to make up almost three minutes on Roglič to move into the top five overall. With 14 kilometres (8.7 mi) left, Arensman attacked, going clear of the GC group. Shortly afterwards, Pogačar launched a move of his own, dropping everyone but Vingegaard and catching Arensman. Arensman accelerated two more times until he got clear of Pogačar and Vingegaard. He built a lead of around half a minute as the top two in the overall dropped back to the GC group. Pogačar made another move with 7 kilometres (4.3 mi) to go, reducing the group to just him, Vingegaard, Lipowitz, and Onley. Inside the last 2 kilometres (1.2 mi), Onley began to struggle, prompting Lipowitz to move to the front of the group to solidify his advantage. They came close to catching Arensman but the Dutchman held on to win his second stage of this year's Tour. Vingegaard finished second at two seconds down with Pogačar just behind him.

In the GC, Pogačar's lead was reduced by two seconds as a result of Vingegaard gaining more bonus seconds. Lipowitz extended his advantage for third as Onley lost 41 seconds to Lipowitz. Gall successfully moved into the top five after gaining more than 11 minutes on Roglič, who fell to eighth overall. Johannessen moved up two spots into sixth as a result of Vauquelin's and Roglič's time losses on the day.

Stage 19 Result
Rank	Rider	Team	Time
1	Thymen Arensman (NED)	Ineos Grenadiers	2h 46' 06"
2	Jonas Vingegaard (DEN)	Visma–Lease a Bike	+ 2"
3	Tadej Pogačar (SLO)	UAE Team Emirates XRG	+ 2"
4	Florian Lipowitz (GER)	Red Bull–Bora–Hansgrohe	+ 6"
5	Oscar Onley (GBR)	Team Picnic–PostNL	+ 47"
6	Felix Gall (AUT)	Decathlon–AG2R La Mondiale	+ 1' 34"
7	Tobias Halland Johannessen (NOR)	Uno-X Mobility	+ 1' 47"
8	Ben Healy (IRL)	EF Education–EasyPost	+ 2' 19"
9	Valentin Paret-Peintre (FRA)	Decathlon–AG2R La Mondiale	+ 3' 47"
10	Simon Yates (GBR)	Visma–Lease a Bike	+ 3' 54"

General classification after Stage 19
Rank	Rider	Team	Time
1	Tadej Pogačar (SLO)	UAE Team Emirates XRG	69h 41' 46"
2	Jonas Vingegaard (DEN)	Visma–Lease a Bike	+ 4' 24"
3	Florian Lipowitz (GER)	Red Bull–Bora–Hansgrohe	+ 11' 09"
4	Oscar Onley (GBR)	Team Picnic–PostNL	+ 12' 12"
5	Felix Gall (AUT)	Decathlon–AG2R La Mondiale	+ 17' 12"
6	Tobias Halland Johannessen (NOR)	Uno-X Mobility	+ 20' 14"
7	Kévin Vauquelin (FRA)	Arkéa–B&B Hotels	+ 22' 35"
8	Primož Roglič (SLO)	Red Bull–Bora–Hansgrohe	+ 25' 30"
9	Ben Healy (IRL)	EF Education–EasyPost	+ 28' 02"
10	Ben O'Connor (AUS)	Team Jayco–AlUla	+ 34' 34"

== Stage 20 ==
26 July 2025 – Nantua to Pontarlier, 184.2 km (114.5 mi)

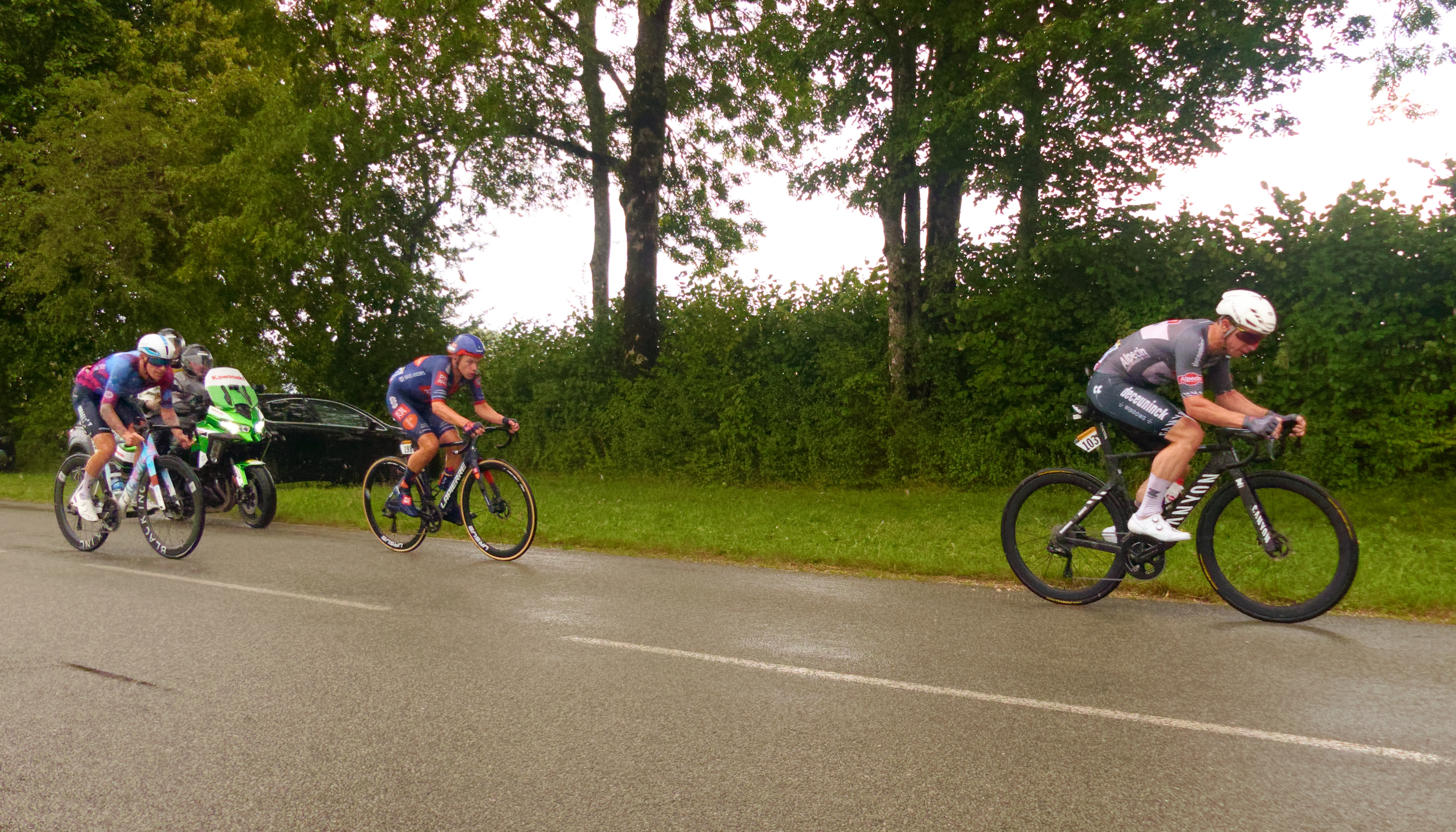
Breakaway, including eventual stage winner Kaden Groves

Leaving the Alps, the race headed north with a hilly 184.2-kilometre (114.5 mi) stage from Nantua to Pontarlier with four categorized climbs (one second-category, one third-category, two fourth-category) on the route.

A long fight to join the break marked the start of the stage. At one point, the peloton split into two with Onley and Gall among those caught behind. The peloton would eventually be stitched back together before a group containing Wellens, Jorgenson, and Ewen Costiou (Arkéa–B&B Hotels) went clear with 136 kilometres (85 mi) left. A few kilometres later, they were soon joined by 10 other riders to make it 13 riders out front. Jordan Jegat (Team TotalEnergies), who was 11th overall at the start of the day, was able to infiltrate the break, forcing Team Jayco–AlUla to keep the break in check as O'Connor, who was tenth overall, led Jegat by four minutes. However, the break's advantage kept rising, threatening O'Connor's tenth place overall. On the Côte de Thésy with 65 kilometres (40 mi) to go, Jegat attacked from the break before being joined soon after by Harry Sweeny (EF Education–EasyPost). Meanwhile, in the peloton, there were a flurry of attacks that caused the formation of a large chase group. However, they only came to within two minutes of the break before gradually losing time. At 54 kilometres (34 mi) from the finish, Sweeny left Jegat behind, soloing off the front. Jegat fell back to the chasers while Sweeny's lead maxed out at around a minute.

With 36 kilometres (22 mi) left, attacks started in the chase group. A group containing Romain Grégoire (Groupama–FDJ), Jake Stewart (Israel–Premier Tech), Simone Velasco (XDS Astana Team), Frank van den Broek (Team Picnic–PostNL), Kaden Groves (Alpecin–Deceuninck), and Iván Romeo (Movistar Team) was formed on the final categorized climb, successfully catching and dropping Sweeny and leaving the six riders to fight it out at the front. With 21 kilometres (13 mi) to go, Romeo and Grégoire crashed on a wet descent while Velasco was caught out, leaving Groves, Stewart, and van den Broek in front. Shortly afterwards, Groves was able to get a gap as both Stewart and van den Broek looked at each other and let Groves' wheel go. Groves' advantage gradually grew towards the finish as he soloed to the stage win. The victory meant that he completed the trilogy of winning a stage at all three Grand Tours. Meanwhile, the rest of the break, including Jegat, finished around a minute down. The peloton crossed the line at seven minutes down, which meant that Jegat overtook O'Connor for the tenth place on GC. In addition, Pogačar and Milan mathematically secured the mountains and points classification, respectively, provided that they finish the following stage.

Stage 20 Result
Rank	Rider	Team	Time
1	Kaden Groves (AUS)	Alpecin–Deceuninck	4h 06' 09"
2	Frank van den Broek (NED)	Team Picnic–PostNL	+ 54"
3	Pascal Eenkhoorn (NED)	Soudal–Quick-Step	+ 59"
4	Simone Velasco (ITA)	XDS Astana Team	+ 1' 04"
5	Romain Grégoire (FRA)	Groupama–FDJ	+ 1' 04"
6	Jake Stewart (GBR)	Israel–Premier Tech	+ 1' 04"
7	Jordan Jegat (FRA)	Team TotalEnergies	+ 1' 04"
8	Tim Wellens (BEL)	UAE Team Emirates XRG	+ 1' 04"
9	Matteo Jorgenson (USA)	Visma–Lease a Bike	+ 1' 04"
10	Harry Sweeny (AUS)	EF Education–EasyPost	+ 1' 04"

General classification after Stage 20
Rank	Rider	Team	Time
1	Tadej Pogačar (SLO)	UAE Team Emirates XRG	73h 54' 59"
2	Jonas Vingegaard (DEN)	Visma–Lease a Bike	+ 4' 24"
3	Florian Lipowitz (GER)	Red Bull–Bora–Hansgrohe	+ 11' 09"
4	Oscar Onley (GBR)	Team Picnic–PostNL	+ 12' 12"
5	Felix Gall (AUT)	Decathlon–AG2R La Mondiale	+ 17' 12"
6	Tobias Halland Johannessen (NOR)	Uno-X Mobility	+ 20' 14"
7	Kévin Vauquelin (FRA)	Arkéa–B&B Hotels	+ 22' 35"
8	Primož Roglič (SLO)	Red Bull–Bora–Hansgrohe	+ 25' 30"
9	Ben Healy (IRL)	EF Education–EasyPost	+ 28' 02"
10	Jordan Jegat (FRA)	Team TotalEnergies	+ 32' 42"

== Stage 21 ==
27 July 2025 – Mantes-la-Ville to Paris (Champs-Élysées), 132.3 km (82.2 mi)

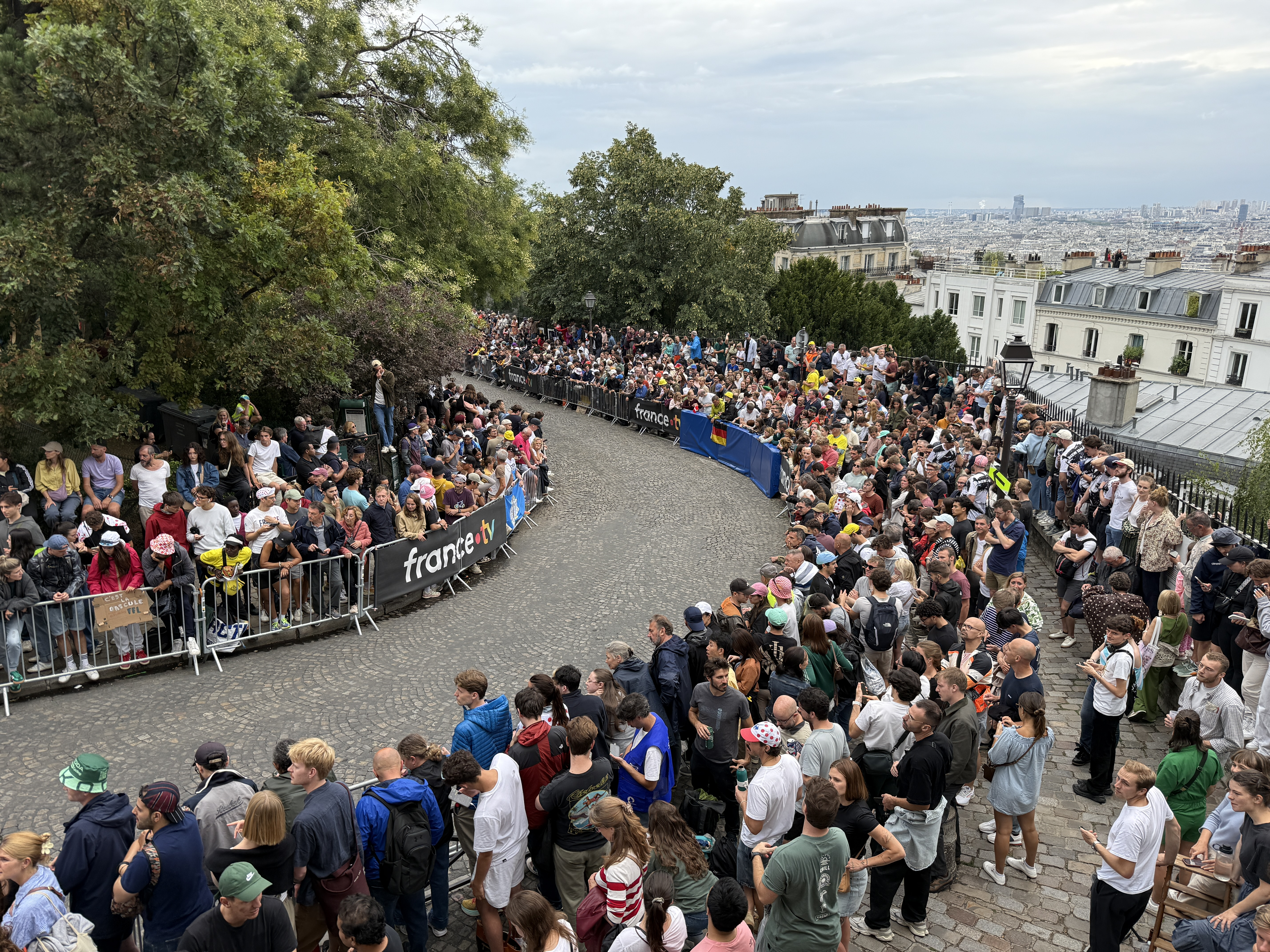
Large crowds attended the final stage of the race in Montmartre in Paris

The final stage of the Tour returned to Paris with the traditional final stage to Champs-Élysées. However, unlike previous editions of the Tour, the stage included climbs of Montmartre before the finish on the Champs-Élysées, inspired by the road races at the Paris 2024 Summer Olympics. The stage had five fourth-category climbs, with three ascents of the Côte de la Butte Montmartre climb (1.1km at 5.9%). Sprinters noted that they did not expect the stage to finish with a bunch sprint.

Much like previous stages finishing at the Champs-Élysées, the start of the stage was a ceremonial procession before the riders reached the circuit on the Champs-Élysées. Before the race reached Champs-Élysées, the organizers announced that the GC was going to be neutralized before reaching the Montmartre circuit as rain began to fall. UAE Team Emirates XRG led the peloton across the first passage of the finish line before the attacks began. The first break to get a significant gap came from Quinn Simmons (Lidl–Trek) and Lipowitz but they never got more than 20 seconds on the peloton before being brought back with 44 kilometres (27 mi) left. On the first ascent of Côte de la Butte Montmartre, Julian Alaphilippe (Tudor Pro Cycling Team) attacked from the bottom, pulling a group of 28 clear at the top, including Pogačar. They gradually increased their advantage on the first chase group, which included Milan, before looping back towards the climb of Montmartre for the second time.

On the second time up Montmartre, Pogačar lifted the pace, only being followed by van Aert, Jorgenson, Davide Ballerini (XDS Astana Team), Matteo Trentin (Tudor Pro Cycling Team), and Matej Mohorič (Team Bahrain Victorious). The group of six continued to increase their advantage over the chase group, preventing them from coming back. On the approach to the final ascent of the Montmartre, Jorgenson accelerated but he was closed down. Pogačar immediately attacked from the bottom of the climb, with only van Aert being able to stick to his wheel. Towards the top, van Aert was able to launch a counterattack, distancing Pogačar, who soon dropped back to the chase group. Van Aert soloed to the finish to win by 19 seconds ahead of the chasers. Pogačar finished fourth to confirm his fourth Tour victory as well as the mountains classification. Milan and Lipowitz also finished safely to confirm their wins in the points and young rider classifications, respectively. The traditional prize-giving commenced shortly afterwards.

Stage 21 Result
Rank	Rider	Team	Time
1	Wout van Aert (BEL)	Visma–Lease a Bike	3h 07' 30"
2	Davide Ballerini (ITA)	XDS Astana Team	+ 0"
3	Matej Mohorič (SLO)	Team Bahrain Victorious	+ 0"
4	Tadej Pogačar (SLO)	UAE Team Emirates XRG	+ 0"
5	Matteo Jorgenson (USA)	Visma–Lease a Bike	+ 0"
6	Matteo Trentin (ITA)	Tudor Pro Cycling Team	+ 0"
7	Arnaud De Lie (BEL)	Lotto	+ 0"
8	Kévin Vauquelin (FRA)	Arkéa–B&B Hotels	+ 0"
9	Mike Teunissen (NED)	XDS Astana Team	+ 0"
10	Dylan Teuns (BEL)	Cofidis	+ 0"

Final General classification
Rank	Rider	Team	Time
1	Tadej Pogačar (SLO)	UAE Team Emirates XRG	76h 00' 32"
2	Jonas Vingegaard (DEN)	Visma–Lease a Bike	+ 4' 24"
3	Florian Lipowitz (GER)	Red Bull–Bora–Hansgrohe	+ 11' 00"
4	Oscar Onley (GBR)	Team Picnic–PostNL	+ 12' 12"
5	Felix Gall (AUT)	Decathlon–AG2R La Mondiale	+ 17' 12"
6	Tobias Halland Johannessen (NOR)	Uno-X Mobility	+ 20' 14"
7	Kévin Vauquelin (FRA)	Arkéa–B&B Hotels	+ 22' 35"
8	Primož Roglič (SLO)	Red Bull–Bora–Hansgrohe	+ 25' 30"
9	Ben Healy (IRL)	EF Education–EasyPost	+ 28' 02"
10	Jordan Jegat (FRA)	Team TotalEnergies	+ 32' 42"
