= Col de Méraillet =

Mountain pass in the French Alps

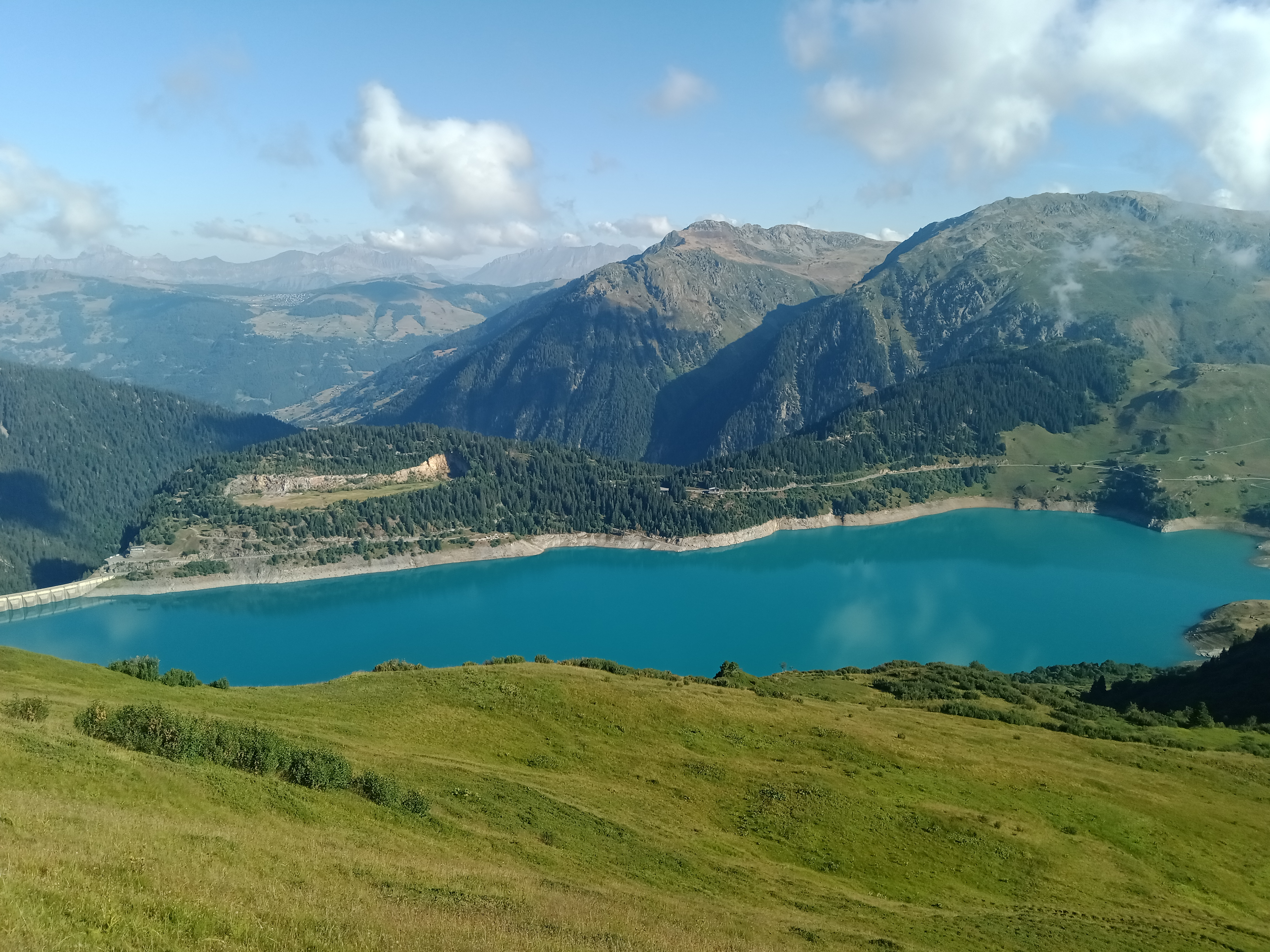

- Location within Alps
- Elevation: 1,605 metres (5,266 ft)
- Traversed by: D 925

Third Approach
- Location: Savoie, France
- Range: Alps
- Coordinates: 45°41′42″N 6°38′5″E

Col de Méraillet (el. 1605 m) is a high mountain pass in the Alps in the department of Savoie in France; it belongs to the commune of Beaufort.

It is traversed by the D 925 road, which also crosses the Cormet de Roselend.

== See also ==
- List of highest paved roads in Europe
- List of mountain passes
