= Roselend Dam =

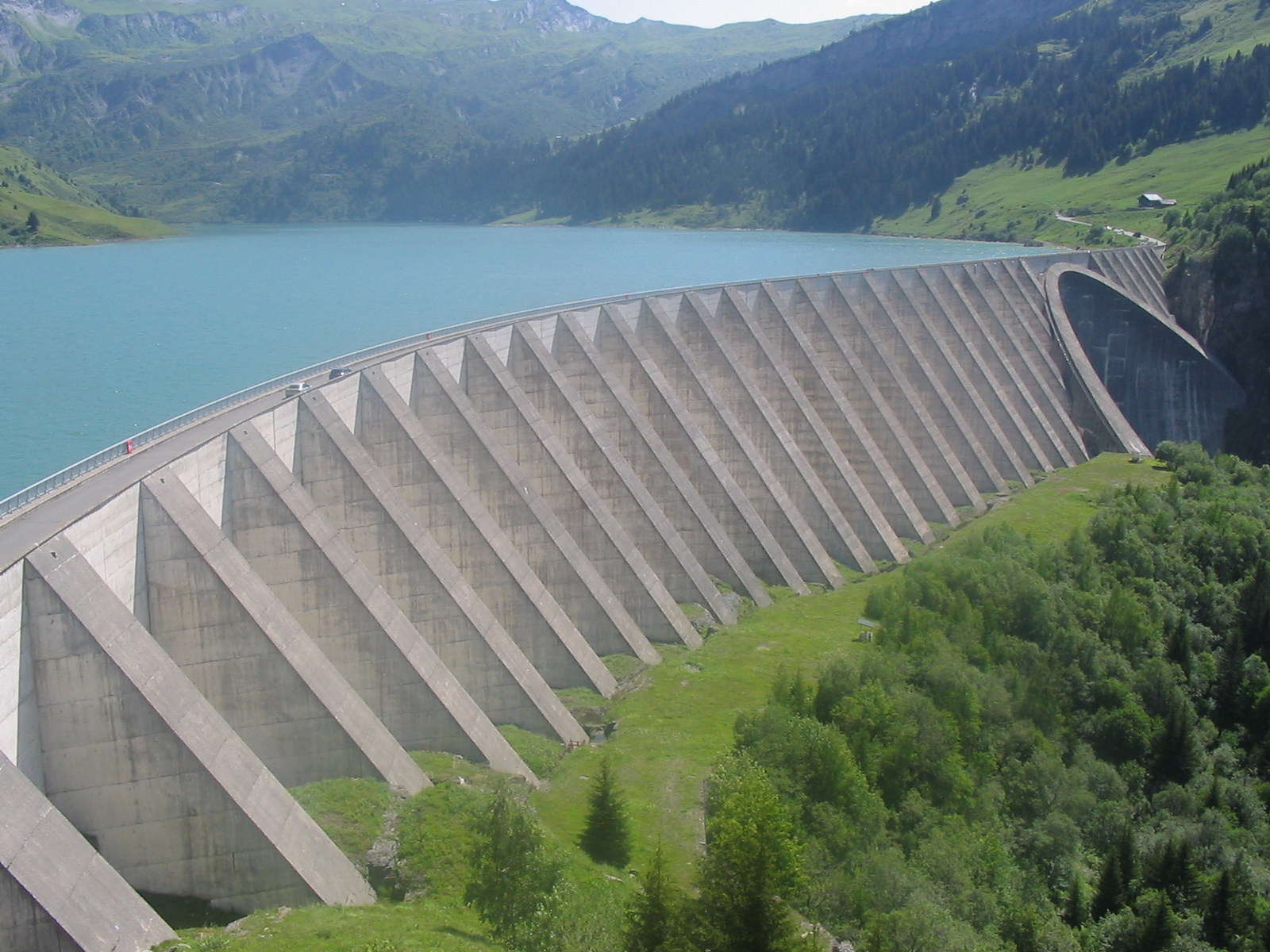

- Location within France
- Official name: Barrage de Roselend
- Country: France
- Location: Beaufort
- Coordinates: 45°41′03″N 6°37′18″E
- Status: Operational
- Construction began: 1955
- Opening date: 1962

Dam and spillways
- Type of dam: Arch-buttress dam
- Height: 150 m (492 ft)
- Length: 804 m (2,638 ft)
- Width (crest): 3 m (10 ft)
- Width (base): 22 m (72 ft)
- Dam volume: 945,000 m^{3} (1,236,013 cu yd)

Reservoir
- Creates: Lac de Roselend
- Total capacity: 187,000,000 m^{3} (151,603 acre⋅ft)
- Catchment area: 44 km^{2} (17 mi^{2})
- Surface area: 3.2 km^{2} (1 mi^{2})
- Normal elevation: 1,557 m (5,108 ft)

La Bâthie Power Station
- Coordinates: 45°38′41″N 6°26′40″E
- Commission date: 1962
- Type: Conventional, diversion
- Hydraulic head: 1,250 m (4,101 ft)
- Turbines: 6 x 91 MW Pelton-type
- Installed capacity: 546 MW

The Roselend Dam is an arch-buttress dam located 5 km (3 mi) east of Beaufort in the Savoie department of the Rhône-Alpes region in south-eastern France. It is located just west and below the Cormet de Roselend mountain pass. The dam was designed by Coyne et Bellier and construction began in 1955. The reservoir began to fill in 1960, the power station was operational in 1961 and the dam complete in 1962. It was constructed for the primary purpose of hydroelectric power generation and supports the 546 MW La Bâthie Power Station.

== Design and operation ==
The dam has a maximum height of 150 m (492 ft) and a length of 804 m (2,638 ft). It is 3 m (10 ft) wide at its crest and 22 m (72 ft) wide at its base. The dam has a structural volume of 945,000 m^{3} (1,236,013 cu yd). Its reservoir, Lac de Roselend, can store 187,000,000 m^{3} (151,603 acre⋅ft) of water and has a surface area of 3.2 km^{2} (1 mi^{2}). Directly over the river bed is the dam's concrete arch with a 215 m (705 ft) radius. Flanking it on either side are concrete buttresses supporting the dam wall. Water from the dam is transferred west via a 13 km (8 mi) long penstock to the underground power station in La Bâthie. At the power station, the water feeds six 91 MW Pelton turbine-generators. The difference in elevation between the power station and reservoir affords a hydraulic head (drop) of 1,250 m (4,101 ft). Water from the St. Guerin Dam, 5 km (3 mi) to the southwest at 45°39′00″N 6°34′46″E and Gittaz Dam, 4.5 km (3 mi) to the northeast at 45°42′40″N 6°38′46″E, provide additional water to Lac de Roselend as well.

== See also ==
- Renewable energy in France
