= Beaufort, Savoie =

Beaufort Bôfôrt (Arpitan)
- Commune
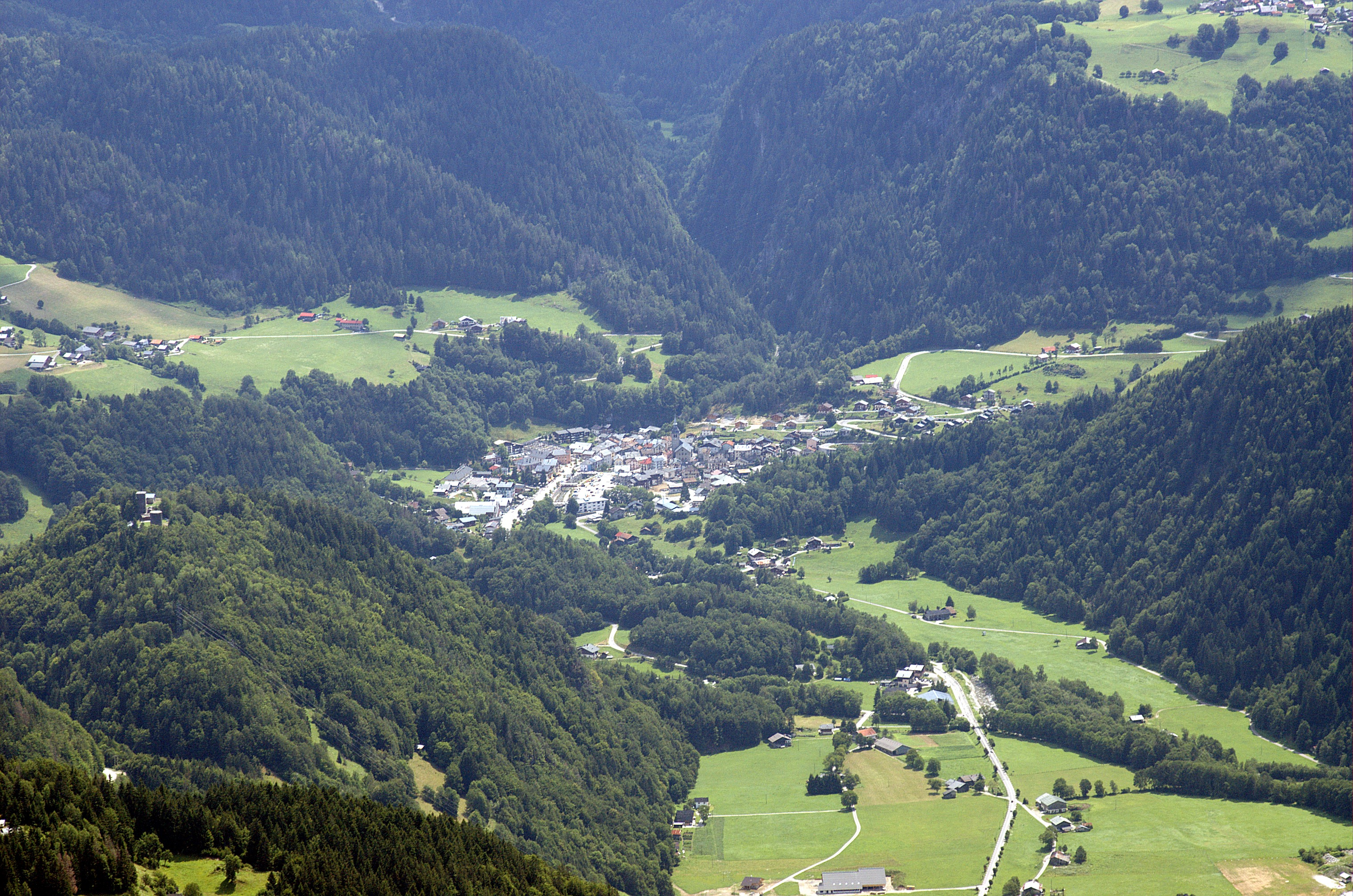
- An aerial view of Beaufort

- Coat of arms
- Location of Beaufort
- Location within France Location within Auvergne-Rhône-Alpes
- Coordinates: 45°43′08″N 6°34′32″E
- Country: France
- Region: Auvergne-Rhône-Alpes
- Department: Savoie
- Arrondissement: Albertville
- Canton: Ugine
- Intercommunality: CA Arlysère

Government
  - Mayor (2020–2026): Christian Frison-Roche
- Area^{1}: 149.53 km^{2} (57.73 sq mi)
- Highest elevation: 2,882 m (9,455 ft)
- Lowest elevation: 683 m (2,241 ft)
- Population (2023): 1,989
  - Density: 13.30/km^{2} (34.45/sq mi)
- Time zone: UTC+01:00 (CET)
  - Summer (DST): UTC+02:00 (CEST)
- INSEE/Postal code: 73034 /73270
- ^{1} French Land Register data, which excludes lakes, ponds, glaciers > 1 km^{2} (0.386 sq mi or 247 acres) and river estuaries.

Beaufort (French: [bofɔʁ]; Savoyard: Bôfôrt), also Beaufort-sur-Doron, is a commune in the Savoie department in the Auvergne-Rhône-Alpes region in south-eastern France. It is the namesake for the Beaufort cheese, which is produced in the surrounding area.

== Geography ==
=== Climate ===
Beaufort has an oceanic climate (Köppen climate classification Cfb). The average annual temperature in Beaufort is 8.8 °C (47.8 °F). The average annual rainfall is 1,384.2 mm (54.50 in) with December as the wettest month. The temperatures are highest on average in July, at around 17.7 °C (63.9 °F), and lowest in January, at around 0.5 °C (32.9 °F). The highest temperature ever recorded in Beaufort was 34.7 °C (94.5 °F) on 27 July 1983; the coldest temperature ever recorded was −24.0 °C (−11.2 °F) on 4 February 1956.

Climate data for Beaufort-sur-Doron (1991−2020 normals, extremes 1950−present)
Month	Jan	Feb	Mar	Apr	May	Jun	Jul	Aug	Sep	Oct	Nov	Dec	Year
Record high °C (°F)	15.4 (59.7)	17.2 (63.0)	21.2 (70.2)	24.0 (75.2)	29.2 (84.6)	33.2 (91.8)	34.7 (94.5)	34.4 (93.9)	29.2 (84.6)	25.5 (77.9)	22.1 (71.8)	18.9 (66.0)	34.7 (94.5)
Mean daily maximum °C (°F)	4.1 (39.4)	5.2 (41.4)	9.2 (48.6)	13.0 (55.4)	16.9 (62.4)	20.8 (69.4)	23.0 (73.4)	22.6 (72.7)	18.0 (64.4)	13.8 (56.8)	8.2 (46.8)	4.4 (39.9)	13.3 (55.9)
Daily mean °C (°F)	0.5 (32.9)	1.0 (33.8)	4.6 (40.3)	8.1 (46.6)	11.9 (53.4)	15.7 (60.3)	17.7 (63.9)	17.5 (63.5)	13.5 (56.3)	9.7 (49.5)	4.6 (40.3)	1.2 (34.2)	8.8 (47.8)
Mean daily minimum °C (°F)	−3.1 (26.4)	−3.2 (26.2)	0.0 (32.0)	3.1 (37.6)	6.9 (44.4)	10.5 (50.9)	12.4 (54.3)	12.5 (54.5)	9.0 (48.2)	5.6 (42.1)	1.0 (33.8)	−2.1 (28.2)	4.4 (39.9)
Record low °C (°F)	−22.1 (−7.8)	−24 (−11)	−19.6 (−3.3)	−10.8 (12.6)	−5.0 (23.0)	−0.8 (30.6)	1.7 (35.1)	2.7 (36.9)	−2.0 (28.4)	−7.1 (19.2)	−12.5 (9.5)	−19.8 (−3.6)	−24.0 (−11.2)
Average precipitation mm (inches)	126.2 (4.97)	101.9 (4.01)	105.7 (4.16)	91.5 (3.60)	123.0 (4.84)	120.1 (4.73)	122.1 (4.81)	117.2 (4.61)	105.7 (4.16)	107.4 (4.23)	114.5 (4.51)	148.9 (5.86)	1,384.2 (54.50)
Average precipitation days (≥ 1.0 mm)	10.4	9.3	9.8	9.7	13.2	11.9	10.7	10.1	9.5	10.1	10.3	11.3	126.2
Source: Météo-France

== Population ==
Historical population
Year	Pop.	±% p.a.
1968	2,072	—
1975	1,913	−1.13%
1982	1,966	+0.39%
1990	1,996	+0.19%
1999	1,985	−0.06%
2007	2,218	+1.40%
2012	2,162	−0.51%
2017	2,040	−1.15%
2023	1,989	−0.42%
Source: INSEE

== See also ==
- Communes of the Savoie department
